= Karl Grünberg =

Karl Grünberg may refer to:

- Karl Grünberg (entomologist), German entomologist
- Karl Grünberg (otologist), German otorhinolaryngologist
- Karl Grünberg (writer), German communist writer and journalist

== See also ==
- Carl Grünberg, Austrian Marxist economist, economic historian and sociologist
