= Ocean Museum Germany =

- Deutsches Meeresmuseum
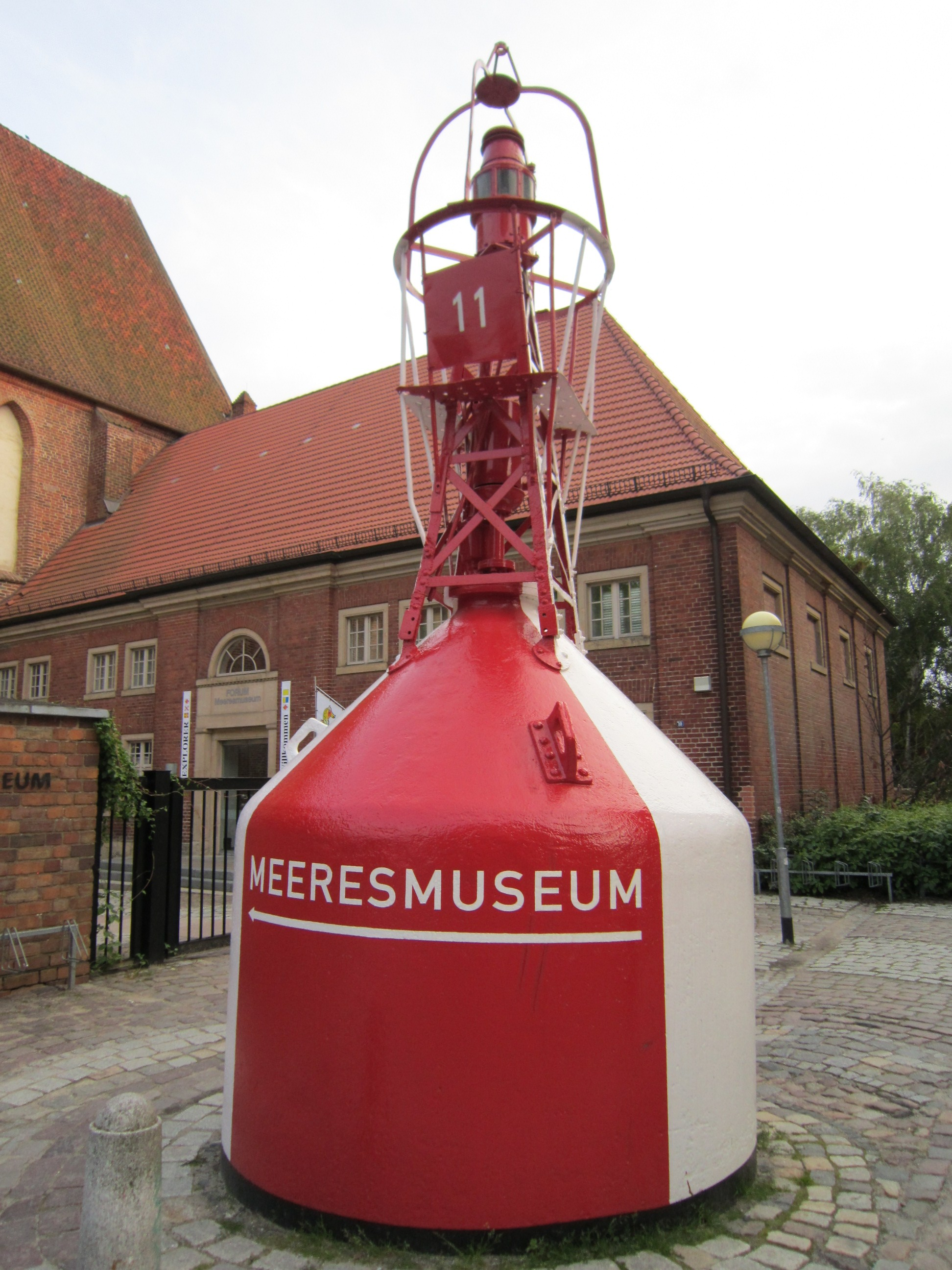
- Advertising in front of the entrance to the Oceanographic Museum
- Former name: Natural History Museum (1951-1994); German Oceanographic Museum (1994-2024)
- Established: 1951
- Location: Stralsund, Germany
- Coordinates: 54°18′45.36″N 13°05′13.49″E
- Type: Maritime museum
- Key holdings: "Adolf Reichwein"
- Collections: "Man and the Sea"
- Founder: Prof. Otto Dibbelt
- Executive director: Dr. Harald Benke
- Website: www.deutsches-meeresmuseum.de/en

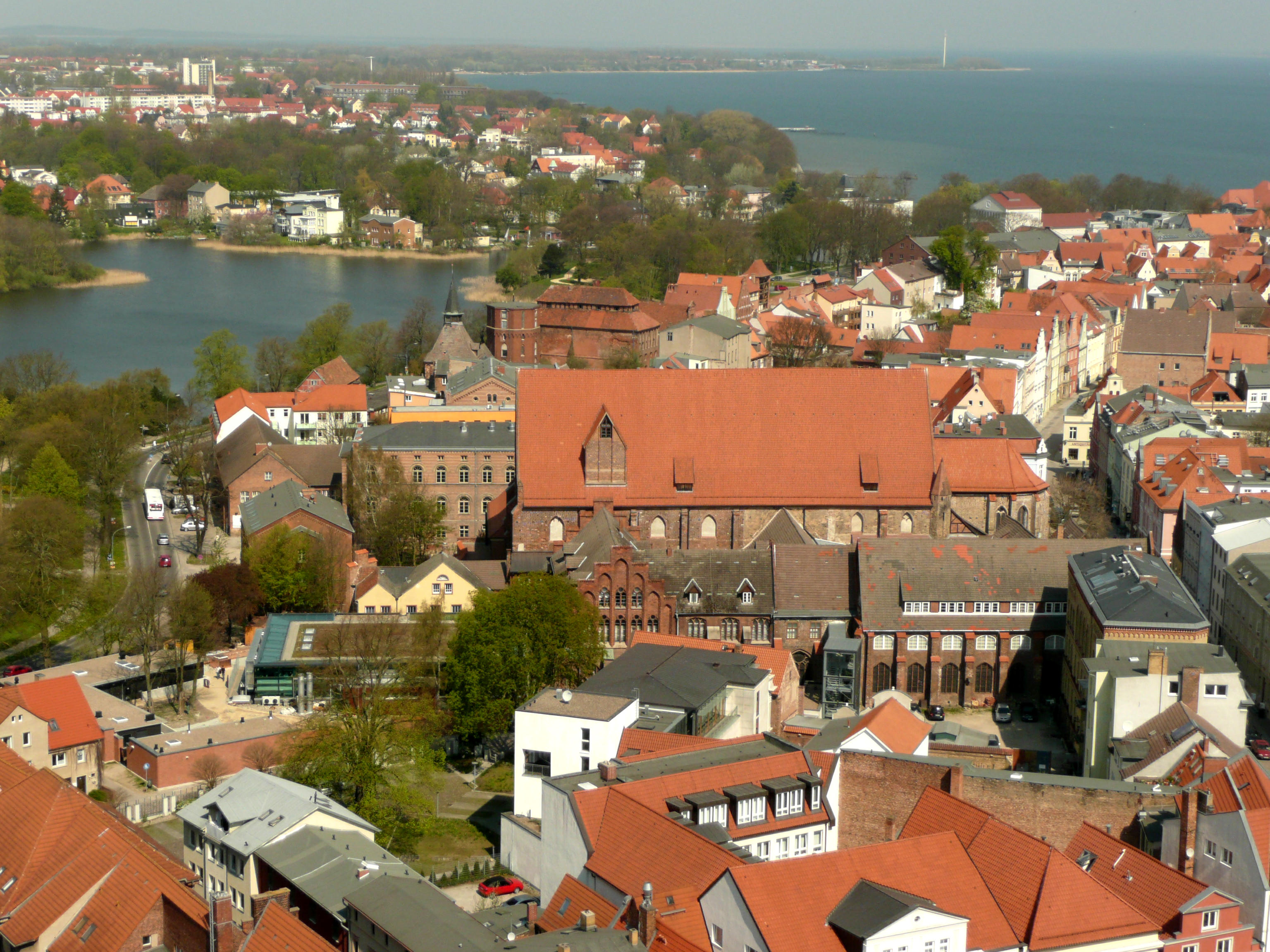
View from the tower of St. Mary's Church of the hall of the old St. Catherine's Church, today home to the Oceanographic Museum

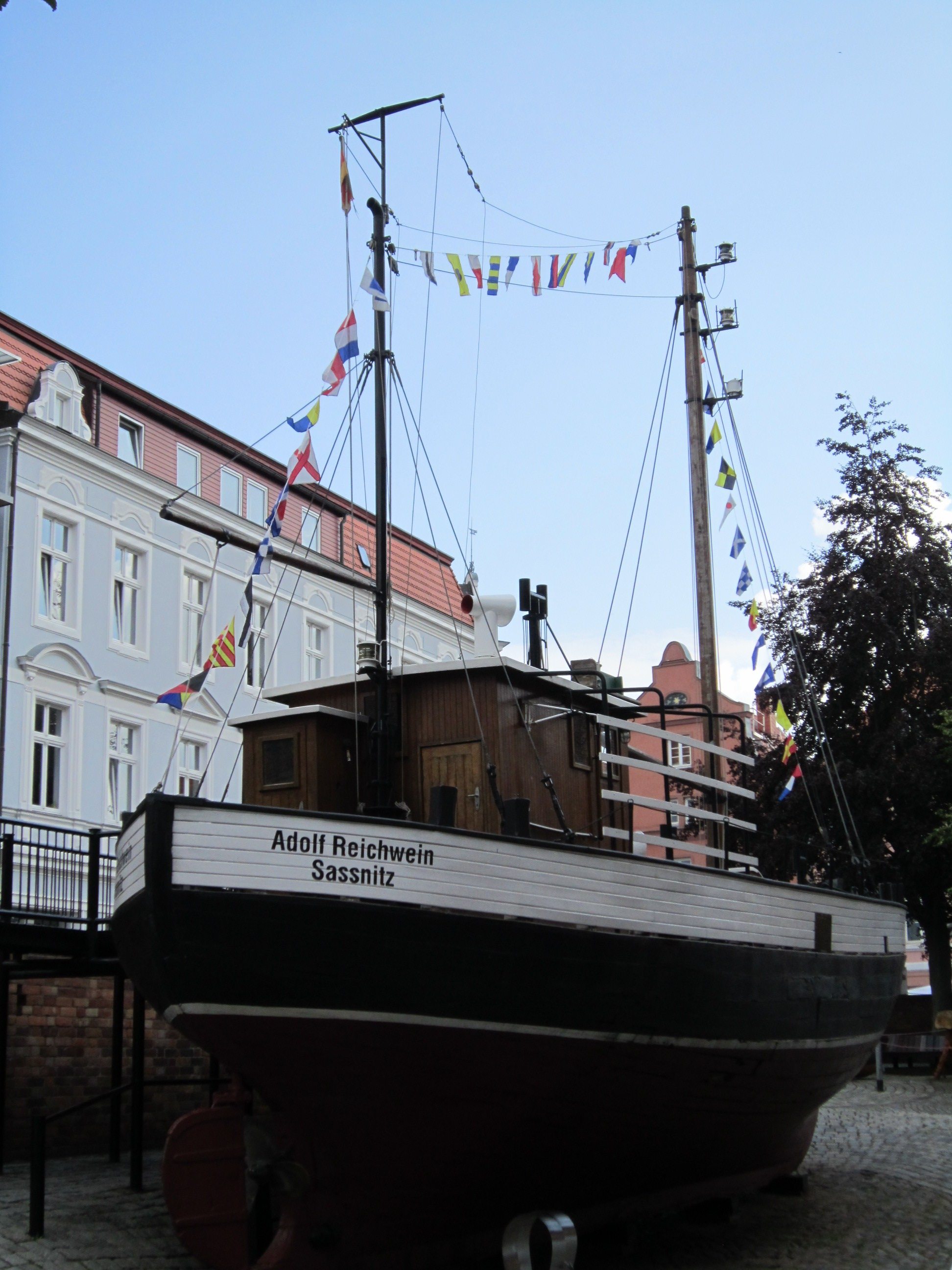
The ship Adolf Reichwein in front of the entrance to the Oceanographic Museum

The Ocean Museum Germany (German: Deutsches Meeresmuseum), also called the Museum for Oceanography and Fisheries, Aquarium (German: Museum für Meereskunde und Fischerei, Aquarium), in the Hanseatic town of Stralsund, is a museum in which maritime and oceanographic exhibitions are displayed. It is the most visited museum in North Germany. In addition to the main museum building, the actual Oceanographic Museum, there are three other sites, the Ozeaneum, opened in July 2008, the Nautineum and the Natureum.

The main house is located in the hall of the former St. Catherine's Church. The Oceanographic Museum has many exhibitions with information on fishing, the environment and marine conservation, on marine and ocean research, flora and fauna of the Baltic Sea region, and, just under 50 aquaria contain more than 600 living sea creatures, including giant tortoises and Polynesian fish.

In the Ozeaneum, which opened on 11 July 2008 on Stralsund's harbour island, there are 39 large aquaria with 7,000 animals from the Baltic Sea, North Sea and Atlantic Ocean, as well as the world's largest exhibition of whales.

The Nautineum on the island of Dänholm has exhibitions on the topics of fishing, marine research, whale research, hydrography and sea routes.

The focal point of the Natureum on the Darß peninsula is nature and the landscape of the peninsula.

== History ==
The museum was founded in 1951 as the Natural History Museum, by Prof. Otto Dibbelt. Starting in 1956 under the leadership of Dr. Sonnfried Streicher, it was continuously development. It current director is Dr. Harald Benke.

After an extension of the exhibition theme to oceanography, in 1966 the museum was renamed the Oceanographic Museum and, in 1974, it was renamed the Museum of Oceanography and Fisheries of the GDR.

Between 1989 and 1990, the construction of the museum café and museum shop was undertaken and the expansion of the aquarium wing started in 1988 completed. The permanent exhibition, "Man and the Sea", was continued and public relations enhanced. The museum participated in the construction of the Western Pomerania Lagoon Area National Park with an exhibition centre in the lighthouse complex of Darßer Ort, later Natureum Darßer Ort. The whale exhibition was redesigned. On the island of Oie the DMM station has been expanded. A quarantine facility for tropical marine life and a filter system for the cold water area were completed as well as a 6,000-litre aquarium with live coral and other marine invertebrates. In 1991, the museum café and shop were opened and the expansion of the collections reaches more than 800 objects. The extension wing was completed in 1992. In the same year an aquarium for tropical marine fish was handed over. The museum building was opened in honour of Hermann Burmeister.

In 1994, the hitherto town-owned museum was turned into a foundation under civil law. In 1996, the vessel "Adolf Reichwein" was restored in the museum courtyard. Also restored were the Baltic Sea walking tour the museum shop. The North Sea Aquarium was closed to begin the renovation of that department.

== Literature ==
- Deutsches Meeresmuseum Stralsund – Museumsführer. published by the Deutsches Meeresmuseum Stralsund, 2004.
- Meeresaquarium Stralsund. published by the Deutsches Meeresmuseum Stralsund.
- Karl-Heinz Tschiesche: Seepferdchen, Kugelfisch und Krake. 2005, ISBN 3-356-01096-4.
