= Paul Manasse =

German physician

Paul Manasse (14 March 1866 in Naugard – 27 September 1927 in Würzburg) was a German physician, who specialized in the field of otology.

He studied medicine at the universities of Tübingen, Berlin and Strasbourg, and after graduation, served as an assistant at the otology clinic in Strasbourg. Following a study trip to Vienna and Berlin, he obtained his habilitation for otology at the University of Strasbourg. In 1901 he was named director of the otology clinic, and during the following year, became an associate professor at the university. In 1911 he attained a full professorship, and in 1919 relocated to the University of Würzburg, where he founded a clinic at the Luitpold-Krankenhaus.

== Selected works ==
- Die Heilung der Lungentuberkulose durch diätetisch-hygieinische Behandlung in Anstalten und Kurorten, 1891 – The cure of pulmonary tuberculosis by dietary-hygienic treatment in hospitals and spas.
- Über chronische, progressive, labyrinthäre Taubheit, 1906 – On chronic, progressive, labyrinthine deafness.
- Die Ostitis chronica metaplastica der menschlichen Labyrinthkapsel : (Otosklerose, Stapesankylose, Spongiosierung der Labyrinthkapesel), 1912 – Chronic otitis metaplastica of the human labyrinth capsule (otosclerosis, stapes ankylosis, spongification of the labyrinth capsule).
- Handbuch der pathologischen Anatomie des menschlichen Ohres (with Wilhelm Lange, Karl Grünberg), 1917 – Manual of pathological anatomy of the human ear.
- Anatomische Untersuchungen über die Tuberkulose der oberen Luftwege, 1927 – Anatomical studies of tuberculosis of the upper airways.
