= Ozeaneum =

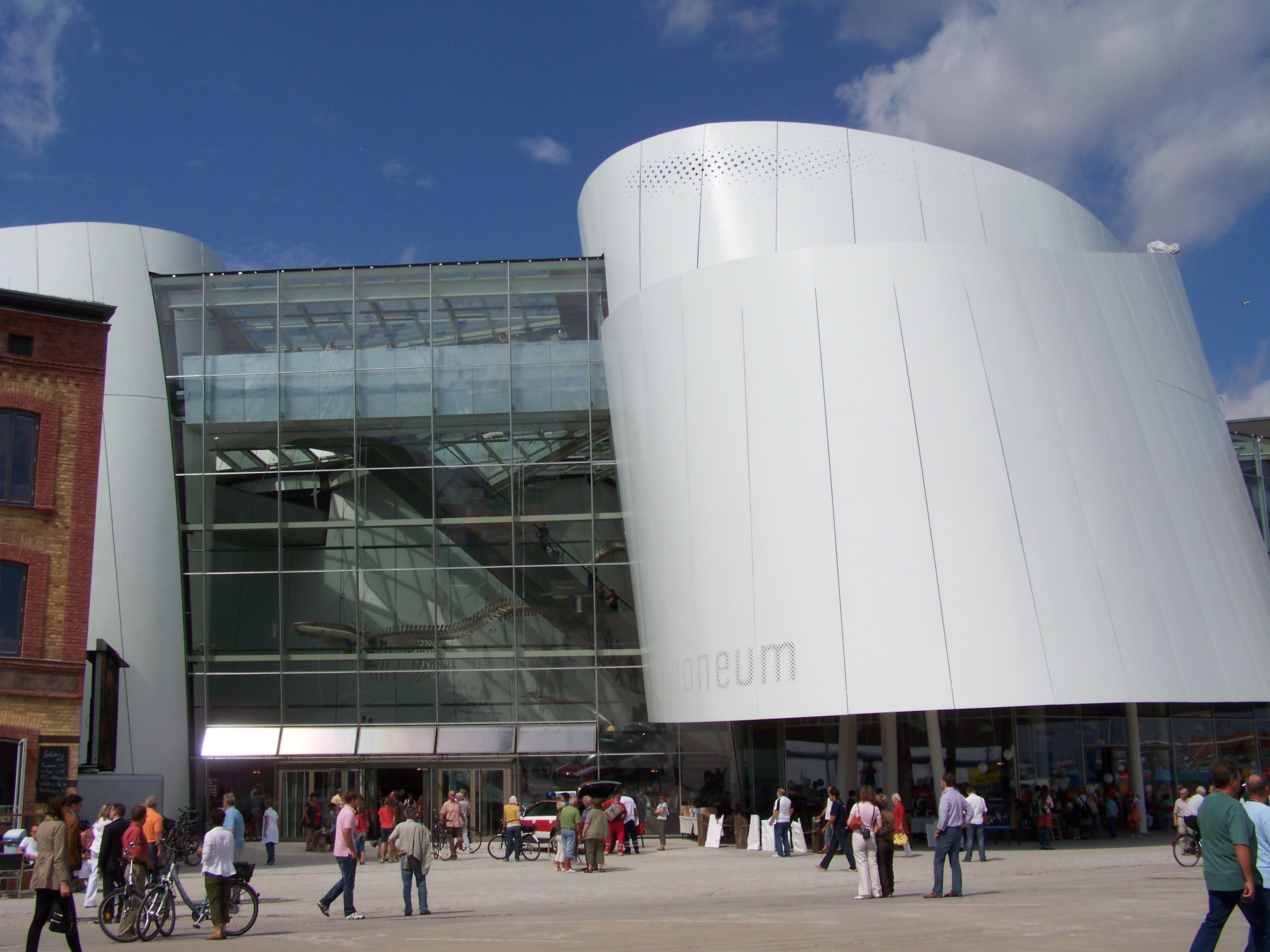
- Ozeaneum Stralsund
- Interactive map of Ozeaneum
- 54°18′56″N 13°5′49″E
- Date opened: July 2008
- Location: Stralsund, Germany
- Volume of largest tank: 2,600,000 L (690,000 US gal)
- Annual visitors: 1 million (first 12 months)
- Website: Official website

Ozeaneum is a public aquarium in the German city of Stralsund. It is a main attraction of the German Oceanographic Museum (Deutsches Meeresmuseum), arguably one of the three largest institutions of its kind in Europe.

The Ozeaneum — located at the historical Stralsund harbour on the Baltic coast — opened its doors in July 2008. It displays primarily sea life of the North Sea and the Baltic Sea.

The Ozeaneum was expected to be a major tourist attraction, and receive 550,000 visitors per year, but it quickly surpassed its goal and proved to be considerably more attractive than expected, and by the end of the first year had already had over 900,000 visitors. The millionth visit occurred on 27 July 2009.

On 22 May 2010, the OZEANEUM Stralsund received the European Museum of the Year Award in a ceremony in the Finnish town of Tampere.
