= Stralsund =

City in Mecklenburg-Vorpommern, Germany

- Town
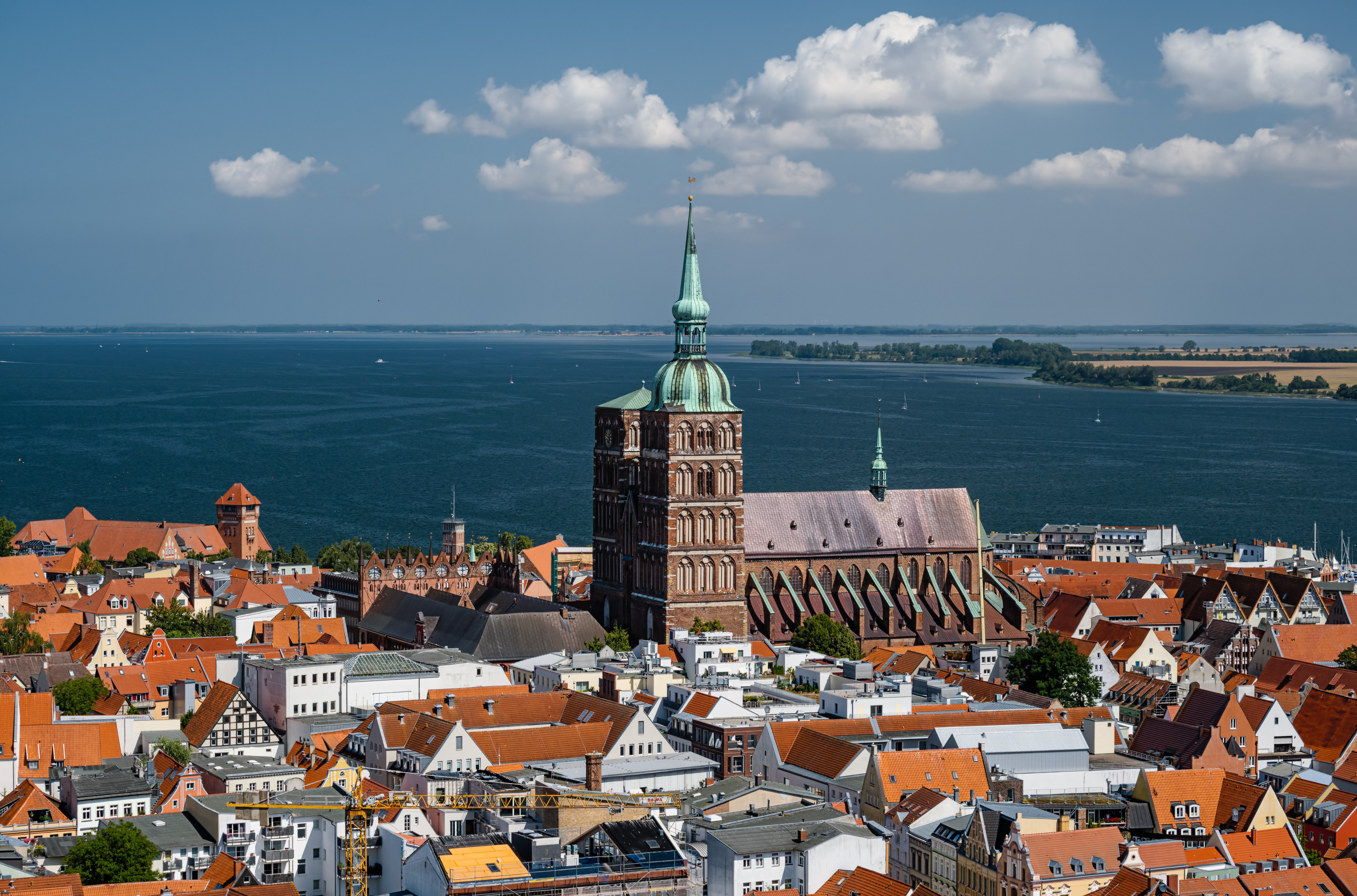
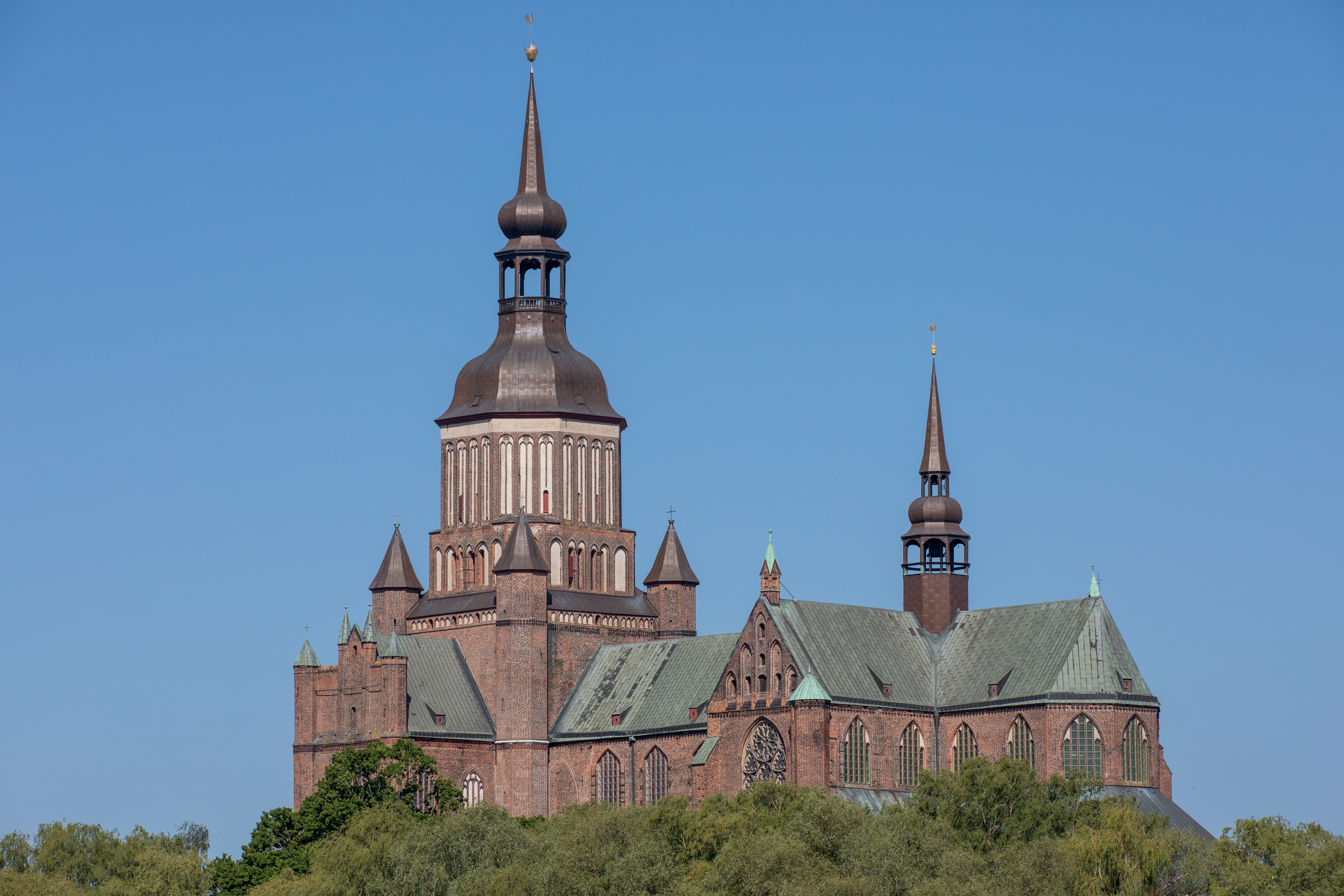
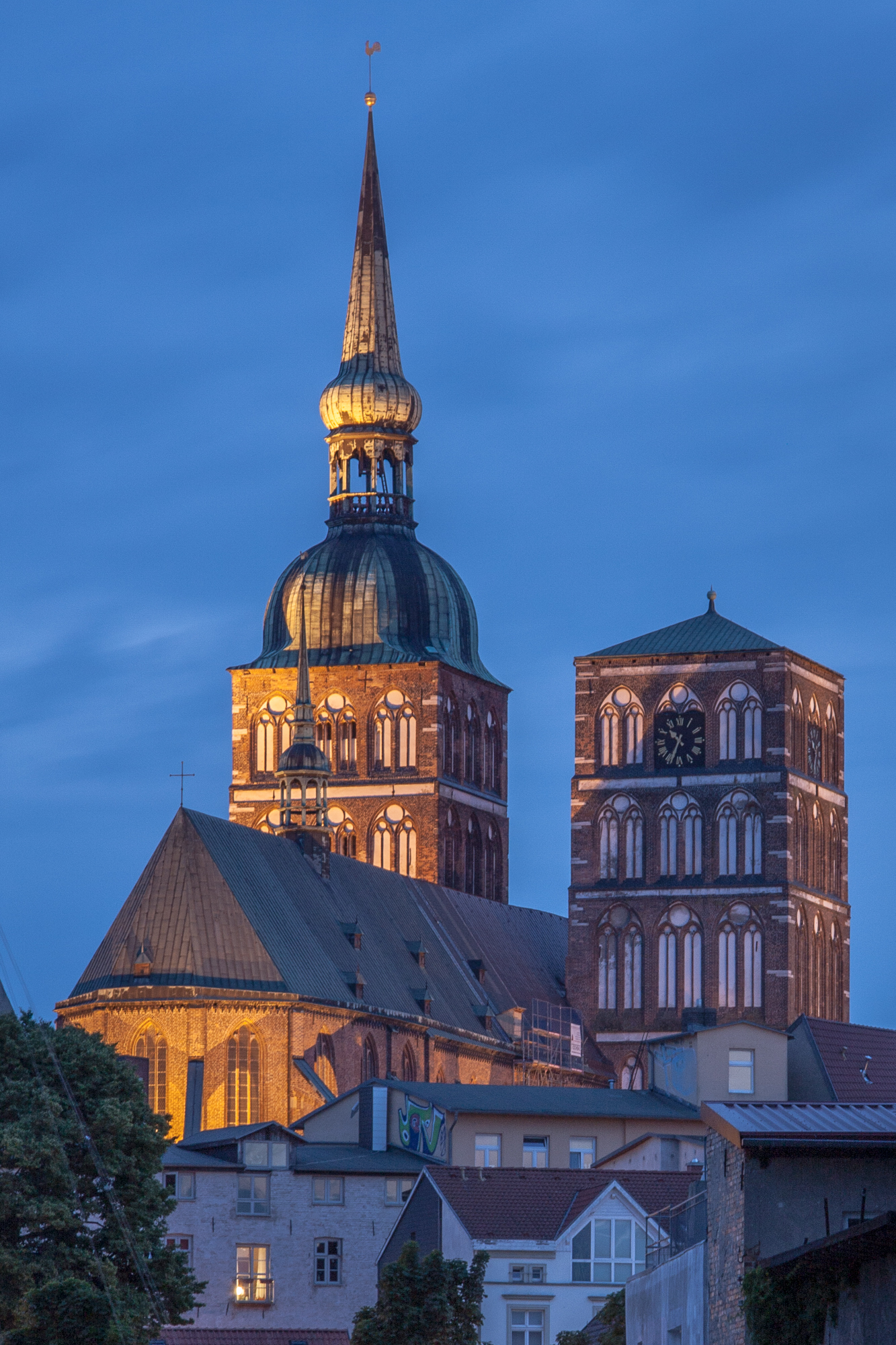
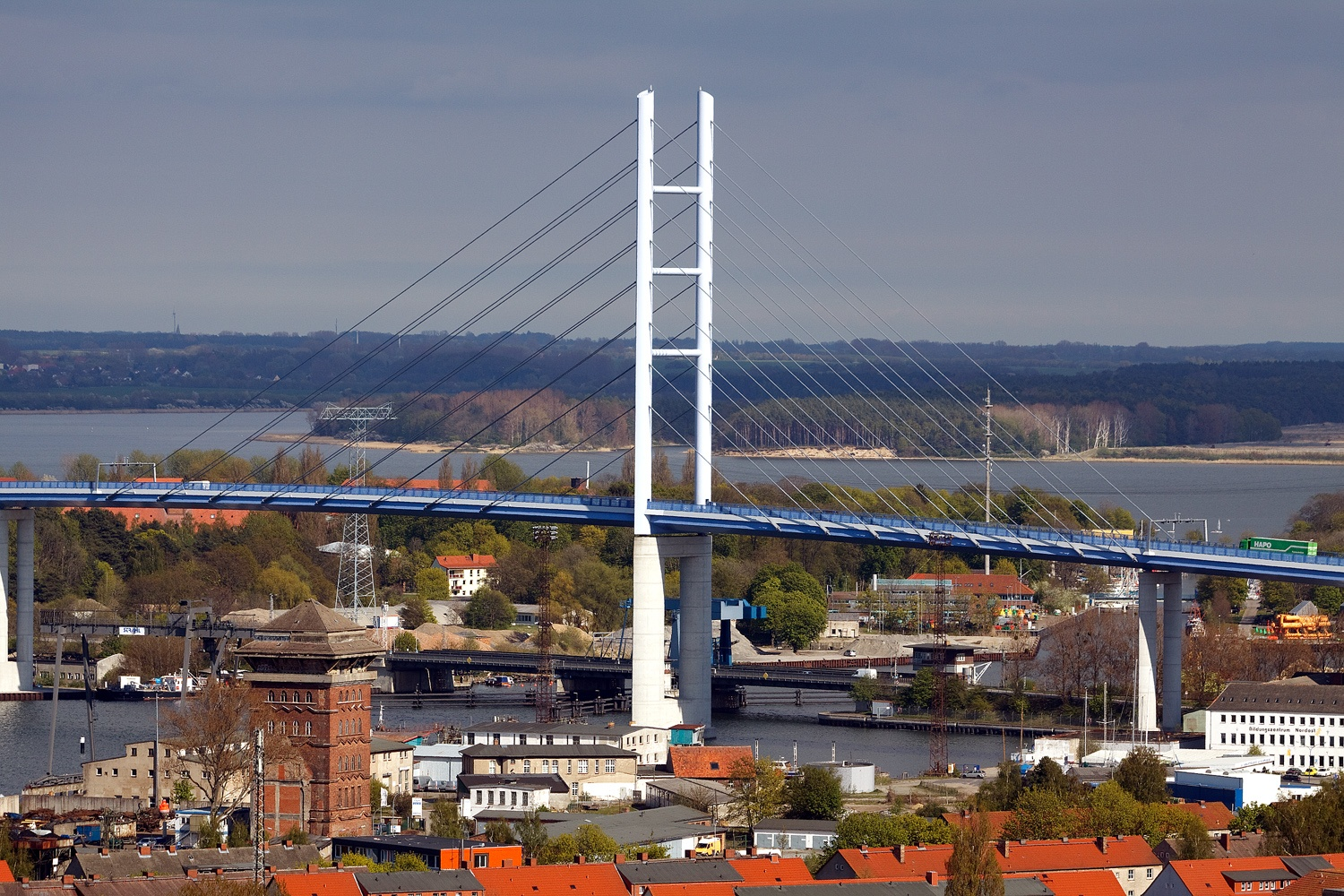
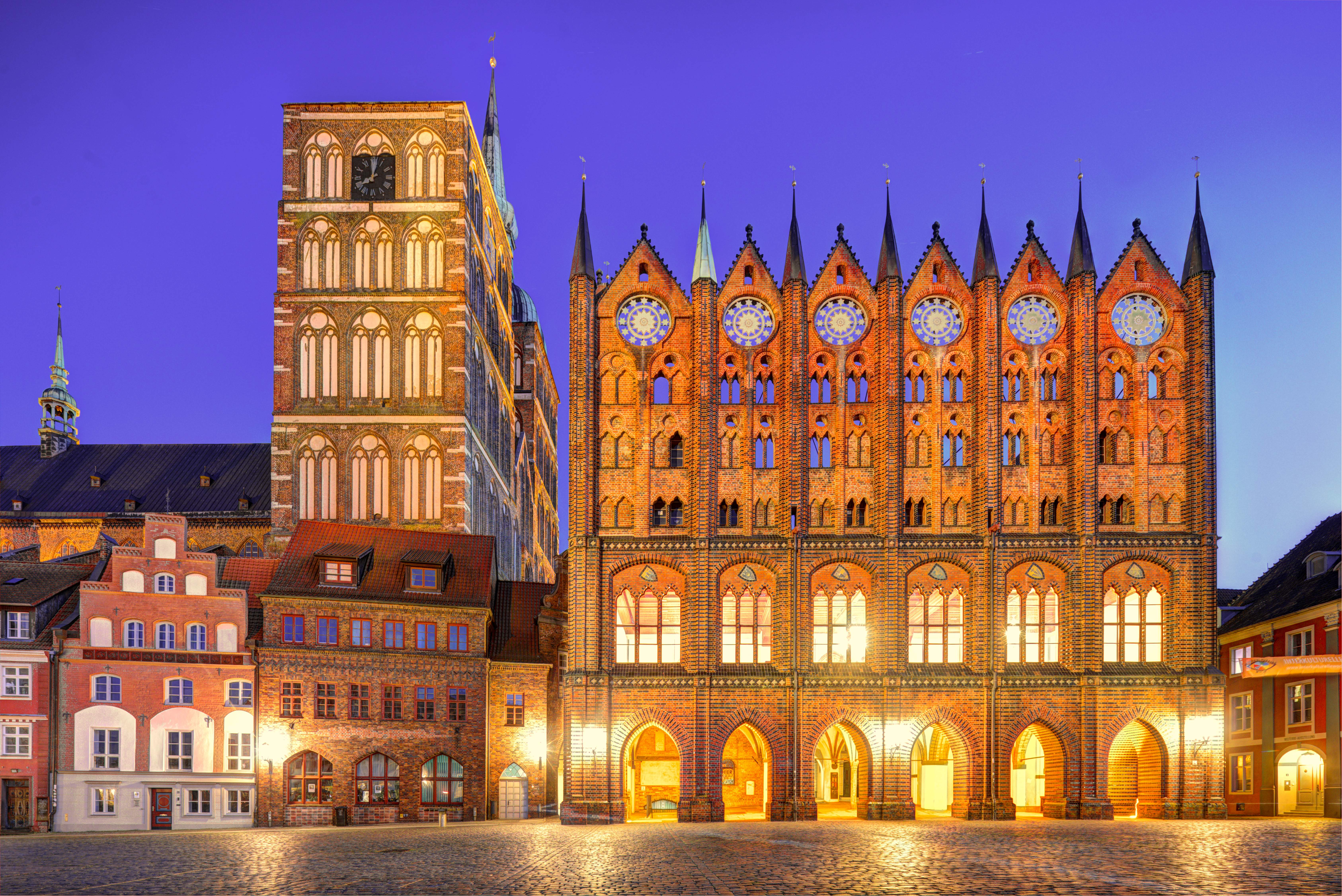
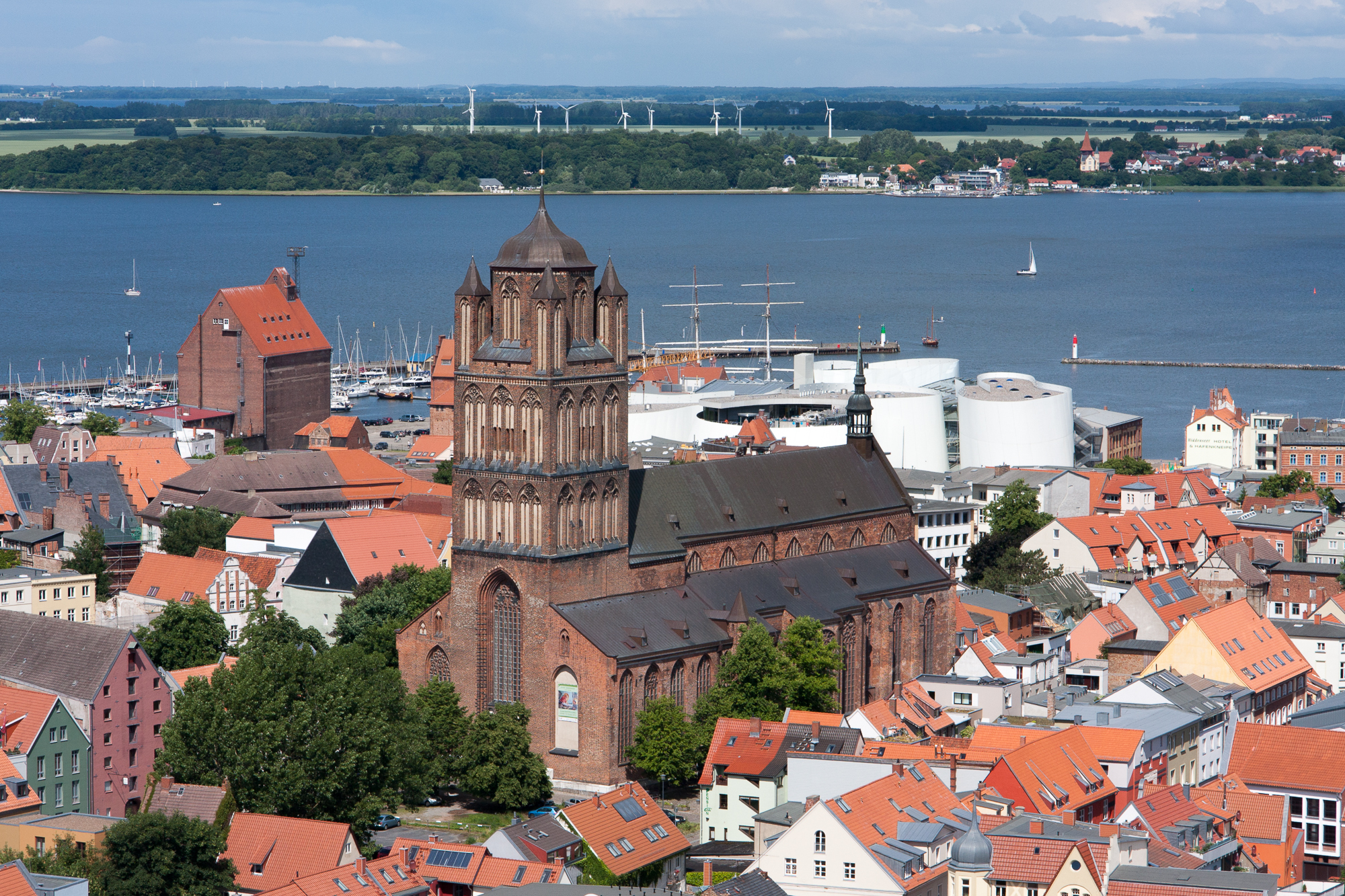
- Stralsund with Strelasund in the background St Mary's Church St Nick Rügenbrücke City hall St James' Church

- Flag Coat of arms

- Location of Stralsund within Vorpommern-Rügen district
- Interactive map of Stralsund
- Location within Germany Location within Mecklenburg-Vorpommern
- Coordinates: 54°18′33″N 13°04′55″E
- Country: Germany
- State: Mecklenburg-Vorpommern
- District: Vorpommern-Rügen
- Founded: 1168

Government
  - Mayor (2022–29): Alexander Badrow (CDU)

Area
  - Total: 54.14 km^{2} (20.90 sq mi)
- Elevation: 13 m (43 ft)

Population (2025-12-31)
  - Total: 55,481
  - Density: 1,025/km^{2} (2,654/sq mi)
- Time zone: UTC+01:00 (CET)
  - Summer (DST): UTC+02:00 (CEST)
- Postal codes: 18435, 18437, 18439
- Dialling codes: 03831
- Vehicle registration: HST
- Website: www.stralsund.de

Stralsund (German: [ˈʃtʁaːlzʊnt]; Swedish: Strålsund), officially the Hanseatic City of Stralsund (German: Hansestadt Stralsund), is the fifth-largest city in the northeastern German state of Mecklenburg-Western Pomerania after Rostock, Schwerin, Neubrandenburg and Greifswald, and the second-largest city in the Pomeranian part of the state. It is located on the southern coast of the Strelasund, a sound of the Baltic Sea separating the island of Rügen from the Pomeranian mainland.

The Strelasund Crossing with its two bridges and several ferry services connects Stralsund with Rügen, the largest island of Germany and Pomerania. The Western Pomeranian city is the seat of the Vorpommern-Rügen district and, together with Greifswald, Stralsund forms one of four high-level urban centres of the region.

Stralsund was granted city rights in 1234 and is thus the oldest city in Pomerania. It was one of the most prosperous members of the medieval Hanseatic League. In 1628, during the Thirty Years' War, the city came under Swedish rule and remained so until the upheavals of the Napoleonic Wars. It was the capital of Swedish Pomerania (New Western Pomerania) from 1720 to 1815. From 1815 to 1945, Stralsund was part of Prussia.

Stralsund's old town is part of the UNESCO World Heritage Site "Historic Centres of Stralsund and Wismar" alongside the old town of Wismar in Mecklenburg because of its outstanding Brick Gothic buildings and its importance during the time of the Hanseatic League and when the city belonged to Sweden. St Mary's Church was the tallest church in the world from 1549 to 1569 and from 1573 to 1647. The city's other two large churches are St Nicholas' and St James'. Stralsund is the seat of the German Oceanographic Museum (Deutsches Meeresmuseum) with its satellites Ozeaneum (in Stralsund), Nautineum (on Dänholm Island), and Natureum (on the Fischland-Darß-Zingst Peninsula).

The main industries of Stralsund are shipbuilding, fishing, mechanical engineering, and, to an increasing degree, tourism, life sciences, services and high tech industries, especially information technology and biotechnology.

== Etymology ==
In the Middle Ages the Dänholm isle and fishing village, both at the site of the latter city of Stralsund, were called Strale or Stralow, Polabian for "arrow" (Polish: strzała, Czech: střela). The city's name as well as that of the Strelasund are compounds of the Polabian stral and strela (arrow) and the Germanic sund, a strait or sound. The canting arms of the city make reference to that etymology as well as to Stralsund's Hanseatic past in featuring a silver cross pattée (a Hanseatic Cross) above a silver arrow.

The full Polabian name can be rendered in Polish as Strzałów.

== History ==
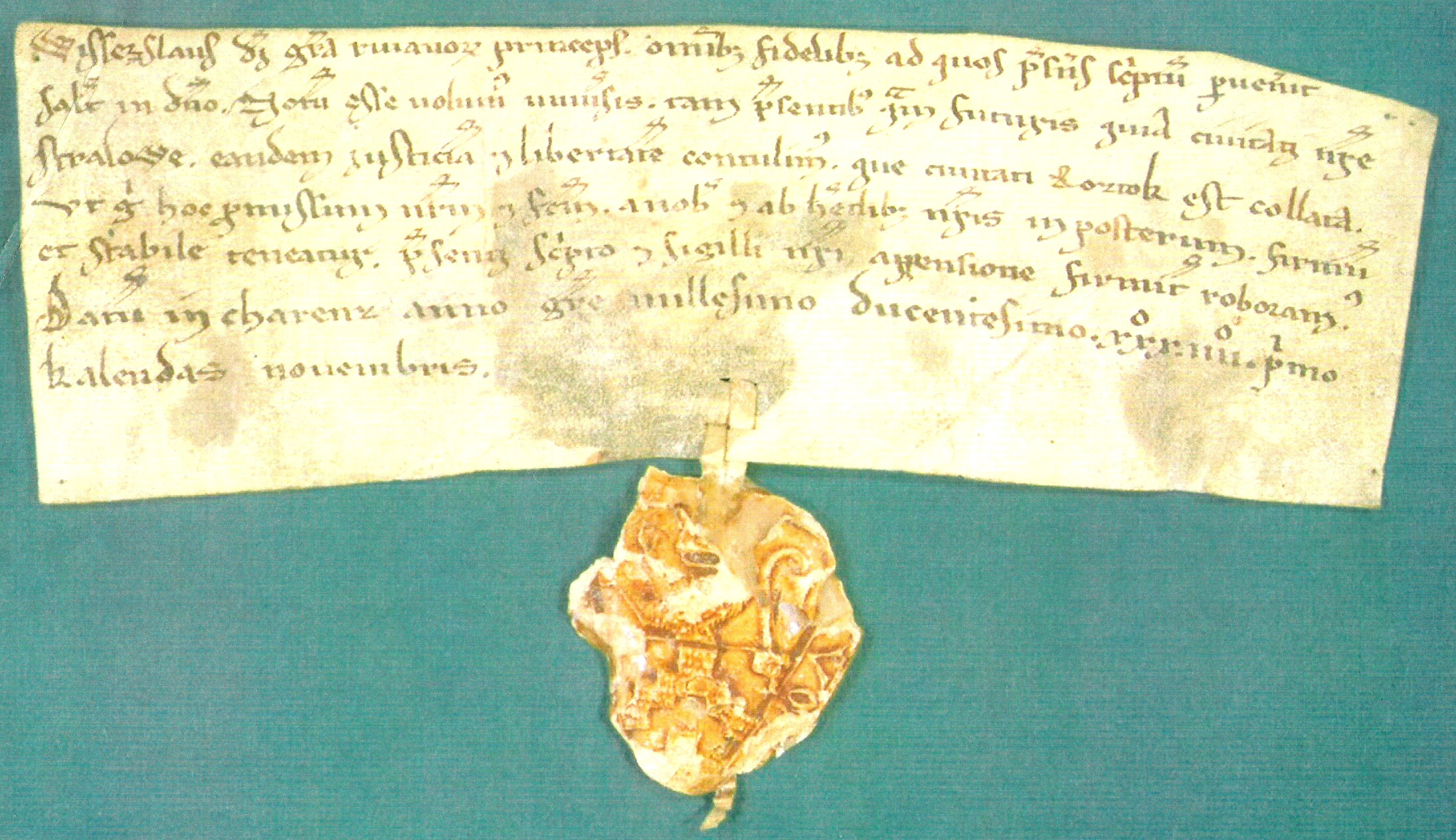
Foundation charter of 1234

In the Middle Ages, the Stralsund area formed part of the Principality of Rügen, a Danish vassal principality ruled by a local West Slavic dynasty. The village had a ferry to the island of Rügen. In 1168, following the siege of Arkona, the Principality of Rügen became part of Kingdom of Denmark.

In the course of German Ostsiedlung, many German settlers, gentry and merchants were invited to settle in the principality, and they eventually populated the Strale settlement. Merchants from other countries as well as locals were attracted to the area and made up one third of the settlement's population. The Danish navy used the isle as well. When the settlement had grown to town size, prince Wizlaw I of Rügen granted Lübeck law to "our town Stralow" in 1234, although a significant settlement had existed long before the formal founding. In 1240, when the prince gave additional land to the town, he called it Stralesund.

The success of the settlement challenged the powerful Free City of Lübeck, which burnt Stralsund down in 1249. Afterwards the town was rebuilt with a massive town wall having 11 town gates and 30 watchtowers. The Neustadt, a town-like suburb, had merged with Stralsund by 1361. Schadegard, a nearby twin city to Stralsund also founded by Wizlaw I, though not granted German law, served as the principal stronghold and enclosed a fort. It was given up and torn down by 1269 under pressure from the Stralsund Bürger.

In 1293 Stralsund became a member of the Hanseatic League. A total of 300 ships flying the flag of Stralsund cruised the Baltic Sea in the 14th century. In 1325 the Principality of Rügen became part of the Duchy of Pomerania, Stralsund however maintained considerable independence.

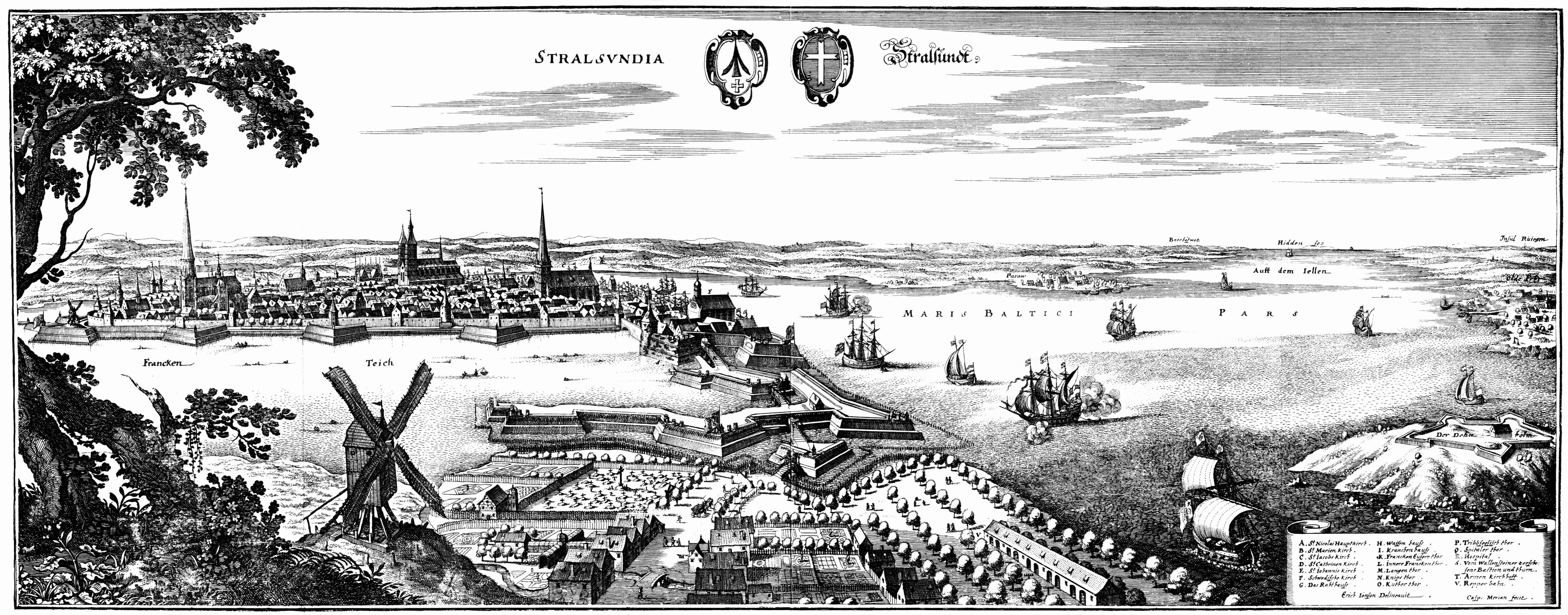
View of the town in the 17th century

In the 17th century opposing forces in the Thirty Years' War fought over Stralsund. In the Battle of Stralsund (1628), the Imperial (Catholic) forces commanded by Albrecht von Wallenstein besieged the city after the council refused to accept the Capitulation of Franzburg of November 1627. Stralsund resisted with Danish and Swedish support. The Swedish garrison in Stralsund was the first on German soil in history. With the Treaty of Stettin (1630), the city became one of two major Swedish forts in the Duchy of Pomerania, alongside Stettin (now Szczecin, Poland).

After the war, the Peace of Westphalia (1648) and the Treaty of Stettin (1653) made Stralsund part of Swedish Pomerania. Lost to Brandenburg in the Battle of Stralsund (1678), it reverted to Sweden in the Treaty of Saint-Germain-en-Laye (1679). In the Great Northern War in 1715 Charles XII led the defence of Stralsund for a year against the united European armies. Stralsund remained under Swedish control until the Battle of Stralsund (1807), when Napoleon Bonaparte's army occupied it. Seized by Ferdinand von Schill's freikorps in 1809, it subsequently reverted to French control, with Schill killed in action. With the Congress of Vienna (1815), Stralsund became part of the Kingdom of Prussia, within the Province of Pomerania, and served as the seat of a government region that largely corresponded to the former Swedish Pomerania.

Following the First World War Stralsund suffered the same sort of political unrest and unemployment that afflicted much of Germany. In May 1919 Stralsund workers clashed with police, and martial law was declared. In the early 1920s the Independent Social Democratic Party (USPD) became the strongest party in Stralsund, but its political fortunes waned rapidly, and in September 1922 it reunited with the Social Democratic Party (SPD). The Stralsunder Zeitung was published as a local newspaper in Stralsund.

In the national parliamentary election of May 1924, the conservative German National People's Party (DNVP) polled 8,547 votes in Stralsund, the SPD 3,534, the Communists 1,825 and the German People's Party (DVP) of Foreign Minister Gustav Stresemann 1,417. However, in keeping with national trends, Hitler's National Socialists made rapid gains in the late 1920s, and by the time of the last free national election in July 1932 the Nazis polled twice as many votes in Stralsund as the SPD.

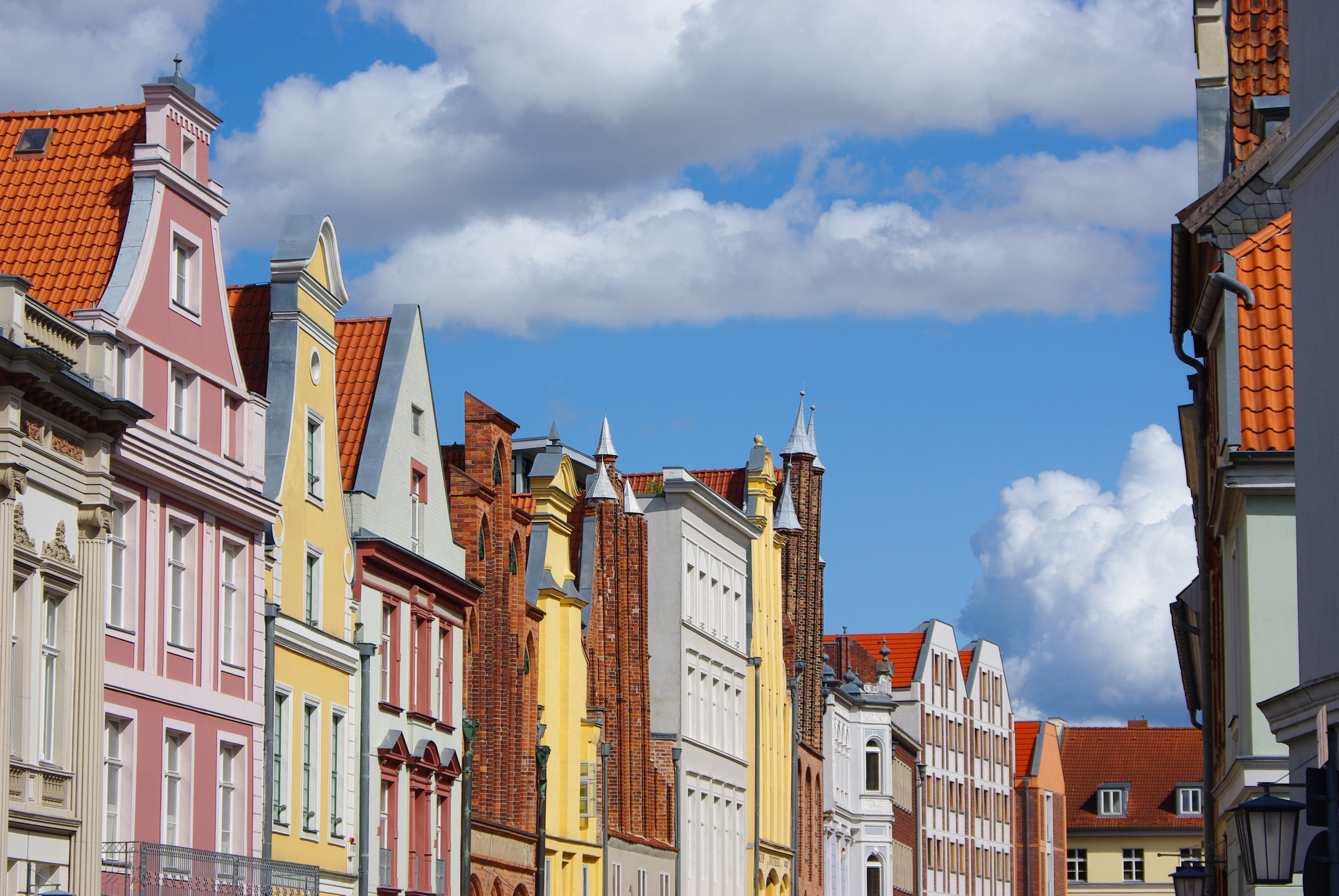
Typical street view of Stralsund: patrician houses with high gables from different eras, including the remarkable Brick Gothic and Renaissance

Residents of Stralsund cleaning the Alter Markt, May 1945

During the Nazi period (1933–1945), Stralsund's military installations expanded, and a naval training base opened on the nearby island of Dänholm. In World War II the city was subjected to repeated Allied bombing. Attacks by the U.S. Army Air Forces in 1944 killed some 800 Stralsunders and destroyed an estimated 8,000 dwellings. The 354th Rifle Division of the Red Army occupied Stralsund on 28 April 1945 – 10 days before the end of the war in Europe. Approximately half its population had fled.

During the period of the German Democratic Republic (GDR), Stralsund saw the construction of numerous Plattenbau prefabricated apartment blocks. Its economic life centered on the now state-owned shipyard, which largely focussed on building ships for the Soviet Union.

After German reunification in 1990, the city's historic old town was thoroughly restored, and Communist-era apartment blocks were renovated and upgraded. In 2002 the old towns of Stralsund and Wismar, some 120 km to the west, were listed as UNESCO World Heritage Sites. Stralsund's shipyard was privatized, and thereafter specialized in constructing container ships.

== Geography ==
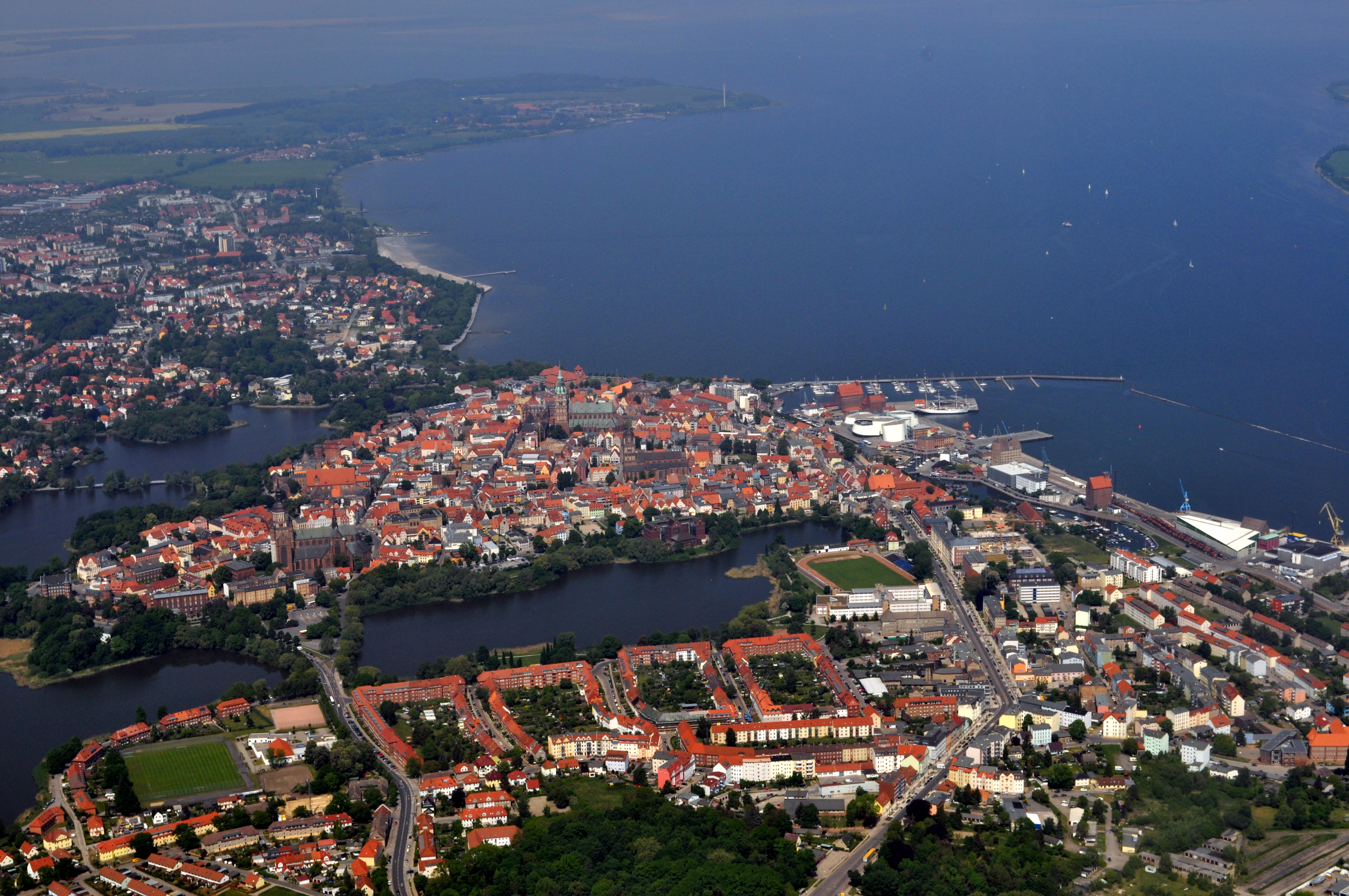
Aerial view of Stralsund Altstadt island

Stralsund is located in Mecklenburg-Vorpommern, a state in Western Pomerania region, Germany. in the state of Mecklenburg-Vorpommern. It is separated from Rügen to the southwest by the Strelasund, which empties into the Baltic Sea.

=== Climate ===
Average annual precipitation is 656 mm (25.8 inches), putting Stralsund within the lowest third of all such values in Germany. The driest month is February, the wettest July, with relatively little variation throughout the year.

Climate data for Stralsund, elevation: 13 m, 1991–2021 normals
Month	Jan	Feb	Mar	Apr	May	Jun	Jul	Aug	Sep	Oct	Nov	Dec	Year
Mean daily maximum °C (°F)	2.9 (37.2)	3.7 (38.7)	6.9 (44.4)	12.0 (53.6)	16.6 (61.9)	19.8 (67.6)	22.2 (72.0)	21.8 (71.2)	18.1 (64.6)	12.9 (55.2)	7.8 (46.0)	4.4 (39.9)	12.4 (54.4)
Daily mean °C (°F)	1.1 (34.0)	1.4 (34.5)	3.8 (38.8)	8.1 (46.6)	12.8 (55.0)	16.2 (61.2)	18.7 (65.7)	18.3 (64.9)	14.9 (58.8)	10.3 (50.5)	5.9 (42.6)	2.7 (36.9)	9.5 (49.1)
Mean daily minimum °C (°F)	−0.9 (30.4)	−0.8 (30.6)	0.7 (33.3)	4.2 (39.6)	8.6 (47.5)	12.2 (54.0)	14.9 (58.8)	14.7 (58.5)	11.8 (53.2)	7.8 (46.0)	3.9 (39.0)	0.9 (33.6)	6.5 (43.7)
Average precipitation mm (inches)	54.0 (2.13)	45.0 (1.77)	50.0 (1.97)	48.0 (1.89)	62.0 (2.44)	77.0 (3.03)	84.0 (3.31)	82.0 (3.23)	61.0 (2.40)	56.0 (2.20)	52.0 (2.05)	55.0 (2.17)	726 (28.59)
Average precipitation days	9	8	8	8	9	9	10	10	8	8	9	9	105
Mean monthly sunshine hours	83.7	103.6	164.3	261.0	313.3	318.0	331.7	303.8	219.0	155.0	90.0	71.3	2,414.7
Source: Climate-Data.org

=== Landscape ===
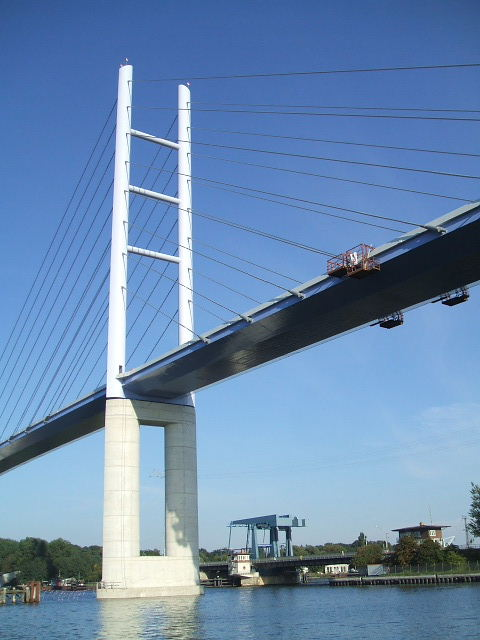
Rügen Bridge, Germany's largest bridge, connects Stralsund with Rügen Island

The city lies on the sound of Strelasund, a strait of the Baltic Sea. Its geographic proximity to the island of Rügen, whose only fixed link to the mainland, the Strelasund Crossing, runs between Stralsund and the village of Altefähr, has given Stralsund the sobriquet "Gateway to the Island of Rügen" (Tor zur Insel Rügen). Stralsund is located close to the Western Pomerania Lagoon Area National Park.

Stralsund's city borough includes municipal forest and three municipal ponds (the Knieperteich, Frankenteich and Moorteich. The three ponds and the Strelasund lend the Old Town, the original settlement site and historic centre of the city, a protected island ambience. The highest point of the city is the Galgenberg ("Gallows Hill") on its western approaches.

=== Subdivisions ===
The city's territory covers an area of 54.07 km^{2} (20.88 sq mi), which makes Stralsund, with its nearly 58,000 inhabitants one of the most densely populated cities in Mecklenburg-Western Pomerania (1,480 inhabitants per km^{2}).

The borough of the Hanseatic city of Stralsund is divided into as follows:

No.	Area	Quarter	Population (as of Dec. 2015)
01	Altstadt (Old Town)		5,942
011	Altstadt	Altstadt	5,630
012	Altstadt	Hafeninsel (Harbour Island)	24
013	Altstadt	Bastionengürtel	288
02	Knieper		24,966
021	Knieper	Kniepervorstadt	6,059
022	Knieper	Knieper Nord	6,597
023	Knieper	Knieper West	12,310
03	Tribseer		9,876
031	Tribseer	Tribseer Vorstadt	5,204
032	Tribseer	Tribseer Siedlung	3,431
033	Tribseer	Tribseer Wiesen	1,129
034	Tribseer	Schrammsche Mühle	112
04	Franken		6,660
041	Franken	Frankenvorstadt	5,209
042	Franken	Dänholm	316
043	Franken	Franken Mitte	365
044	Franken	Frankensiedlung	770
05	Süd		3,947
051	Süd	Andershof	3,297
052	Süd	Devin	576
053	Süd	Voigdehagen	74
06	Lüssower Berg		225
07	Langendorfer Berg		318
08	Grünhufe		6,307
081	Grünhufe	Stadtkoppel	320
082	Grünhufe	Vogelsang	2,240
083	Grünhufe	Grünthal-Viermorgen	3,687
084	Grünhufe	Freienlande	60

The city also possesses estates in the local area as well as on the islands of Rügen, Hiddensee and Ummanz.

=== Neighbouring municipalities ===
Larger cities in the nearby area are Greifswald and Rostock. In the local area around Stralsund there are also the towns of Barth and Ribnitz-Damgarten.

Many of the smaller villages in the vicinity, like Prohn or Negast, have grown sharply after 1990 as a result of the influx of those living or working in Stralsund.

== Culture and sights ==
Stralsund
UNESCO World Heritage Site
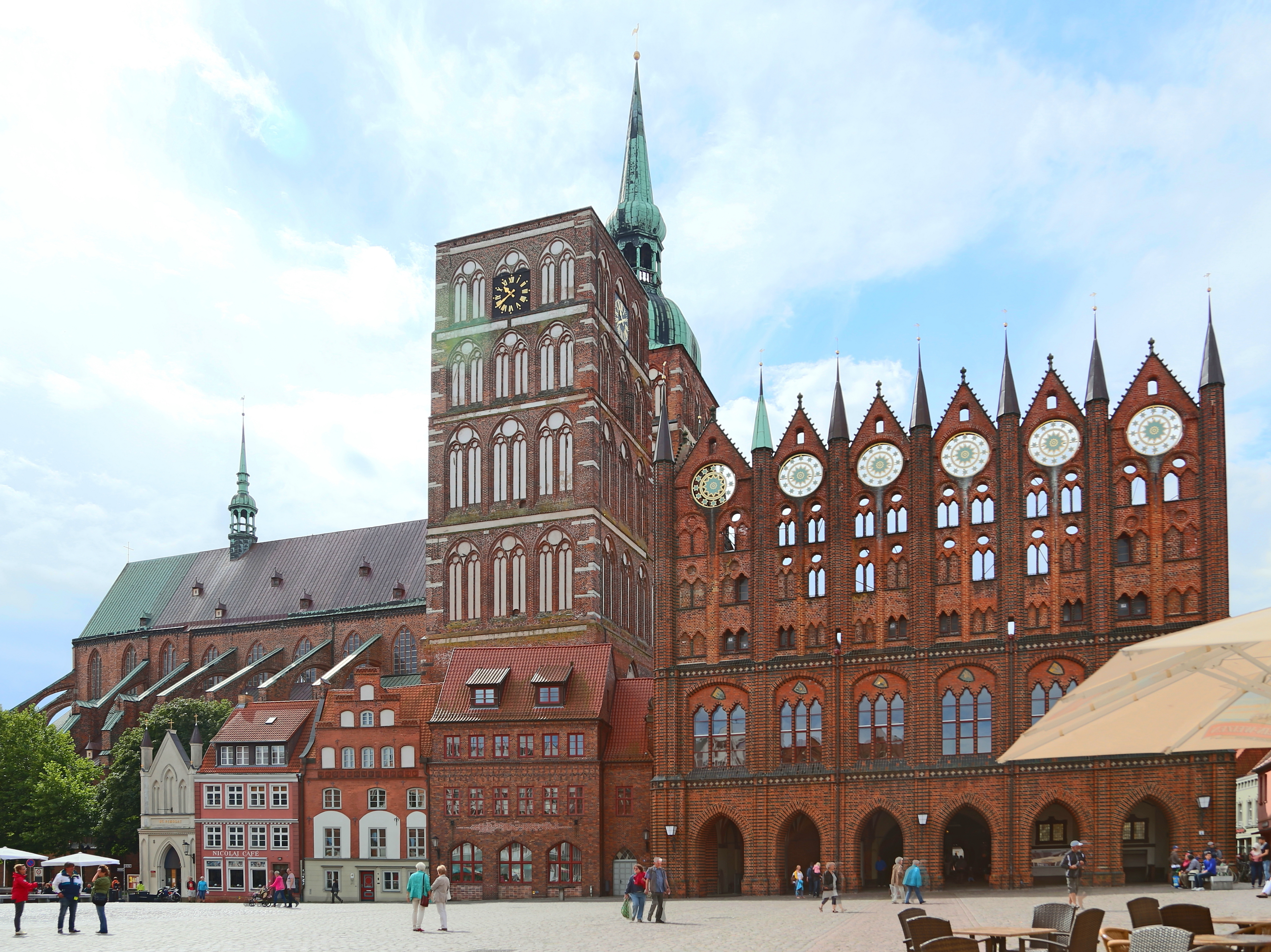
- Stralsund: Alter Markt Square with the city hall and the St. Nicholas Church
- Interactive map of Stralsund
- Part of: Historic Centres of Stralsund and Wismar
- Criteria: Cultural: ii, iv
- Reference: 1067
- Inscription: 2002 (26th Session)
- Area: 80 ha (200 acres)
- Buffer zone: 340 ha (840 acres)

=== Main sights ===
- The historic Stralsund old town island is a UNESCO World Heritage Site. It features many valuable remnants of the Hanseatic time, Brick Gothic, renaissance, baroque, historicist and Jugendstil buildings.
- The heart of the old town is the Alter Markt Square ("Old Market"), with the Gothic city hall (13th century). Behind the city hall soars the imposing St. Nicholas' Church, built in 1270–1360. The square is surrounded by houses from different periods, including the Gothic Wulflamhaus (a 14th-century patrician house, today a restaurant), and the Baroque Commandantenhus of 1751, the old headquarters of the Swedish military commander.
- Saint James' Church, built in mid-14th century. It was destroyed several times, e.g. by Wallenstein and in World War II.
- Saint Mary's Church, built in 1383–1473 in Gothic style, is the largest church in Stralsund, and from 1625 to 1647 it was the world's tallest structure. Its octagonal tower (104 meters high) offers a panorama view of Stralsund and the neighboring islands of Rügen and Hiddensee.

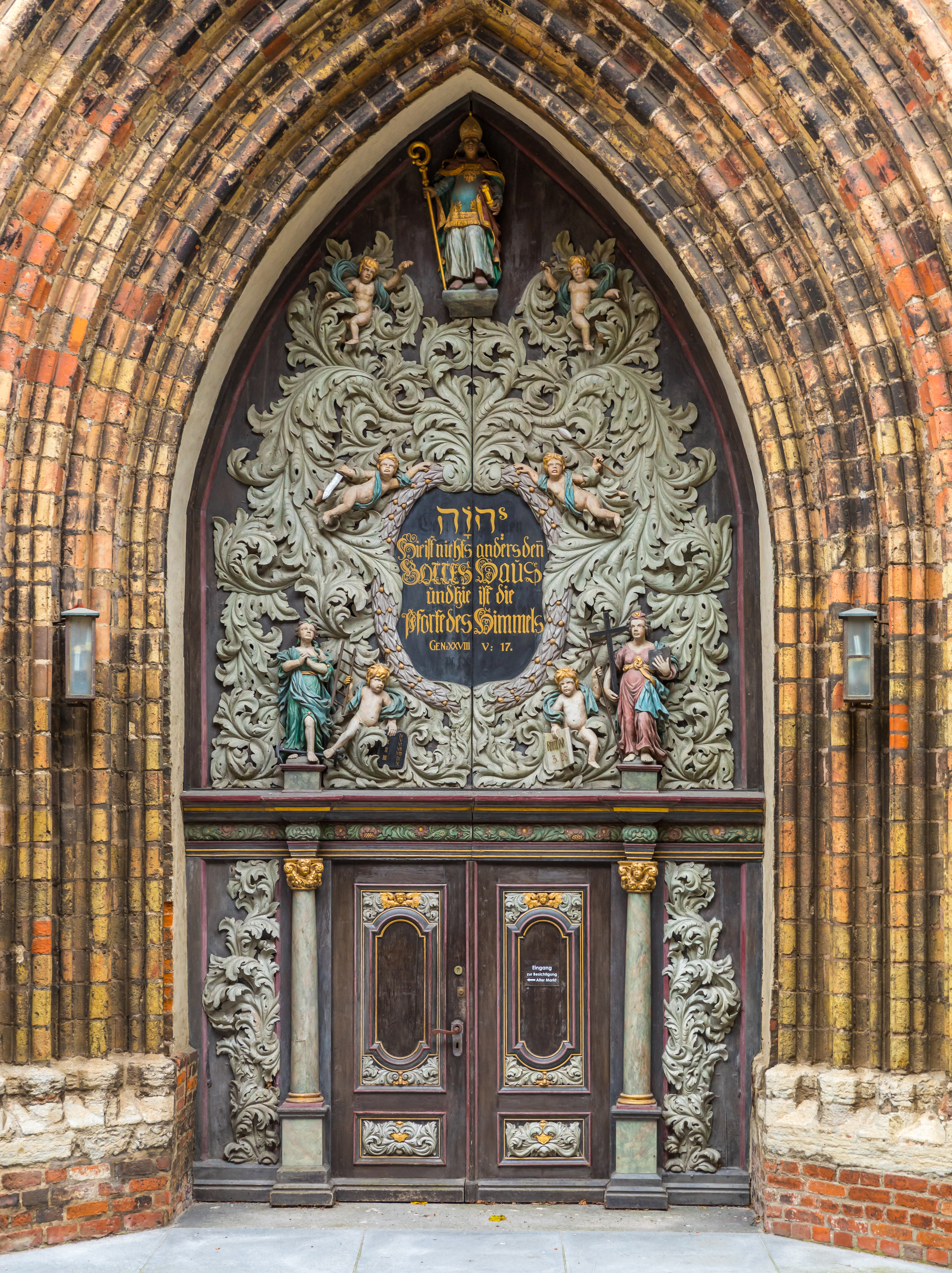
Portal of the St. Nicholas Church

- St. John's Abbey (Franciscan monastery built in 1254) is one of the oldest buildings in the city.
- Stralsund is the port of registry for the former German Reichsmarine Navy Sail Training ship "Gorch Fock" 1. It is now a floating museum.
- The Monastery of Saint Catherine, mainly built in the 15th century, houses two museums today: Stralsund's Museum of Cultural History (known for e.g. the Gold Jewellery of Hiddensee), and the German Oceanographic Museum, Germany's largest aquarium and oceanographic collection. The ancient refectory of the monastery is one of the most spectacular Gothic interiors in Germany.
- Besides the mentioned German Oceanographic Museum at the Katharinenkloster, Stralsund has other museums dedicated to marine life, including the popular Ozeaneum that was voted European Museum of the Year in 2010. There is also a nautical centre, the Nautineum, on Dänholm island and the Marinemuseum Dänholm, showcasing the military history of the German Navy, especially the interwar Reichsmarine. It also hosts one of the last remaining GDR Volksmarine (People's Navy) torpedo boats.

=== Buildings and monuments ===
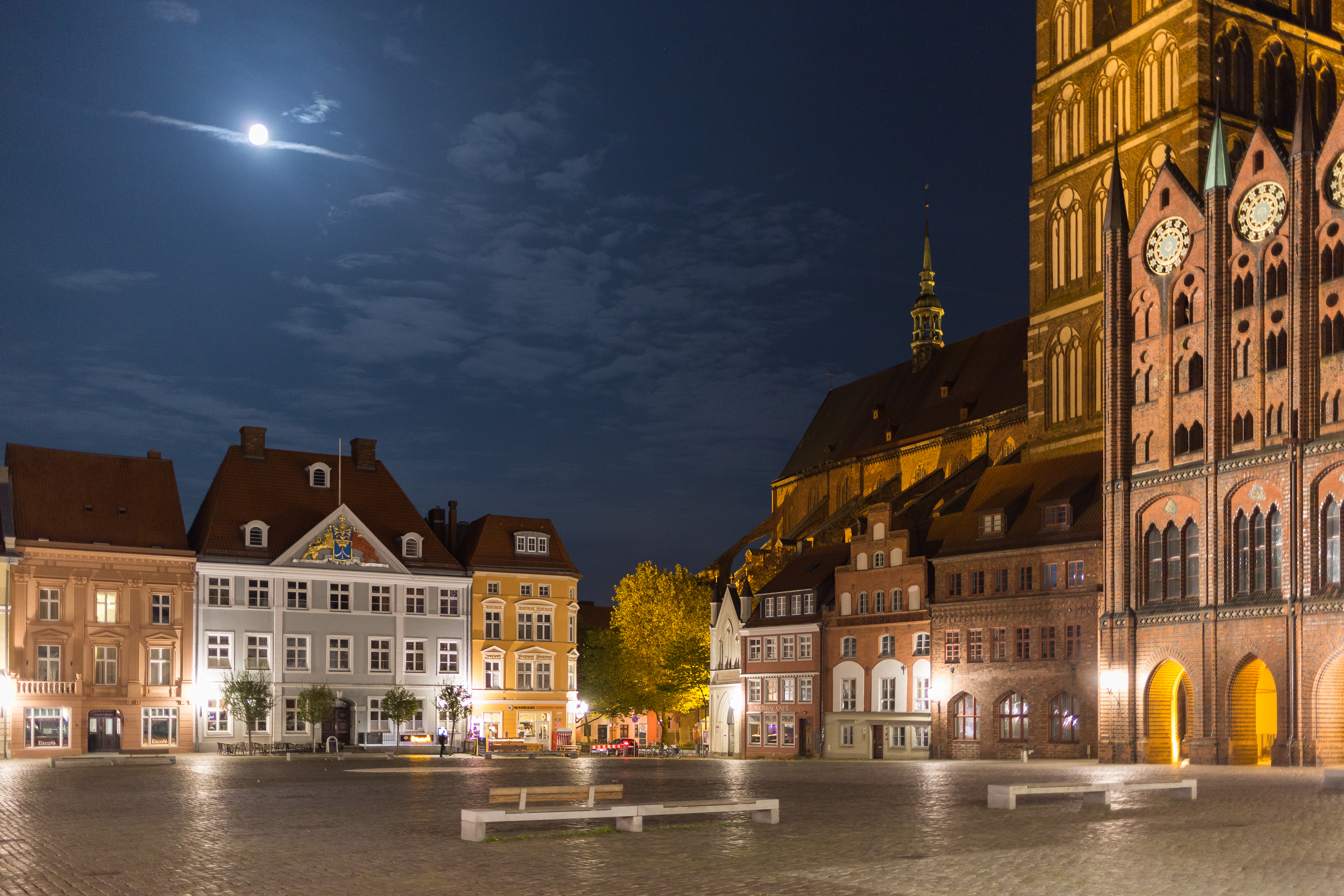
Alter Markt Square

Old Town (Altstadt)

The centre of Stralsund has a wealth of historic buildings. Since 1990, large parts of the historic old town have been renovated with private and public capital, and with the support of foundations. As a result of the contempt for historic buildings in East Germany many houses were threatened by ruin. The Old Town in particular offers a rich variety of historic buildings, with many former merchants' houses, churches, streets and squares.

Of more than 800 listed buildings in Stralsund, more than 500 are designated as individual monuments in the Old Town. In twenty years, from the Wende (turning point) in 1990 to November 2010, 588 of the more than 1,000 old buildings were completely refurbished, including 363 individual monuments. Because of its historical and architectural significance, in 2002 Stralsund's old town together with the old town of Wismar were added to entitled the UNESCO World Cultural Heritage list as the "Historic Centres of Stralsund and Wismar".

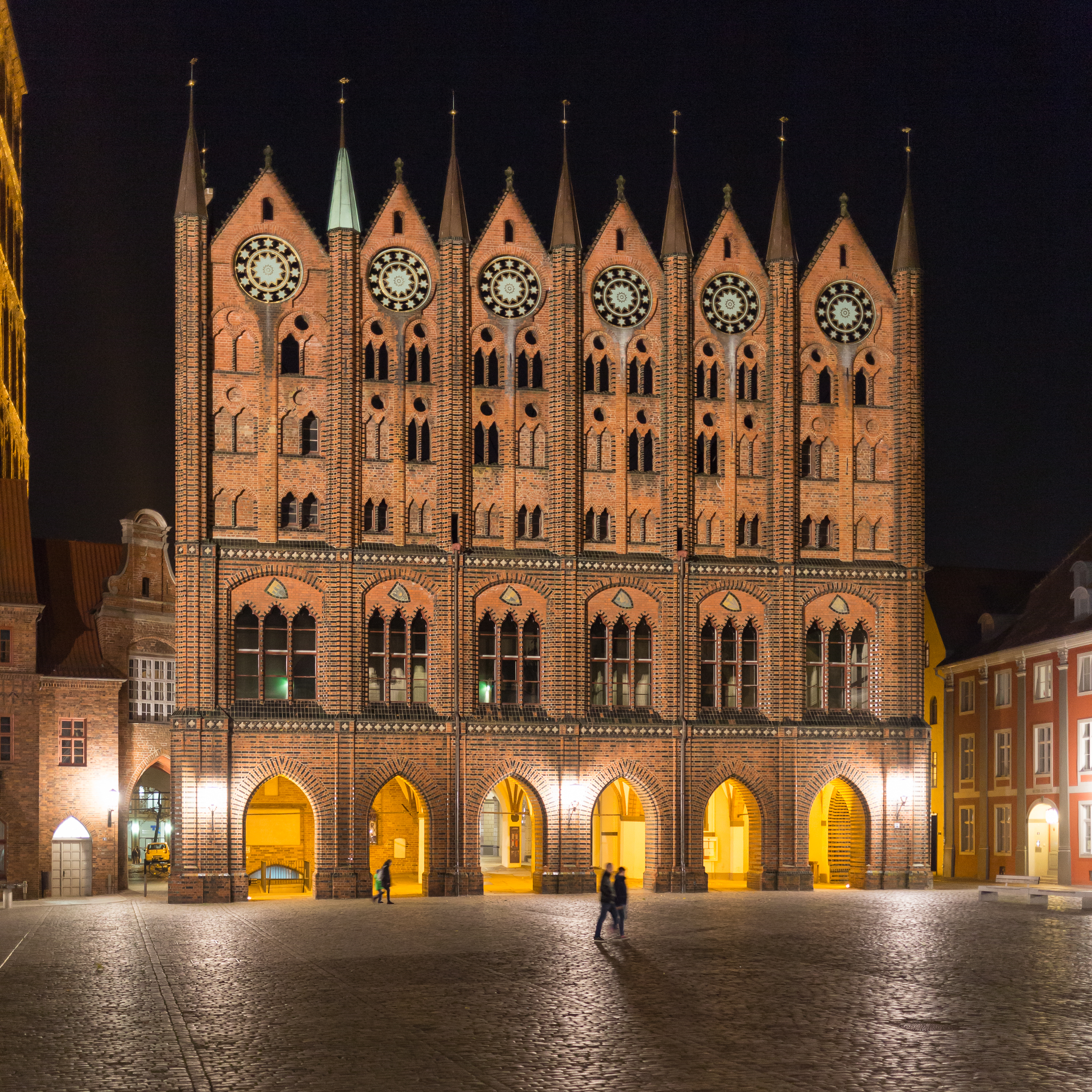
The city hall

Alter Markt Square

On the Alter Markt Square there is the main landmark of Stralsund: the Brick Gothic city hall from Hanseatic times. This building from 1278 features a remarkable "show façade" that serves the sole purpose of displaying wealth of the city. Citizens can walk through the city hall and its gallery. It also features one of Europe's largest Gothic cellar vaults. The ensemble of buildings on the Alter Markt Square includes the St. Nicholas Church, the Artushof, the Wulflamhaus, the Commandantenhus, the Gewerkschaftshaus and a new apartment complex.

Old Town houses

The historic houses with their distinctive gables, often renovated at a high financial cost, dominate the scene in the streets of the Old Town. The former Swedish Government Palace is now home to the city construction department. The Museum of Cultural History Museum in Mönchstrasse, in one of the most important surviving original houses of the Hanseatic era, was refurbished with funds from the German Foundation for Monument Conservation It offers a guide to understanding the city's history over seven centuries.

Churches

Three large medieval Brick Gothic buildings – St. Mary's Church, St. Nicholas Church and St. James Church, point to the medieval significance of Stralsund. Today St. James' is used purely as a cultural venue, its parish being served now by the Church of the Holy Spirit, which also dates from the 14th century. Two other churches on the Alter Markt Square and the Neuer Markt are still used for church services. The tower of St. Mary's on the Neuer Markt offers a panoramic view over Stralsund and the island of Rügen.

Monasteries

St. John's Abbey, a Franciscan monastery from 1254, now houses the Stralsund City Archives. Regular cultural events also take place here, such as open-air theatre productions.

The Gothic abbey of St. Anne and St. Bridget in Schillstrasse was established around 1560 from the merger of the abbey of St. Anne (1480) and the double abbey of Mariakron (1421).

The Abbey of St. Jürgen on Mönchstrasse was mentioned in 1278 for the first time. It served in the 14th century as an old people's home. In 1743 a new building, the Kleines St. Jürgen Kloster, was built at Kniepertor and the site was extended in 1754 to create old people's flats and in 1841 for widow's apartments.

First mentioned in 1256, the Heilgeistkloster is now the Hospital of the Holy Spirit.

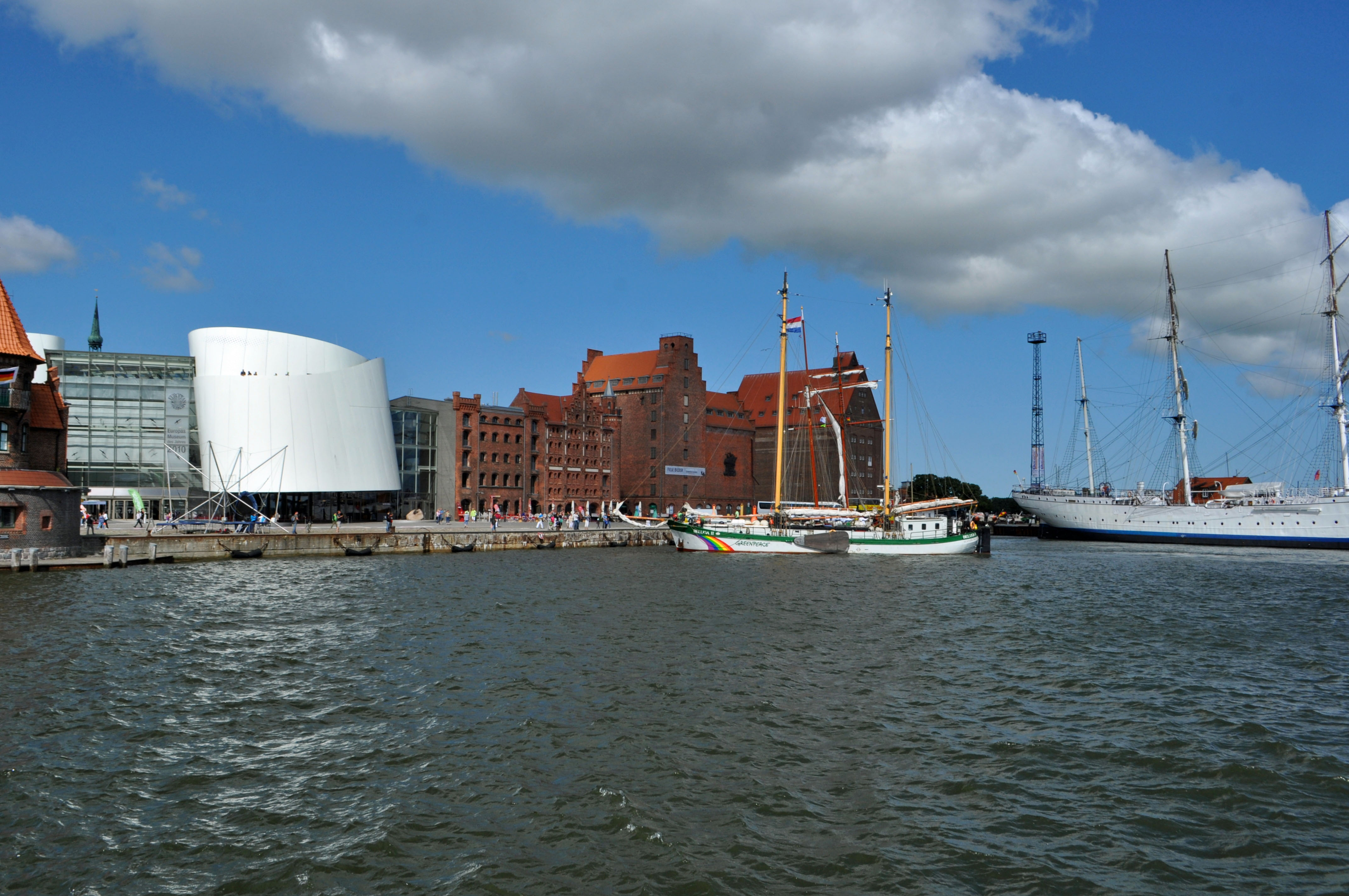
Old Port with Ozeaneum, warehouses and historical ships including the Gorch Fock

Port

Ferries to Hiddensee and Altefähr, as well as harbor tour boats, dock at the port. In the summer months the port is a berthing places for river cruisers. There are several yacht harbors and marinas near the Old Town. Hundreds of yachts and boats tie up along the north mole in summer. Architecturally the pilot station and the harbor warehouse (Hafenspeicher), as well as the silhouette of the Old Town, form a unique tableau of different historical eras. The barque and former sailor's training ship, Gorch Fock is another tourist attraction at the harbor.

== Education ==
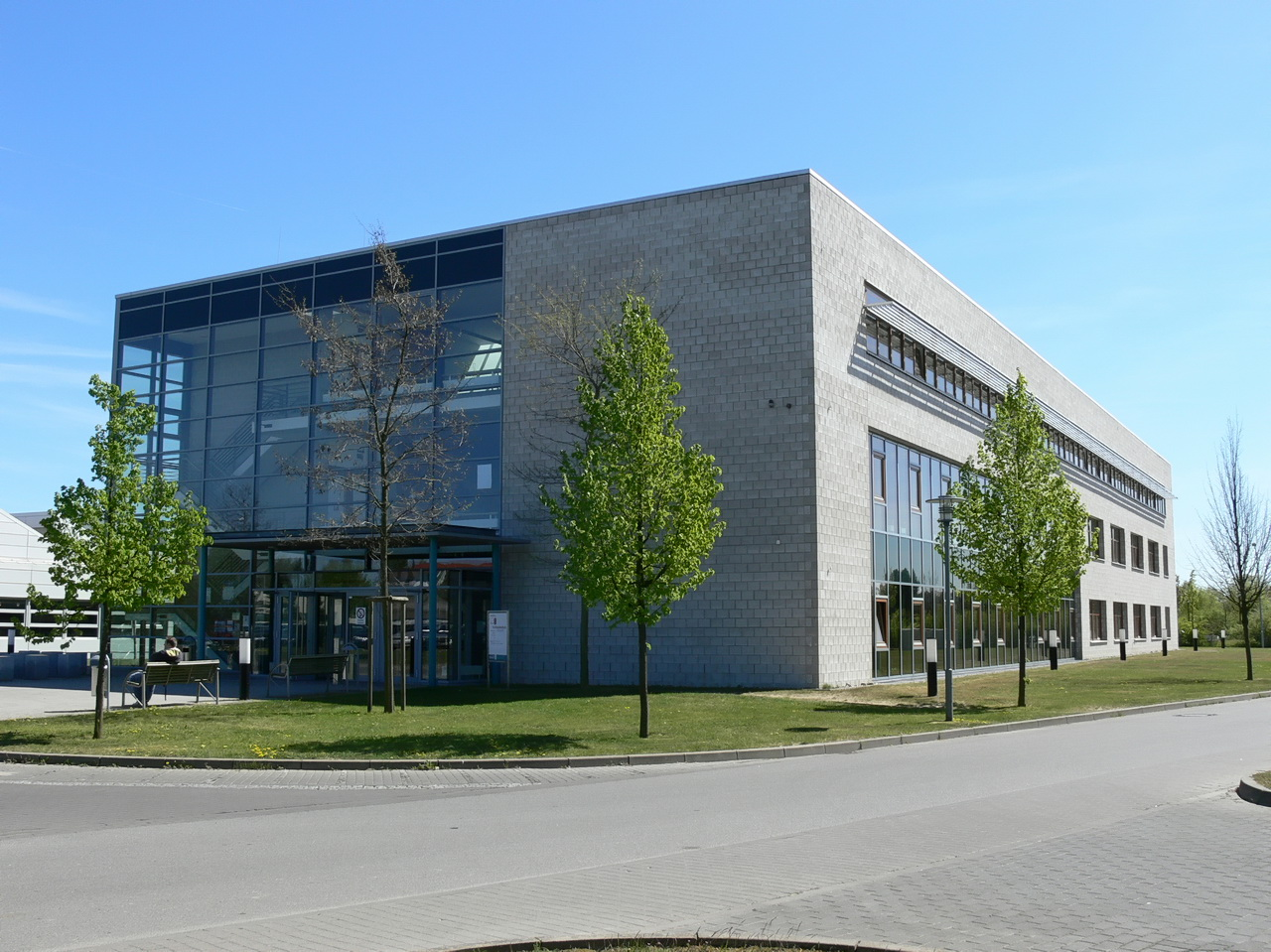
University of Applied Sciences Stralsund, Department of Economics

The Fachhochschule Stralsund is a University of Applied Sciences with a modern campus, north of the old town at the Strelasund. It has around 2,500 students and is among the best ranked public universities in Germany in various fields, especially in economics. Other university departments are Mechanical Engineering, Electrical Engineering and Information Technology. The FH Stralsund also offers international study programs, such as Leisure and Tourism Management and Baltic Management Studies (international business management).

== Transport ==
Stralsund is linked to the A20 motorway (towards Berlin and Hamburg), via the B96n dual-carriageway. Other major roads include the B105 (beginning in the city centre and continuing to Rostock) and the B96 (major road to Rügen) and the B194 to the town of Grimmen.

Stralsund Hauptbahnhof is on the line to Berlin, Rostock, Pasewalk and Bergen.

When travelling by air, passengers usually do so via Rostock–Laage Airport with connecting flights from Munich. A small airport, Stralsund Barth Airport, also serves the city locally.

City buses are run by SWS (Stadtwerke Stralsund).

== Governance ==
The current mayor of Stralsund is Alexander Badrow (CDU) since 2008. The most recent mayoral election was held on 8 May 2022, and the results were as follows:

Candidate	Party	Votes	%
Alexander Badrow	Christian Democratic Union	13,785	67.3
Melanie Rocksien-Riad	Greens/SPD	4,860	23.7
Marc Quintana Schmidt	The Left	1,843	9.0
Valid votes		20,488	99.1
Invalid votes		182	0.9
Total		20,670	100.0
Electorate/voter turnout		48,869	42.3
Source: City of Stralsund

The most recent city council election was held on 9 June 2024, and the results were as follows:

Party	Votes	%	+/-	Seats	+/-
Christian Democratic Union (CDU)	19,890	25.5	▲5.5	11	▲2
Alternative for Germany (AfD)	16,642	21.4	▲8.4	9	▲3
Citizens for Stralsund (BfS)	14,052	18.0	▲0.4	8	0
Alliance 90/The Greens (Grüne)	7,023	9.0	▼6.0	4	▼2
The Left (Die Linke)	6,892	8.8	▼4.7	4	▼2
Social Democratic Party (SPD)	6,032	7.7	▼1.6	3	▼1
Free Democratic Party (FDP)	2,265	2.9	▼0.7	1	▼1
Die PARTEI	2,214	2.8	▲0.8	1	0
Pirate Party (Piraten)	871	1.1	▲0.2	1	▲1
Voter Group Adomeit	618	0.8	▼1.8	1	0
The Homeland (HEIMAT)	394	0.5	▼0.4	0	0
Other	1,011	1.3	▼0.2	0	0
Valid votes	77,904	100.0			
Invalid ballots	1,355	1.7			
Total ballots	27,235	100.0		43	±0
Electorate/voter turnout	48,192	56.5	▲6.8		
Source: City of Stralsund

== Twin towns – sister cities ==
Stralsund is twinned with:

- Huangshan, China
- Kiel, Germany
- Malmö, Sweden
- Pori, Finland
- Stargard, Poland
- Svendborg, Denmark
- Trelleborg, Sweden
- Ventspils, Latvia

== Sport ==
=== Association football ===
FC Pommern Stralsund were a football team that existed from 1994 to 2018. They were the successor to ASG Vorwärts Stralsund.

=== Motorcycle speedway ===
The Paul Greifzu Stadium built in 1957, off the Barther Straße, hosts the speedway team MC Nordstern Stralsund e.V. The team based at the stadium won the German Team Speedway Championship in 2015 and 2022.

== Notable people ==
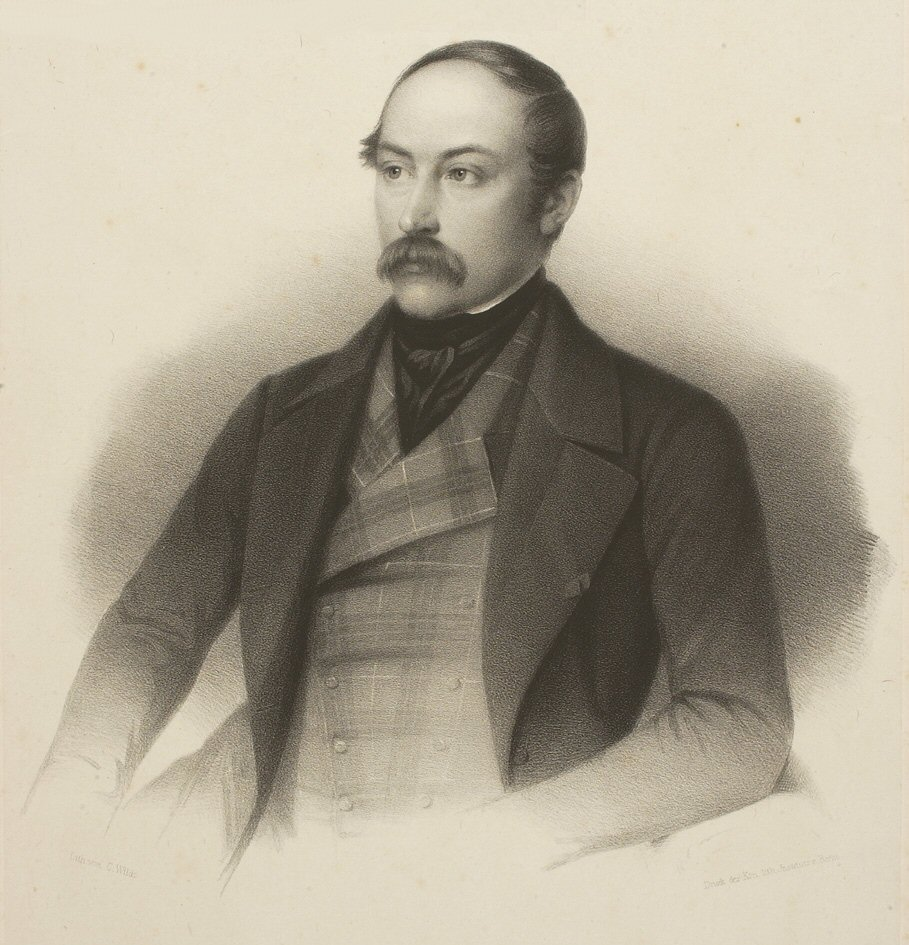
Adolf Heinrich von Arnim-Boitzenburg, pre-1868

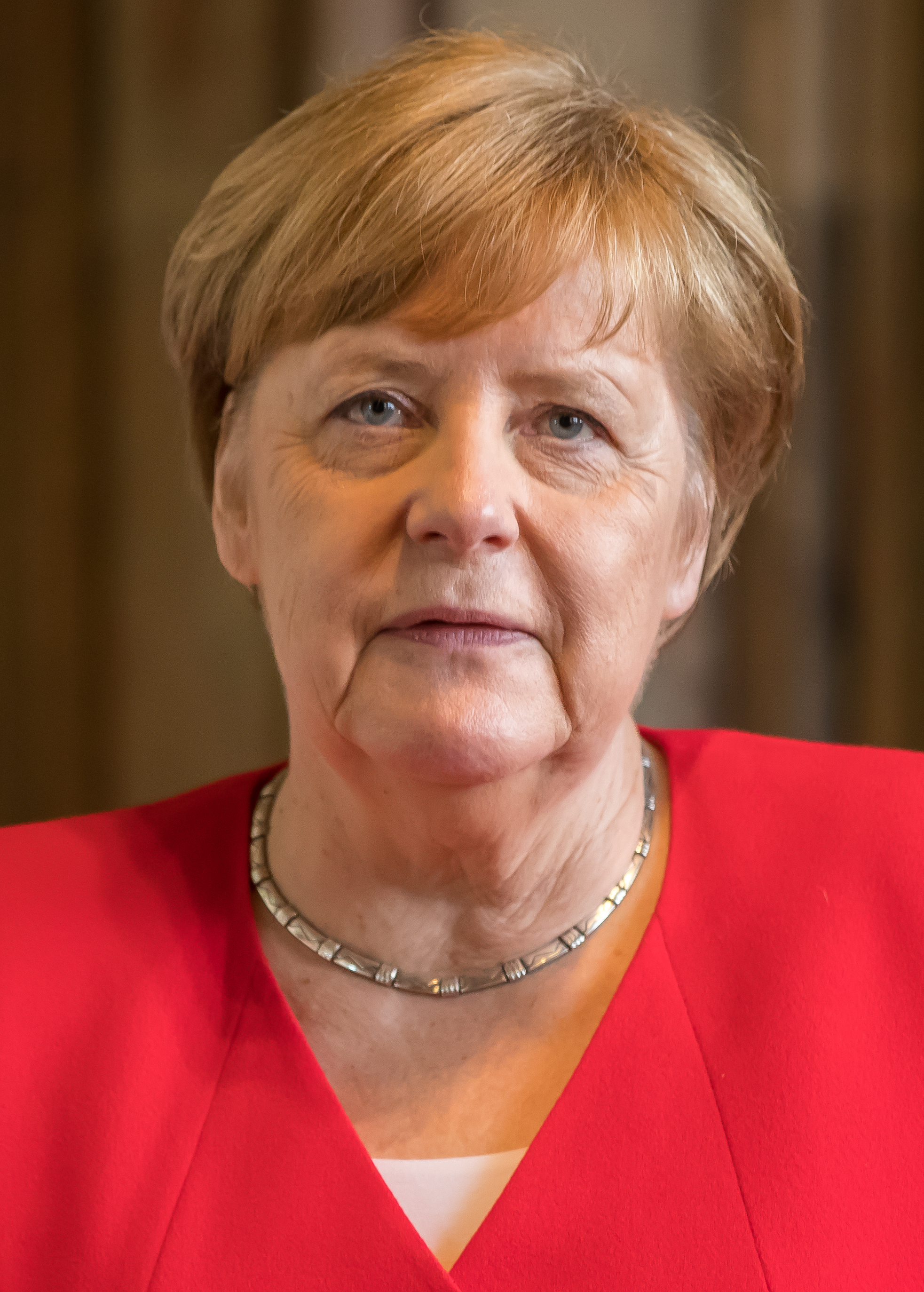
Angela Merkel, 2019

=== Public service and commerce ===
- Thomas Kantzow (c.1505–1542), chronicler of the Duchy of Pomerania
- Bartholomäus Sastrow (1520–1603), official, notary and mayor of Stralsund
- Nicodemus Tessin the Elder (1615–1681), Swedish architect
- Carl Gustav Rehnskiöld (1651–1722), Swedish Field marshal
- Philip Johan von Strahlenberg (1676–1747), Swedish officer and geographer
- Count Johan August Meijerfeldt the Younger (1725–1800), a Swedish field marshal.
- Ernst Moritz Arndt (1769–1860), nationalist author, poet, fighter against serfdom.
- Ferdinand von Schill (1776–1809), leader of a revolt against French domination.
- Carl Georg Schwing (1778–1858), jurist and mayor of Stralsund
- Georg Friedrich Schömann (1793–1879), classical scholar.
- Arnold Ruge (1802–1880), philosopher and political writer.
- Adolf Heinrich von Arnim-Boitzenburg (1803–1868), Prime minister of Prussia
- Hermann von Mallinckrodt (1821–1874), parliamentarian from the Province of Westphalia
- Eduard von Jachmann (1822–1887), vice admiral of the Prussian Navy
- Erich Haupt (1841–1910), Lutheran theologian.
- Leonhard Tietz (1849–1914), merchant, opened his first department store in Stralsund in 1879
- Georg Wertheim (1857–1939), merchant, founded the Wertheim chain of department stores
- Johannes Kromayer (1859–1934), classical historian
- Wolfram Setz (1941–2023), historian, editor and translator
- Angela Merkel (born 1954), politician; her office is still located on the main shopping street
- Dietmar Bartsch (born 1958), politician, member of the Bundestag

=== Science ===
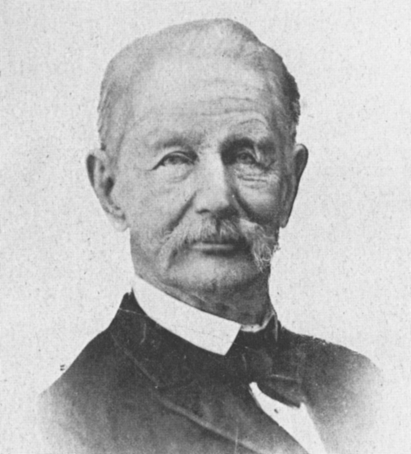
Harmann Burmeister, c. 1885

- Carl Wilhelm Scheele (1742–1786), Swedish Pomeranian / German pharmaceutical chemist.
- Christian Ehrenfried Weigel (1748–1831), scientist
- Hermann Burmeister (1807–1892), German-Argentine zoologist, entomologist and botanist
- William Lindley (1808–1900), engineer, designed water and sewerage systems
- Wilhelm Ferdinand Erichson (1809–1848), medical doctor and entomologist
- Otto Gottlieb Mohnike (1814–1887), physician and naturalist
- Gustav Karl Wilhelm Hermann Karsten (1817–1908), botanist and geologist
- Ernst Kromayer (1862–1933), dermatologist and inventor
- Karl Grunberg (1875–1932), otologist

=== The Arts ===
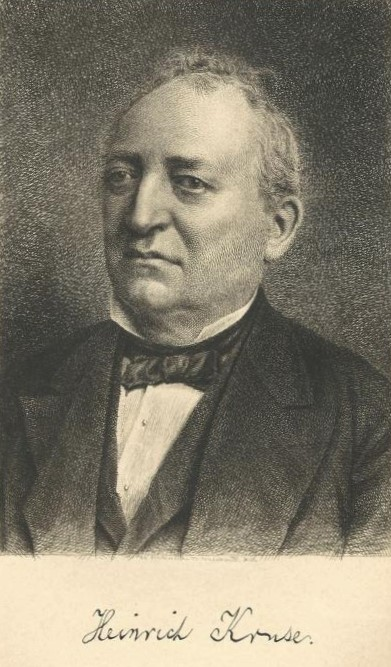
Heinrich Kruse, 1890

- Hermann Raupach (1728–1778), composer
- Paul Struck (1776–1820), composer
- Joachim Nicolas Eggert (1779–1813), Swedish composer and musical director
- Joachim Daniel Andreas Müller (1812–1857), Swedish gardener and writer
- Heinrich Kruse (1815–1902), dramatist, publicist and playwright
- Friedrich Spielhagen (1829–1911), novelist, literary theorist and translator.
- Hermann Carl Hempel (1848–1921), landscape painter
- Hans-Heinz Dräger (1909–1963), German-American musicologist
- Harry Kupfer (1935–2019), opera director, worked at the Stralsund Theatre 1958–1962
- Nadja Uhl (born 1972), actress

=== Sport ===
- Olaf von Schilling (born 1943), swimmer
- Helmut Losch (1947–2005), weightlifter, bronze medallist at the 1976 Summer Olympics
- Jürgen Heuser (born 1953), weightlifter, silver medallist at the 1980 Summer Olympics
- Monika Kallies (born 1956), rower, gold medallist at the 1976 Summer Olympics
- Silke Möller (born 1964), athlete, team bronze medallist at the 1988 Summer Olympics
- Carsten Embach (born 1968), bobsledder, team gold medallist at the 2002 Winter Olympics
- Ulrike Maisch (born 1977), long-distance runner
- Eric Koreng (born 1981), beach volleyball player
- Ariel Hukporti (born 2002), basketball player

== Gallery ==
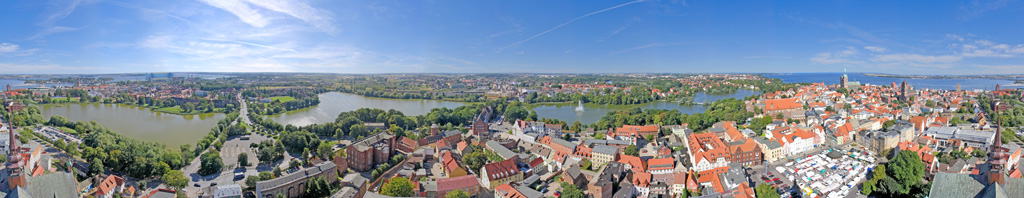
Stralsund panorama
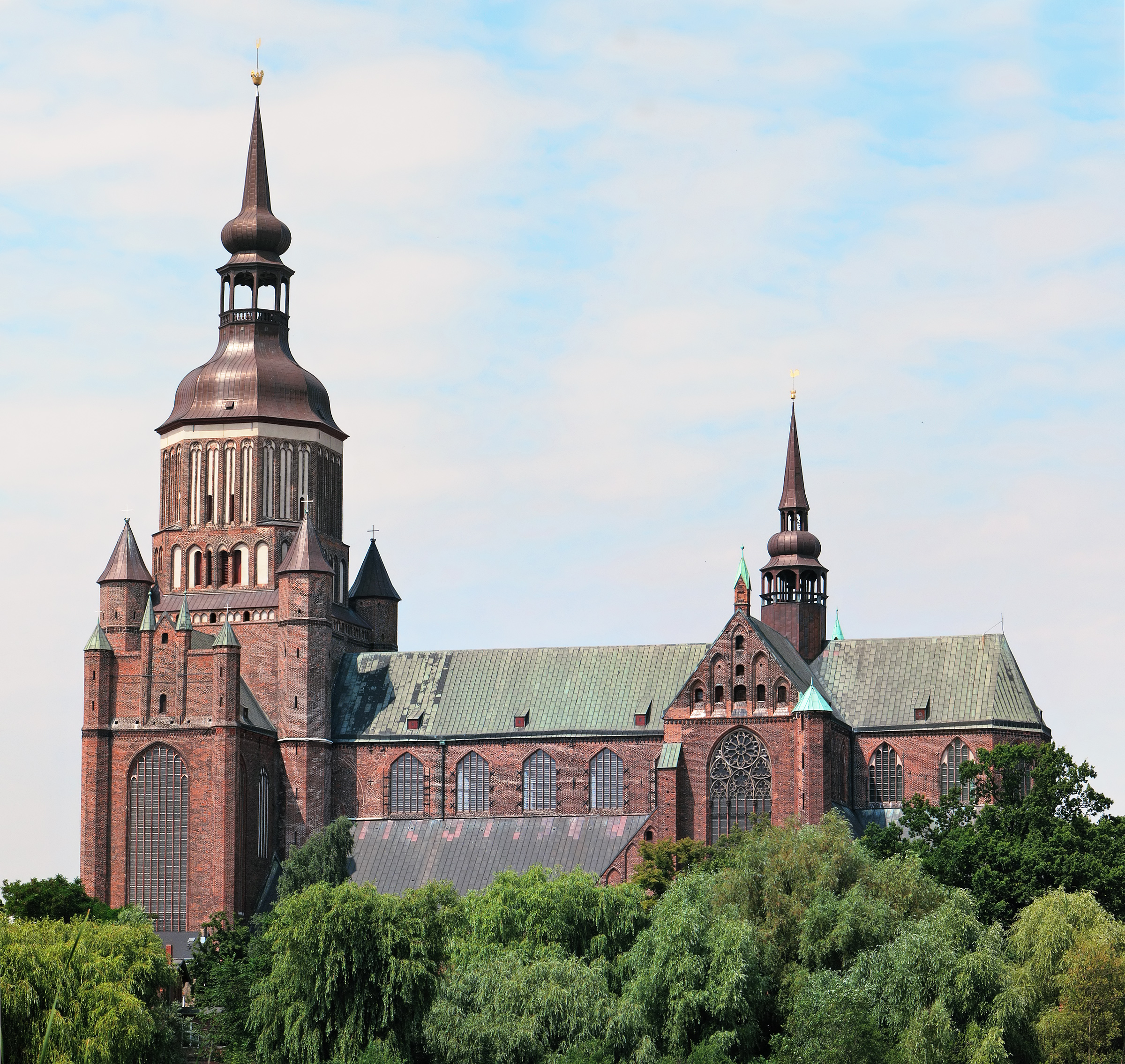
St. Mary's Church

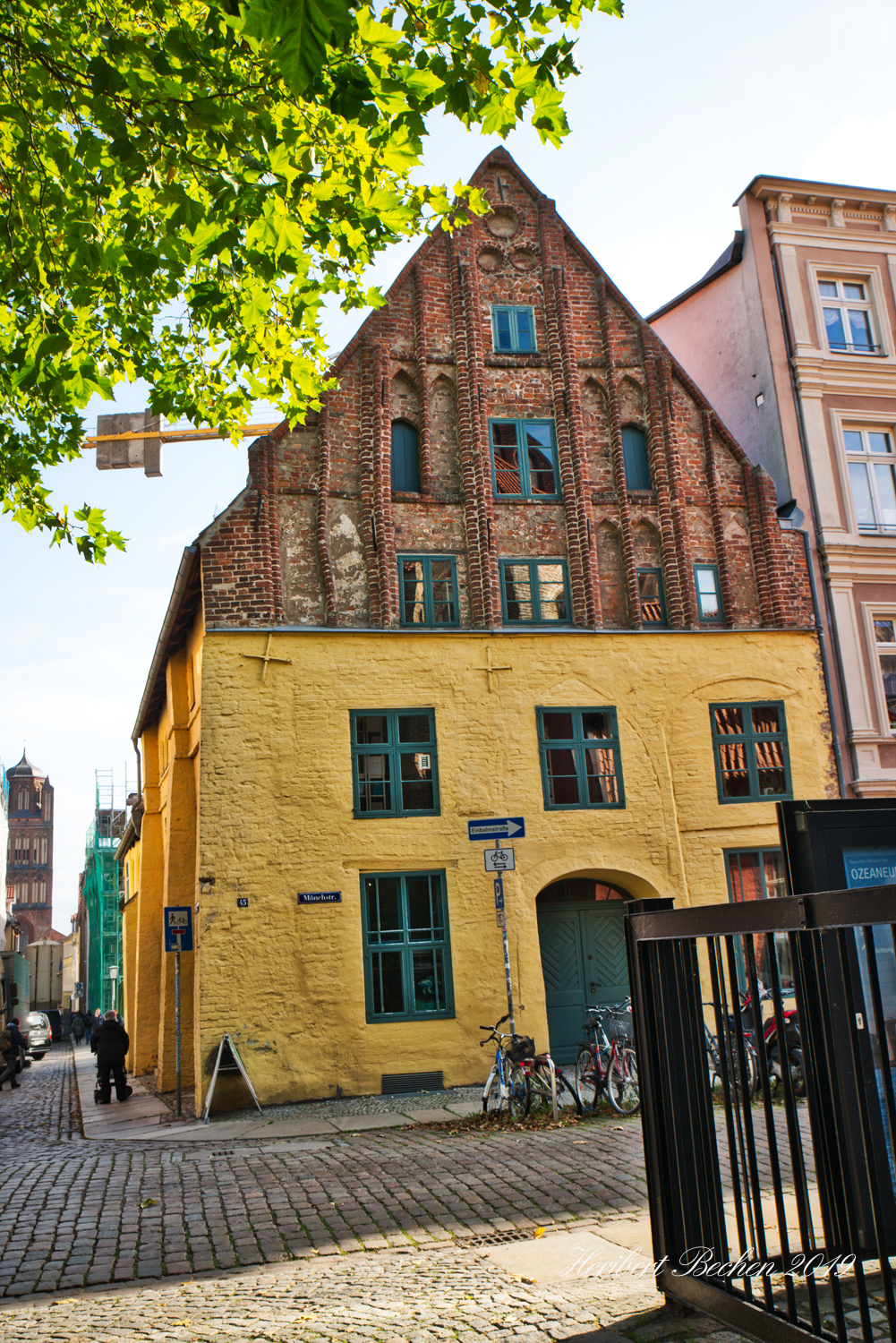
Stralsund

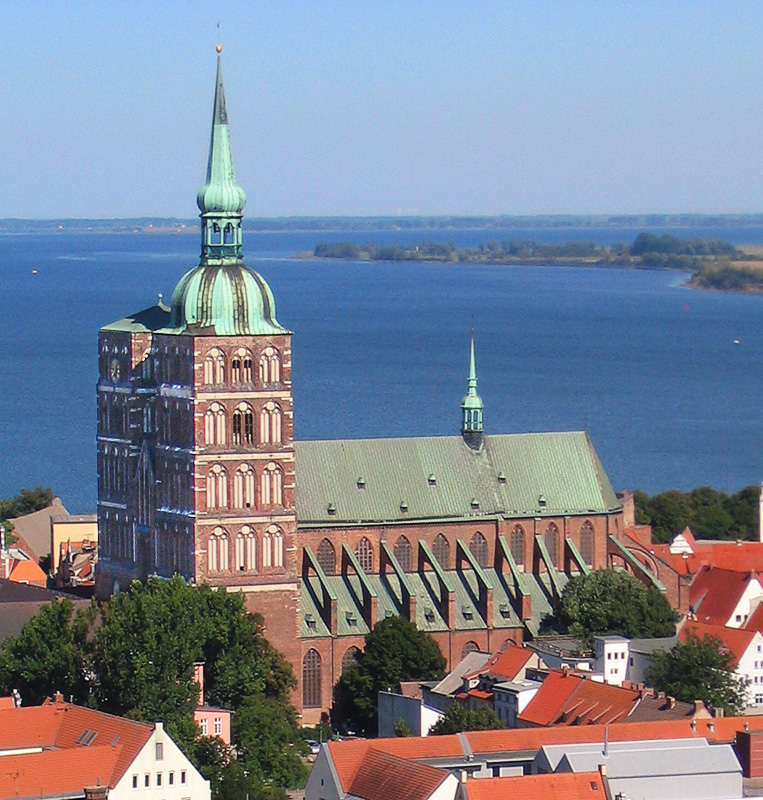
St. Nicolas Church

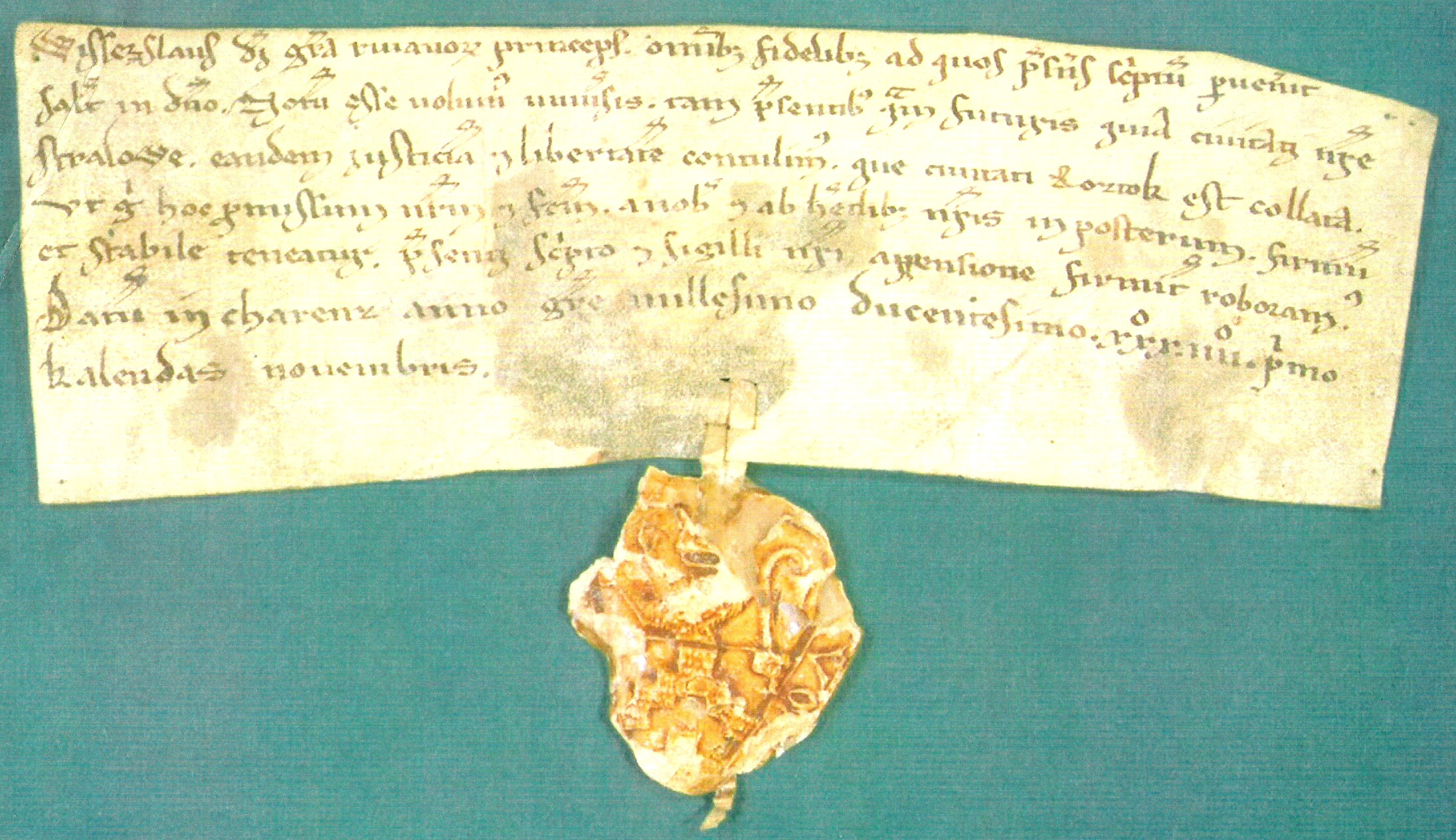
Founding document from 1234

== See also ==
- Stralsunder Highflier

== Literature ==
- Gustav Kratz: Die Städte der Provinz Pommern – Abriss ihrer Geschichte, zumeist nach Urkunden. Berlin 1865, pp. 434–502 ( Volltext)
- Auerbach, Horst: Festung und Marinegarnison Stralsund. Hinstorff-Verlag, Rostock 1999, ISBN 3-356-00835-8.
- Detlev Brunner: Stralsund – Eine Stadt im Systemwandel vom Ende des Kaiserreichs bis in die 1960er Jahre. Veröffentlichungen zur SBZ-/DDR-Forschung im Institut für Zeitgeschichte. München 2010, ISBN 978-3-486-59805-6. (Rezension)
- Hansestadt Stralsund, Untere Denkmalschutzbehörde (ed.): Denkmalplan Stralsund. Recherchen und Analysen für die Pflege des Welterbes. Thomas Helms Verlag, Schwerin 2013. ISBN 978-3-940207-91-3.
