= Darßer Ort Natureum =

Museum in Germany

Coordinates: 54°28′22″N 12°30′10″E

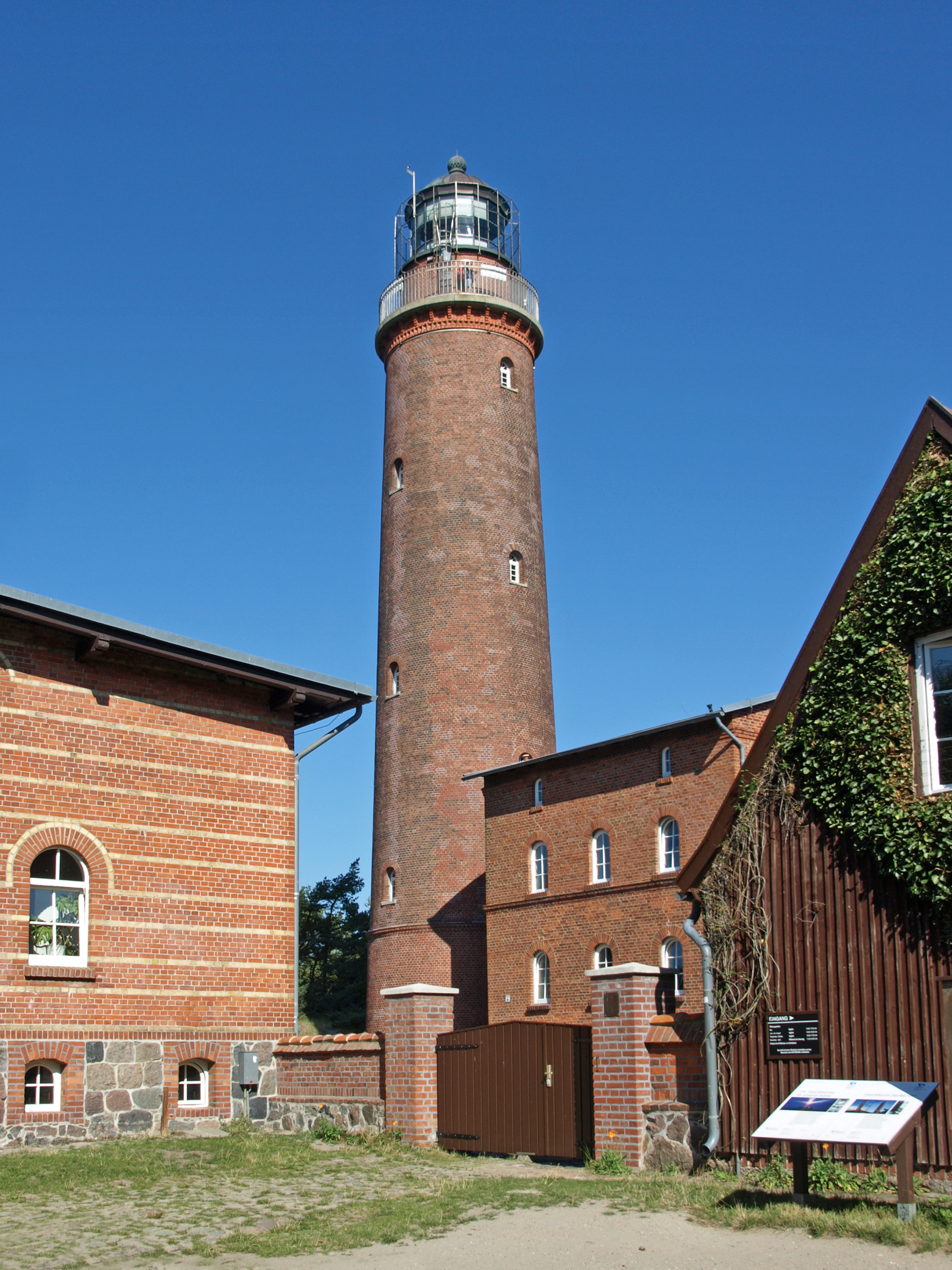
The Natureum at Darß with its lighthouse

Darßer Ort Natureum

The Darßer Ort Natureum (German: Natureum Darßer Ort) is a satellite of the German Oceanographic Museum at Stralsund that was opened in 1991 at Darßer Ort, the northern point of the Darß on Germany's Baltic Sea coast. The Natureum is located about five kilometres northwest of Prerow and c. 8 km north of Born, in the middle of the Western Pomerania Lagoon Area National Park. It can only be reached on foot, by bicycle or by horse and carriage (on request there is also a bus).

The focus of the establishment is the nature and landscape of the Darß peninsula. Many stuffed animals (from porpoise, seal, eider duck and lumpfish to beach crab and mussel), a Baltic Sea aquarium with fish and invertebrates of the Baltic Sea portray the variety of animals in the surrounding area.

The Natureum has six permanent exhibitions:

1. Darßer Ort Natural Region,
2. Animals of the Darß Landscape,
3. Baltic Sea Coast,
4. Landscape in Motion,
5. Lighthouse History and
6. the Open Air Site.

From the 150-year-old, 35-metre-high Darßer Ort Lighthouse there are views far and wide over the bodden landscape.

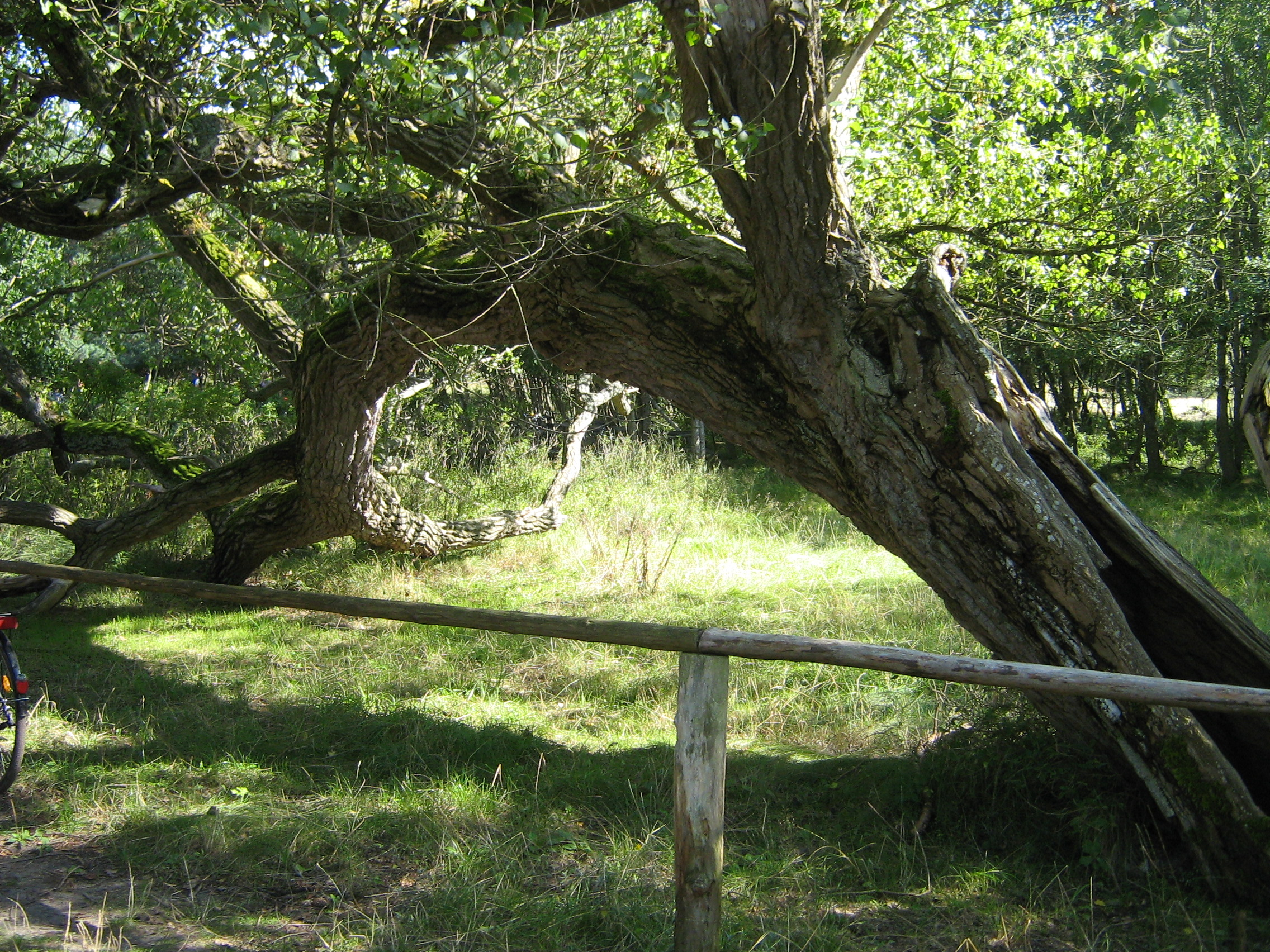
Crooked tree at the Natureum

From its foundation in 1991 to the year 2004, the Natureum had more than 1.7 million visitors.
