= St. Mary's Church, Stralsund =

Saint Mary's Church
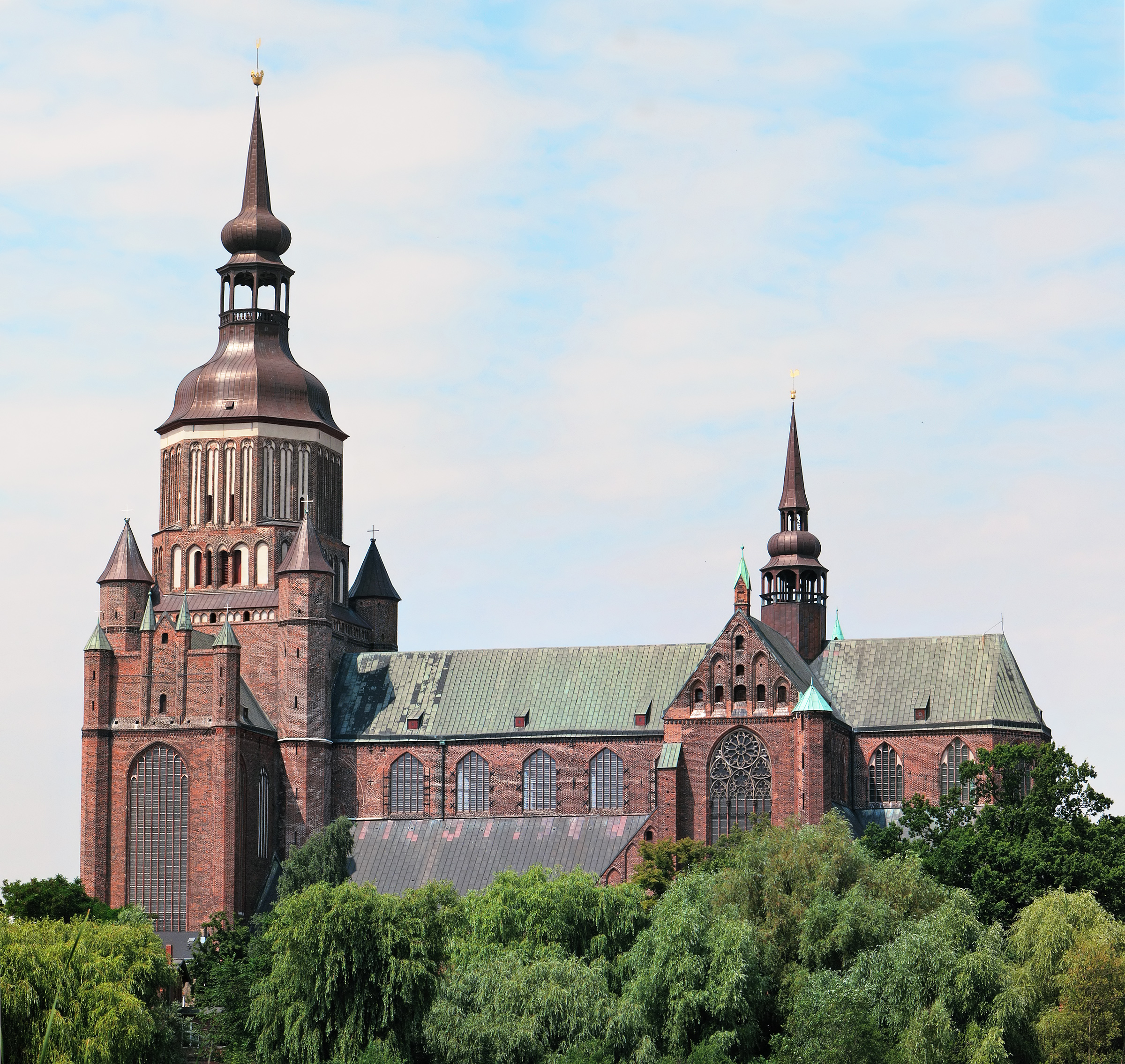

Record height
- Tallest in the world from 1548 to 1647^{[I]}
- Preceded by: Lincoln Cathedral
- Surpassed by: Strasbourg Cathedral

General information
- Location: Stralsund, Germany
- Coordinates: 54°18′37″N 13°05′16″E
- Completed: before 1298

Height
- Antenna spire: currently 104 m (341 ft)

St. Mary's Church (German: Marienkirche) is a large Lutheran church located in Stralsund, northern Germany. It was built sometime before 1380 and showcases remarkable Gothic architecture, serving as an outstanding example of the prevalent Brick Gothic style in northern Germany and the Baltic states. Standing at 151 metres (495 ft) tall, it held the title of the world's tallest building between 1548 and 1647, with the exception of the period between 1569 and 1573 when the tower of St. Pierres Cathedral in Beauvais was completed and subsequently collapsed. Recognized as part of the historic center of Stralsund, the church was inscribed on the UNESCO World Heritage List in 2002.

The bell tower collapsed in 1382, and was rebuilt by 1478. In 1495, the steeple tower blew down during a severe storm, and was then rebuilt taller. This was subsequently struck by lightning in 1647, and burned down, and was rebuilt as a baroque dome, which, completed in 1708, can be seen today. The tower is currently 104 metres (341 ft) tall.

The main organ built by Friedrich Stellwagen between 1653 and 1659 is one of the famous large baroque organs in Europe.

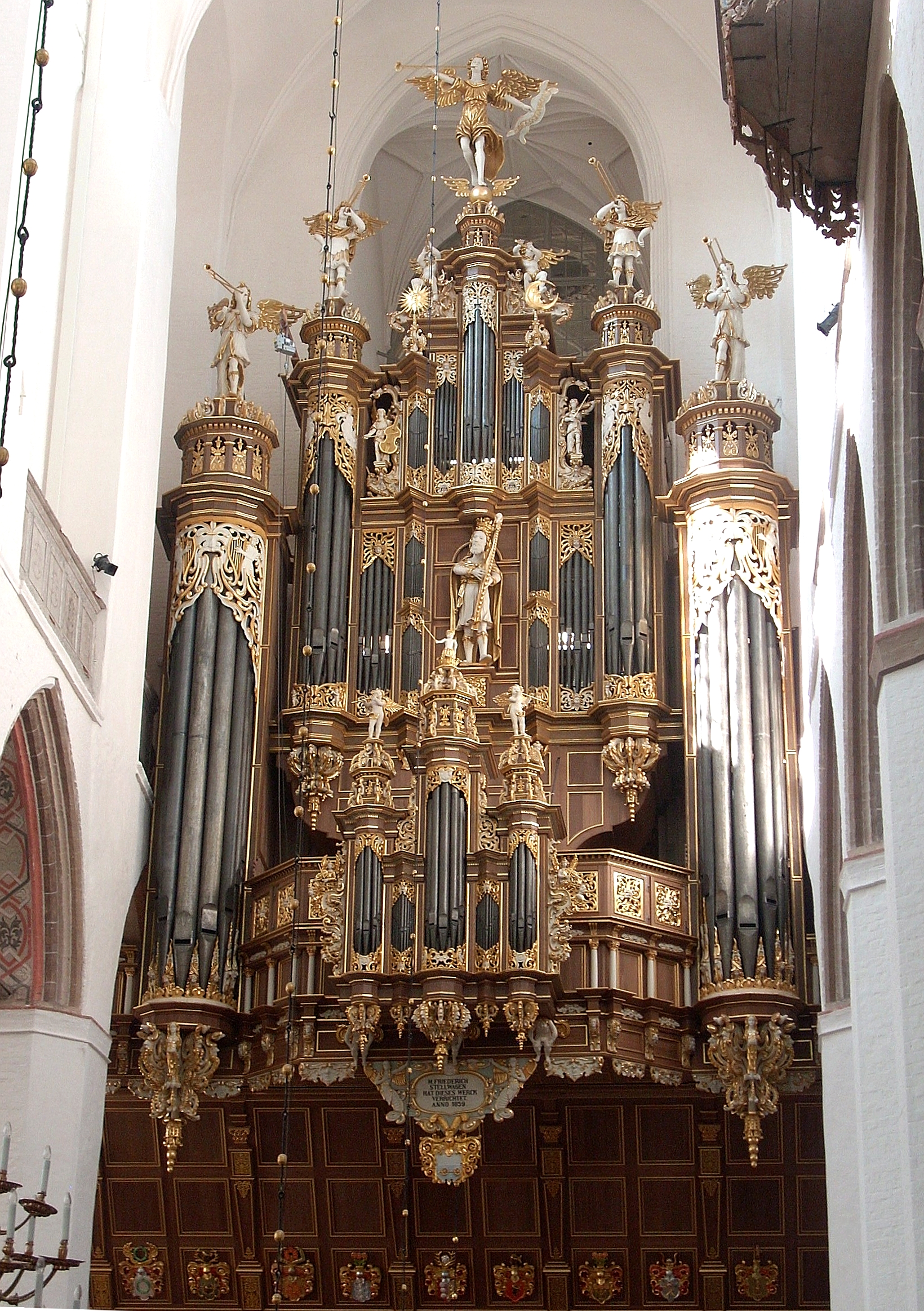
The famous Stellwagen-Organ from 1659

== See also ==
- List of tallest structures built before the 20th century

Records
Preceded by Lincoln Cathedral	World's tallest structure 1548-1569; 151 m	Succeeded by Beauvais Cathedral
Preceded by Beauvais Cathedral	World's tallest structure 1573-1647; 151 m	Succeeded by Strasbourg Cathedral
