= Karl Grünberg (otologist) =

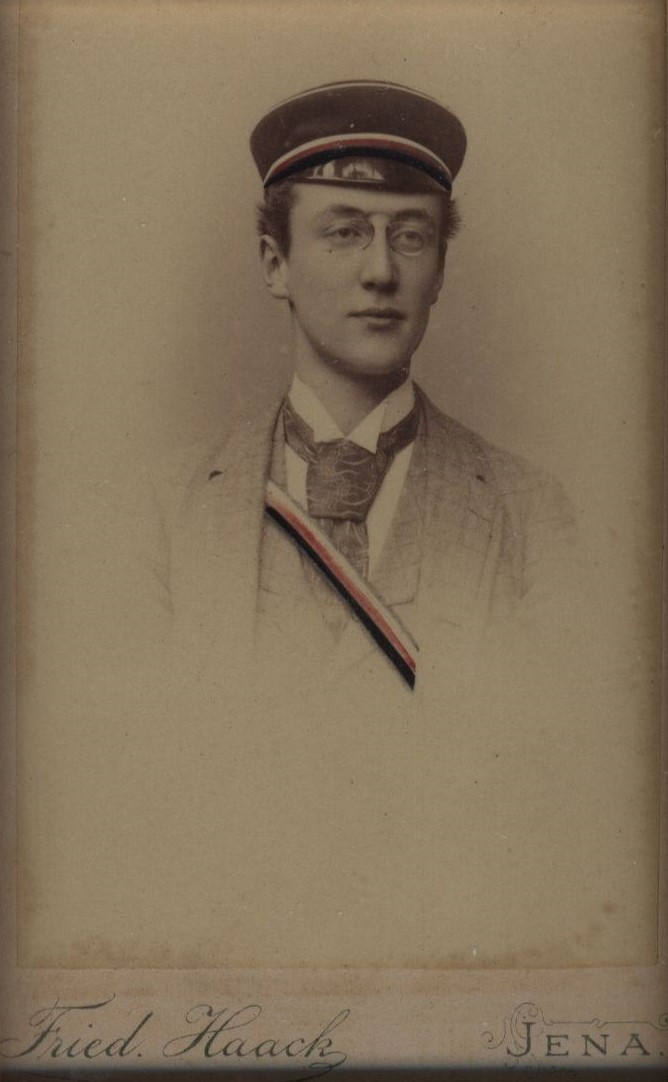
Karl Grünberg

Karl Heinrich Grünberg (16 July 1875 in Stralsund – 25 November 1932 in Bonn) was a German otorhinolaryngologist, known for his research on the pathological anatomy of the ear's labyrinth.

He studied medicine at several German universities, receiving his doctorate in Greifswald in 1897 with the dissertation-thesis Fälle von perforierendem Sarkom des Schädels ("Two cases of perforating sarcoma of the skull"). In 1908 he obtained his habilitation for otology, rhinology and laryngology at the University of Rostock, where he later became an associate professor. From 1924 to 1932 he was a full professor of otorhinolaryngology at the University of Bonn.

== Published works ==
- Beiträge zur Kenntnis der Labyrintherkrankungen, 1908 – Contributions to the knowledge of labyrinth disorders.
- Handbuch der pathologischen anatomie des menschlichen ohres (1917; with Wilhelm Lange-Eichbaum, Paul Manasse) – Handbook on the pathological anatomy of the human ear.
- Die otitischen Erkrankungen des Hirns, der Hirnhäute und der Blutleiter (5th edition, 1925; with Otto Körner) – Otitic diseases of the brain, meninges and sinuses.
- Lehrbuch der Ohren-, Nasen- und Kehlkopf-Krankheiten. Nach klinischen Vorträgen für Studierende und Ärzte (12th edition, 1930; with Otto Körner) – Textbook of ear, nose and throat diseases.
