= Loop (inlet) =

Coordinates: 54°22′43″N 12°25′09″E

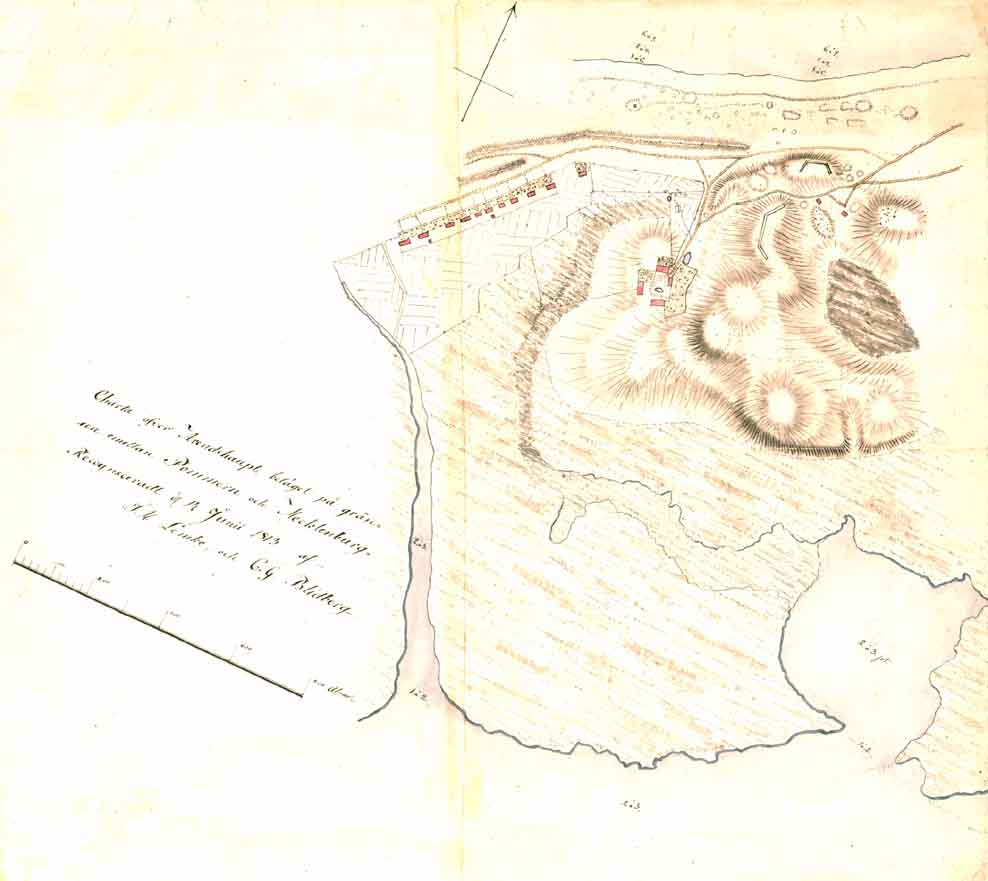
1813 map with parts of the Loop still visible

The Loop (German pronunciation: [loːp]) or Darss Canal (Darßer Kanal) was an inlet of the sea between the lagoon known as the Saaler Bodden and the Baltic Sea near Ahrenshoop on the German coast. It formed the northern boundary of the region of Fischland. Originally the Loop was the northern estuarine branch of the River Recknitz.

The old inlet ran between the present villages of Ahrenshoop and Althagen. The Loop was roughly two metres deep and had posts for mooring boats and barges. Its navigability was frequently curtailed by storms and silting up. Today only a small ditch remains on the former Mecklenburg-Pomeranian border, which runs alongside a main road, the so-called Grenzweg ("border way").

The cartographer and court astronomer at the Mecklenburg court, Tilemann Stella, described the Loop thus: "Between the village of Oldenhagen [Althagen] and the Arnshope [Ahrenshoop], the waters of the Ribnitz river and lake break through into the salty sea. Beyond the beach is a large pile of rock and bricks at the place by the beach; that was the customs post, located 3 or 4 ruthen [50 metres] into the salty sea. Beyond that, forty or fifty posts stood in the salt sea, at the end of which was a large pile of rocks on which the fort stood."

At the end of the 14th century the Pomeranian duke, Barnim VI, wanted to turn Ahrenshoop into a larger trading town in order to benefit from the growth in trade. The then Arneshop was an important trading post with up to 500 inhabitants. To that end, he had the place protected by ditches, border fortifications, customs posts and a fortified redoubt. Its further development failed, however, due to the vulnerability of the Loop to the vagaries of the weather.

The Victual Brothers also used the Loop and the Permin near Wustrow to enter the waters of the bodden, which they used as a refuge between their piratic raids. The Hanseatic city of Rostock, which envisaged its trading privileges being affected by a harbour on the Darß, finally had Ahrenshoop destroyed, after two failed attempts, in 1395 and the Darß Canal filled in.
