= Niehagen =

Coordinates: 54.362659°N 12.409772°E

Niehagen (German pronunciation: [ˈniːhaːɡn̩]) is a village in the municipality of Ahrenshoop on the Fischland-Darß-Zingst peninsula in the German state of Mecklenburg-West Pomerania.

On the steep coast near Althagen/Niehagen lies the Bakelberg knoll. At 18 m above sea level (NHN) it is the highest point of Fischland.

== Notable people ==
The sculptor Gerhard Marcks lived and worked in Niehagen in the 1930s, at Boddenweg 1.

== Gallery ==
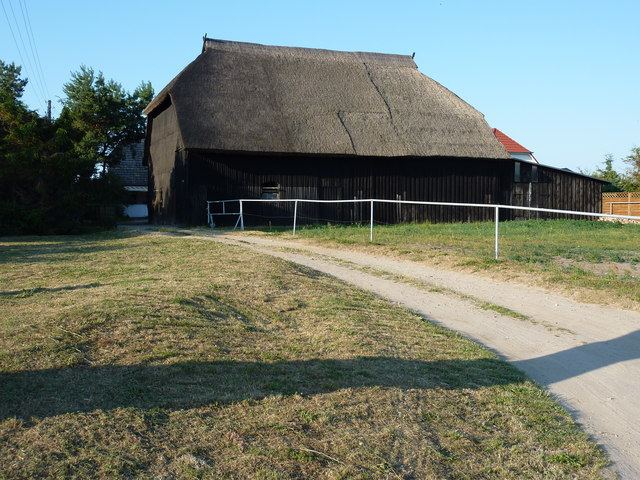
Farm near Niehagen

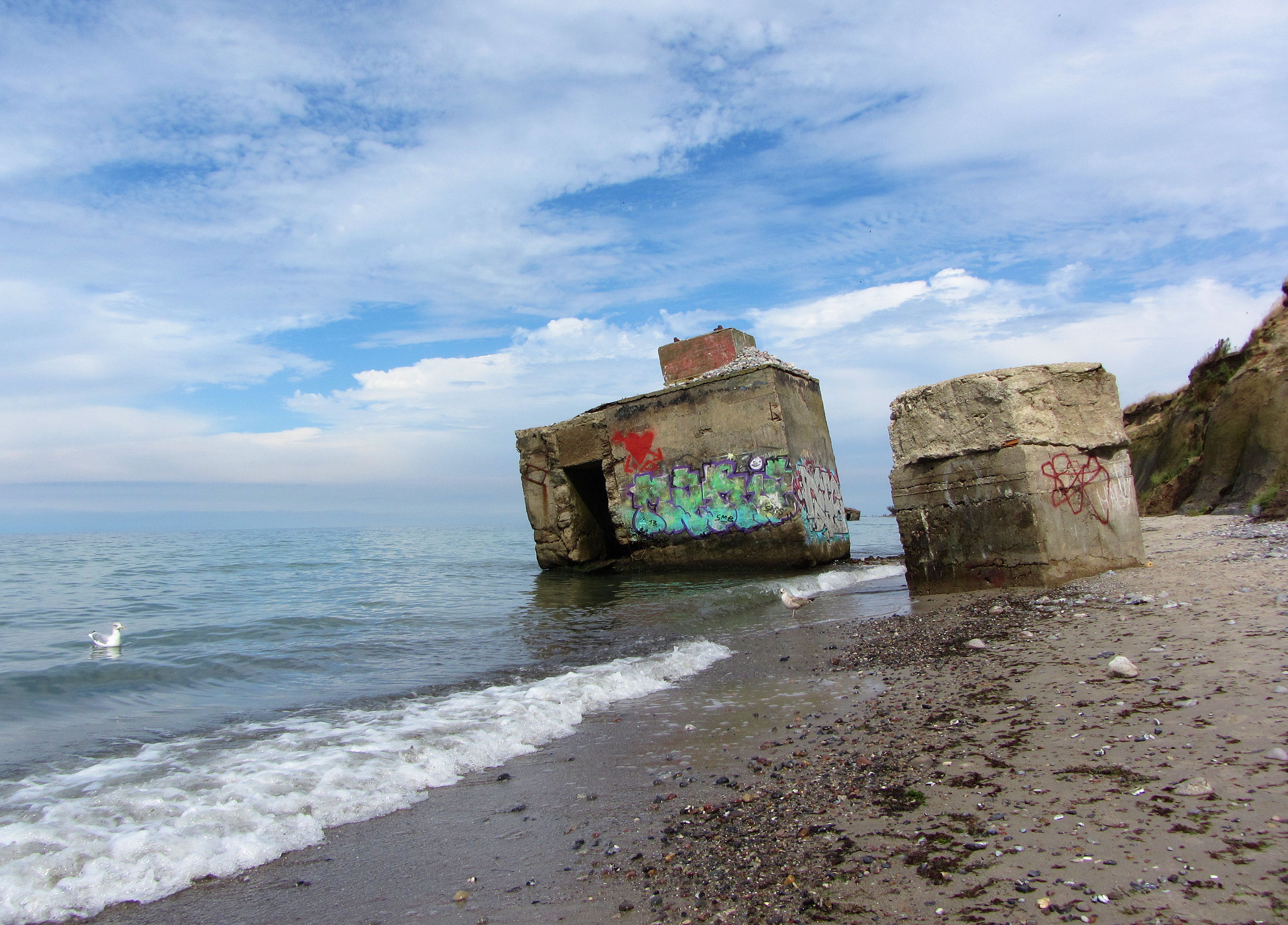
Bunker system exposed by coastal erosion on the Hoher Ufer near Niehagen
