= Permin =

Bay in Germany

Coordinates: 54°20′23″N 12°23′28″E

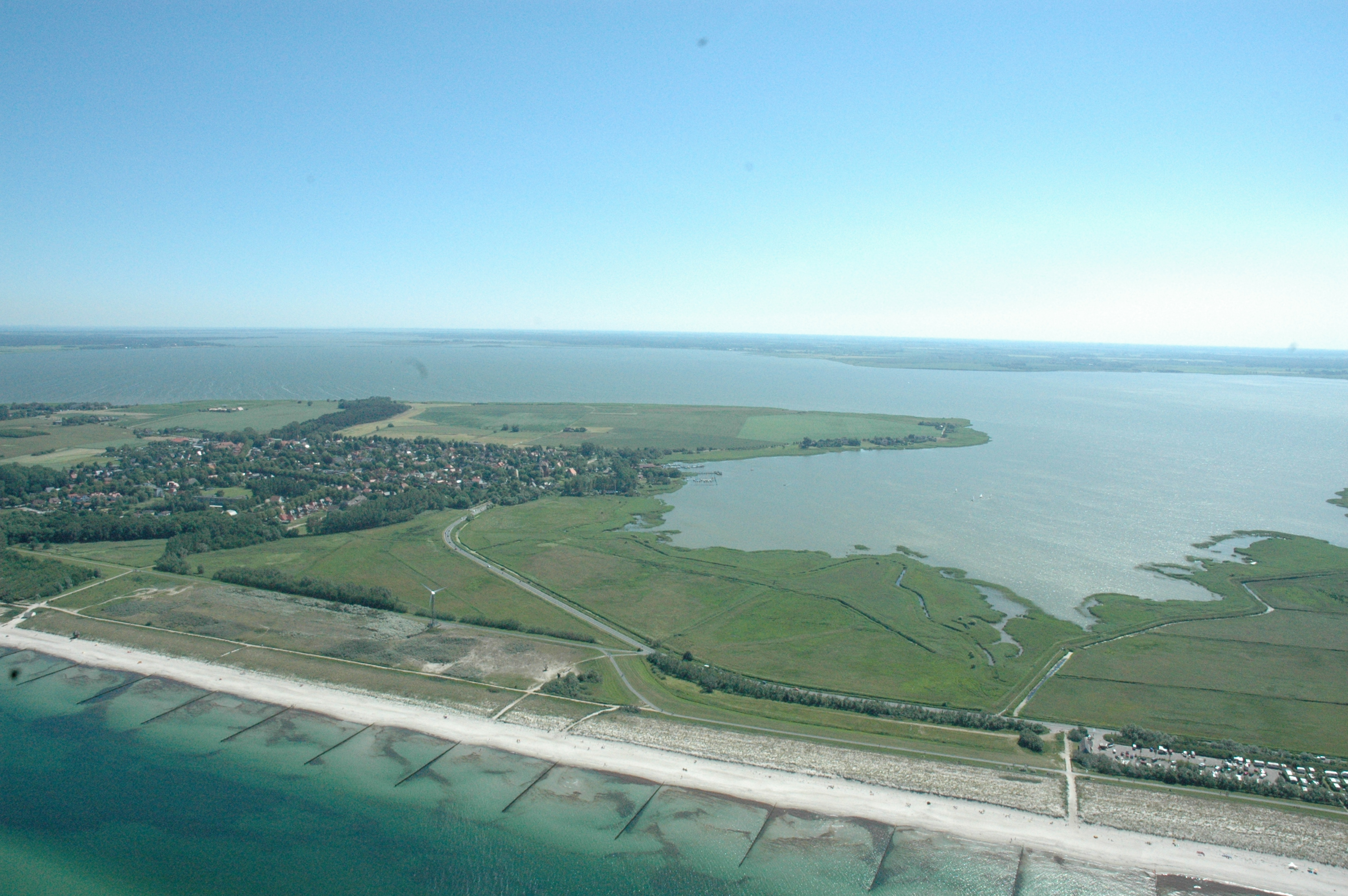
The Bay of Permin from the air

The Permin is a bay in the Saaler Bodden lagoon south of Wustrow in northeast Germany. Originally, the Permin was a channel between the Saaler Bodden and the Baltic Sea and the southern estuarine channel of the River Recknitz. It borders on the Fischland in the south.

Because the Permin was navigable in the 13th and 14th centuries with average water depths of around 2 to 3 metres, it formed an important waterway for trade to and from the towns of Ribnitz and Barth, although its navigability was frequently degraded by storms and silting up. Although the Permin was only suitable for smaller ships and mainly used by the population of the local region to ply their trade in small, open boats, the Hanseatic League believed its trading privileges were being affected. Moreover, at the end of the 14th century, trade in the Baltic was heavily disrupted by the Victual Brothers, who were supported by the Mecklenburg dukes and the Pomeranian Duke Barnim VI from time to time. The Victual Brothers used the Permin and the Loop near Ahrenshoop to enter the waters of the various boddens, which they used as a retreat in between their privateering. In 1392 or 1393 the Hanseatic town of Rostock had the port of Ahrenshoop destroyed and dammed the Loop. In 1400, the Hanseatic town of Stralsund had three ships sunk in the Permin, which accelerated the siltation of the channel and made it unnavigable. So by the turn of the 14th and 15th centuries both links between the bodden and the sea were closed. Whether they were re-opened has not been passed down.

It was not until 1625 that the Loop was torn wide open and deeply by the storm flood; nothing is known about the Permin, but it can be assumed that this even weaker stretch of coast was also significantly affected.

In 1872, a storm flood drove a creek or tidal inlet 15 metres wide and 5 metres deep in the area of the Permin. In order to join the two parts of the mainland on either side, an emergency bridge had to be erected.

Even today this section of coast is classified as severely endangered during floods, which is why coastal protection measures are planned.
