= Althagen =

- Village of Ahrenshoop
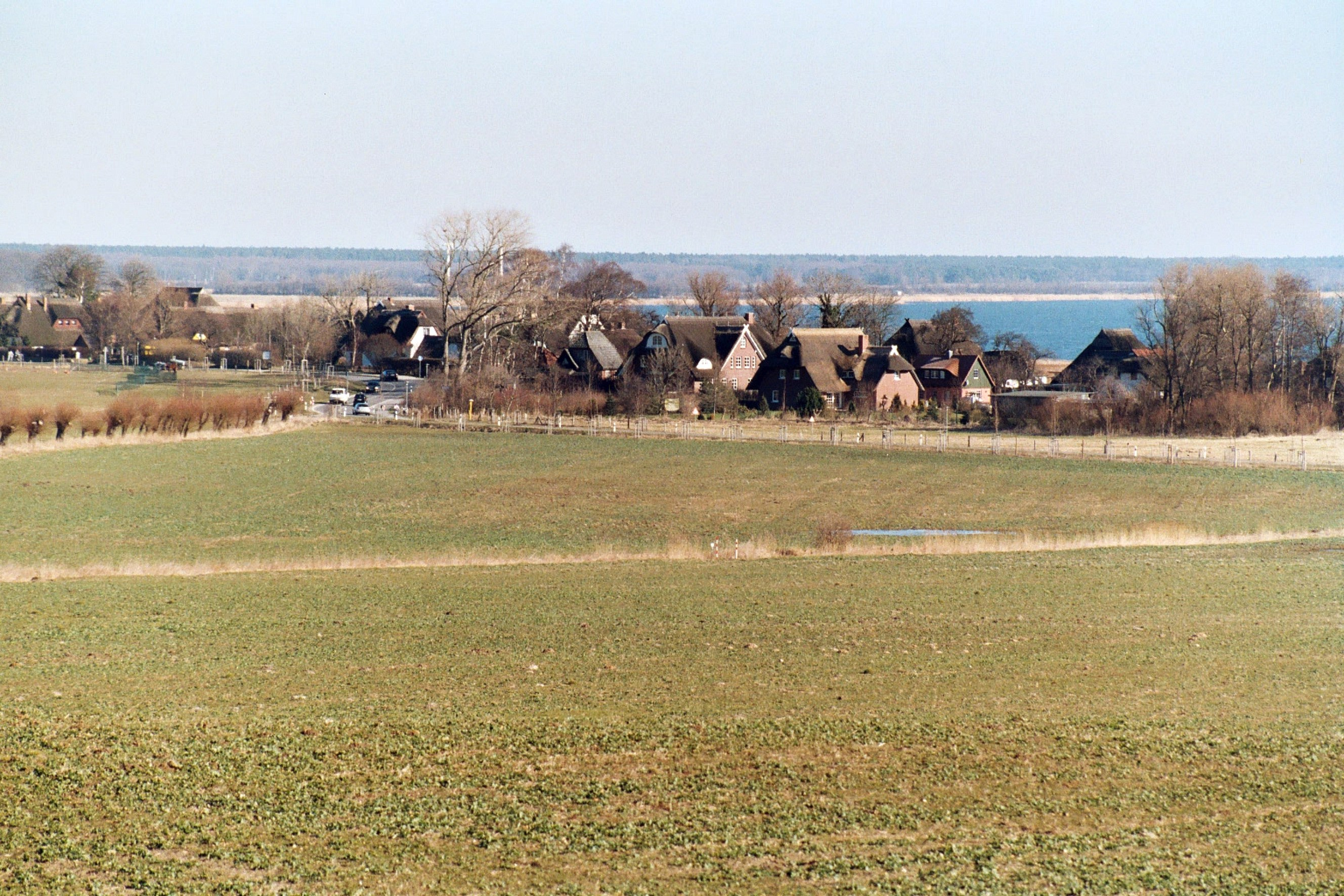
- Althagen as seen from the Bakelberg
- Interactive map of Althagen
- Location within Germany Location within Mecklenburg-Vorpommern
- Country: Germany
- State: Mecklenburg-Vorpommern
- District: Vorpommern-Rügen
- City: Ahrenshoop
- Elevation: 17.9 m (59 ft)
- Time zone: UTC+01:00 (CET)
  - Summer (DST): UTC+02:00 (CEST)
- Postal codes: 18347
- Vehicle registration: VR, NVP

Althagen (German pronunciation: [ˈaltˌhaːɡn̩]) is a village and ortsteil of the municipality Ahrenshoop on the peninsula of Fischland-Darß-Zingst in the German state of Mecklenburg-Vorpommern.

== Geography ==
The Bakelberg knoll lies close to the steep coast of Althagen/Niehagen. At 17.9 metres above sea level, it is the highest point on Fischland. Althagen has a port on the bodden coast.

== History ==
The village has been a part of the municipality of Ahrenshoop since 1950. Until 1945, the border between Mecklenburg and Pomerania ran between Althagen and Ahrenshoop along the border road, Grenzweg.

=== Artist presence ===
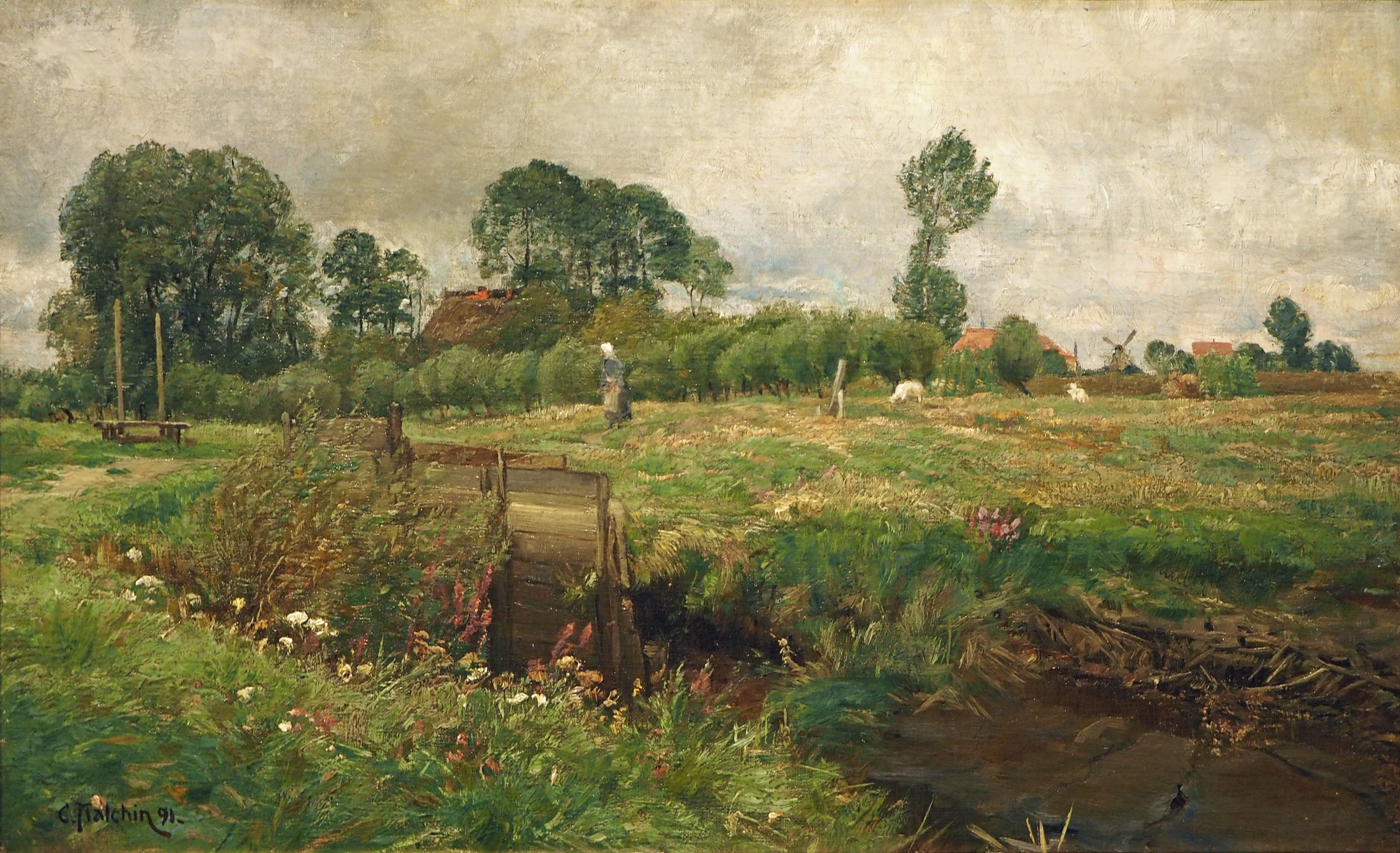
Summer landscape near Althagen by Carl Malchin (1891)

Well known residents of Althagen include the designer, Gertrud Kleinhempel (1875-1948), the writer, Käthe Miethe (1893-1961) and (from 1944) the well-known artist couple Fritz Koch-Gotha (1877-1956) and Dora Koch-Stetter (1881-1968). Koch-Stetter's 1911 expressionist painting, The red house in Althagen, is one of her most famous works to this day.

From 1955, Fischland Pottery (Fischlandkeramik), was developed in their ceramics workshoops by the next generation of the artist family of Koch [-Gotha and -Stetter], artist and potter, Barbara Klünder (1919-1988), and her husband, the artist Arnold Klünder (1909-1976) together with artist, Frida Löber (1910-1989) and the sculptor and potter, Wilhelm Löber (1903-1981).

== Gallery ==
=== Photos ===
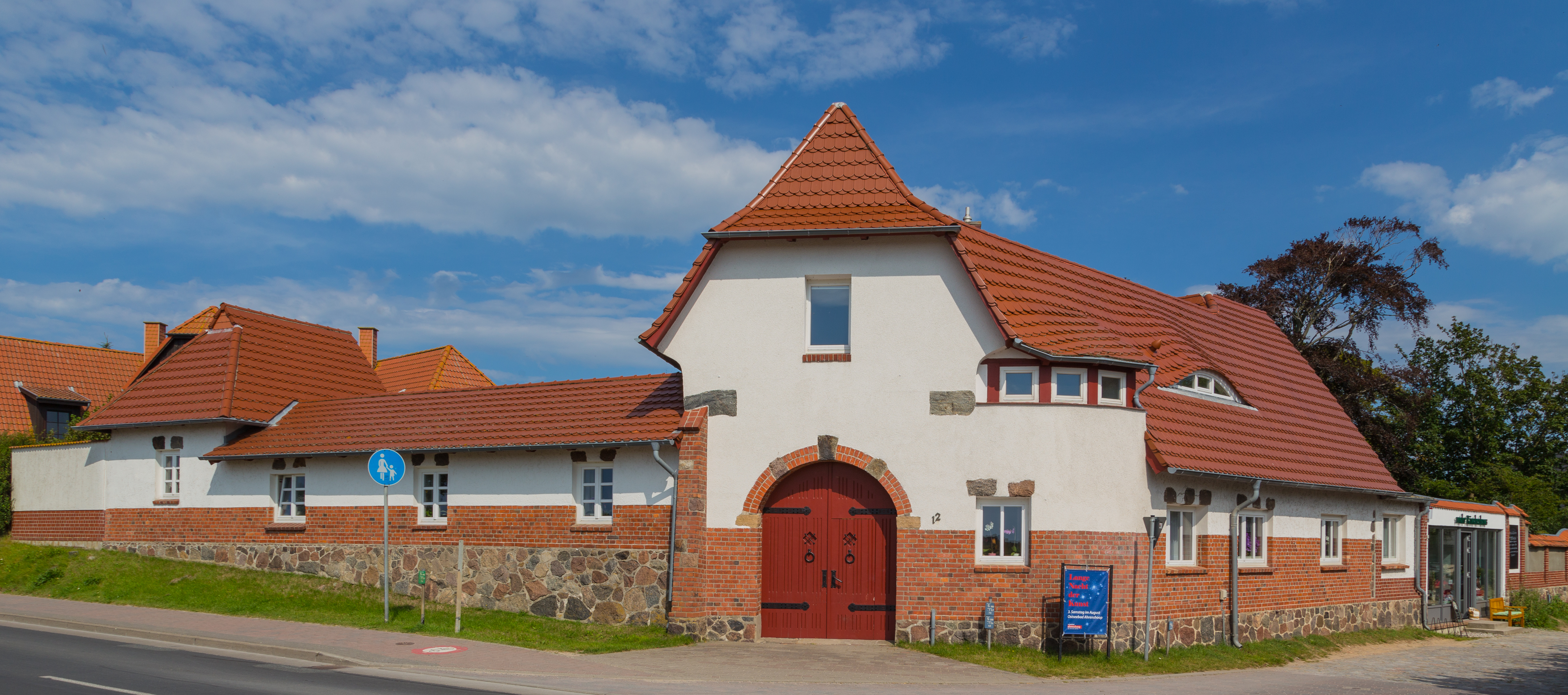
Althaeger Strasse 12

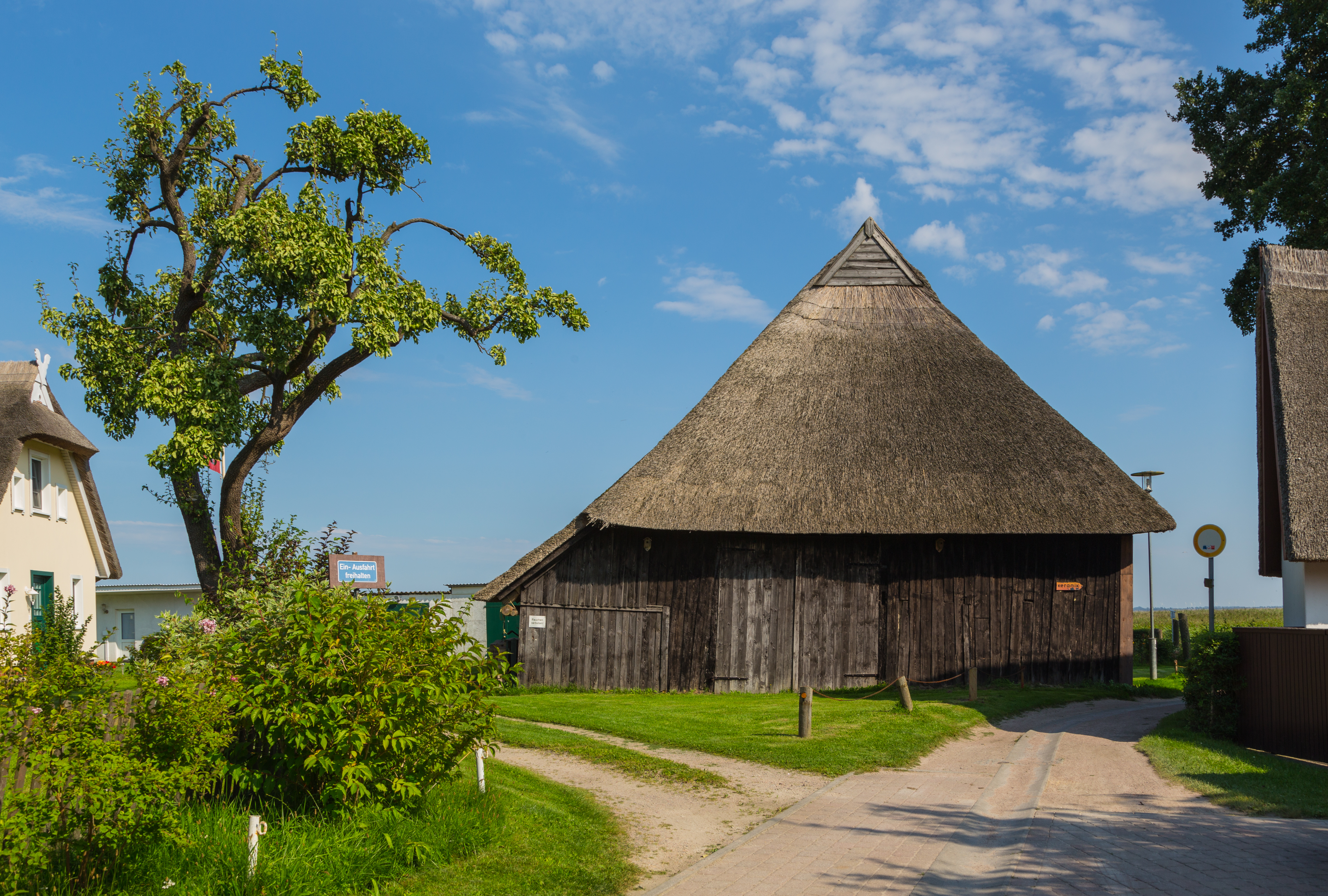
Althaeger Strasse 88

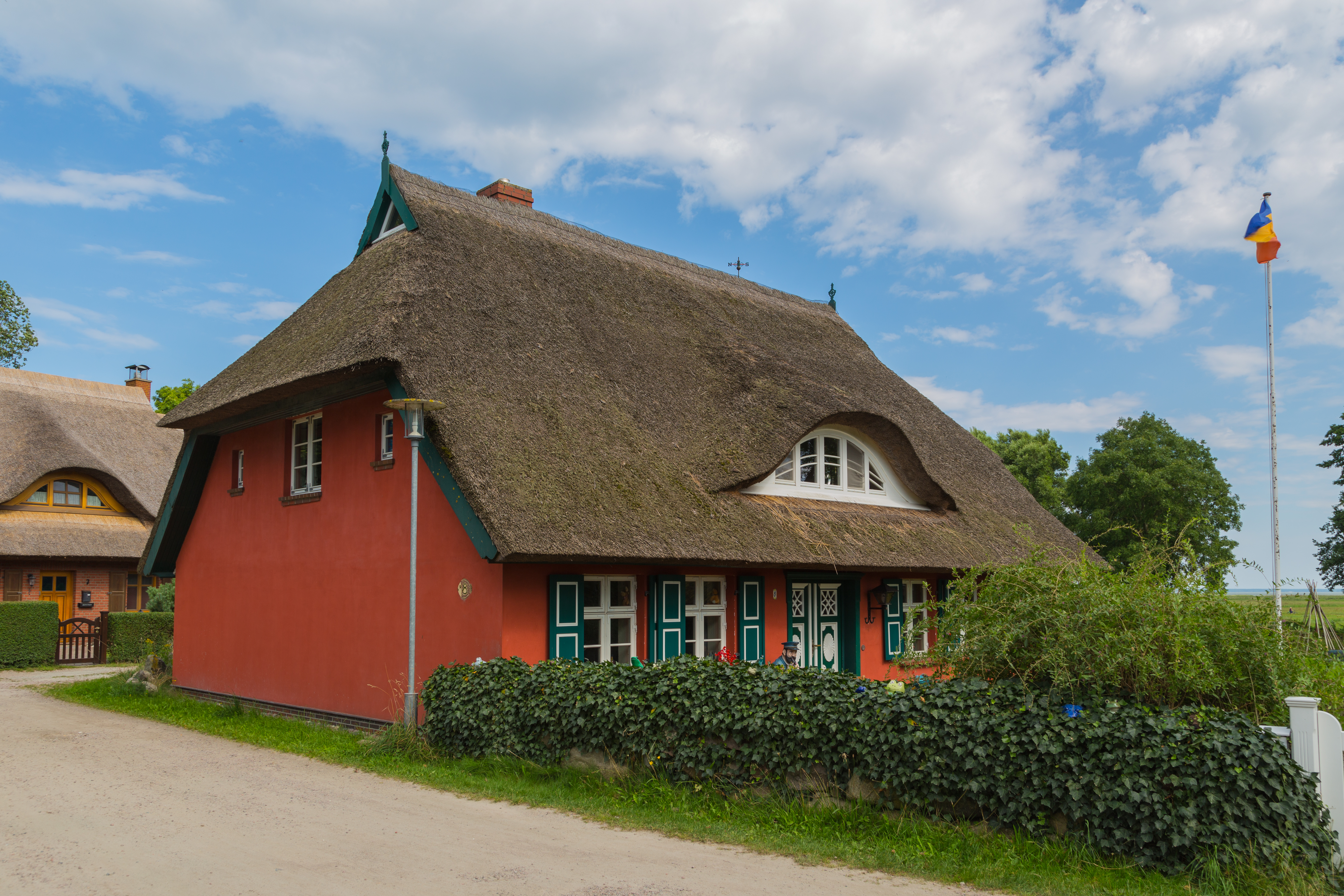
Bernhard Seitz Weg 8

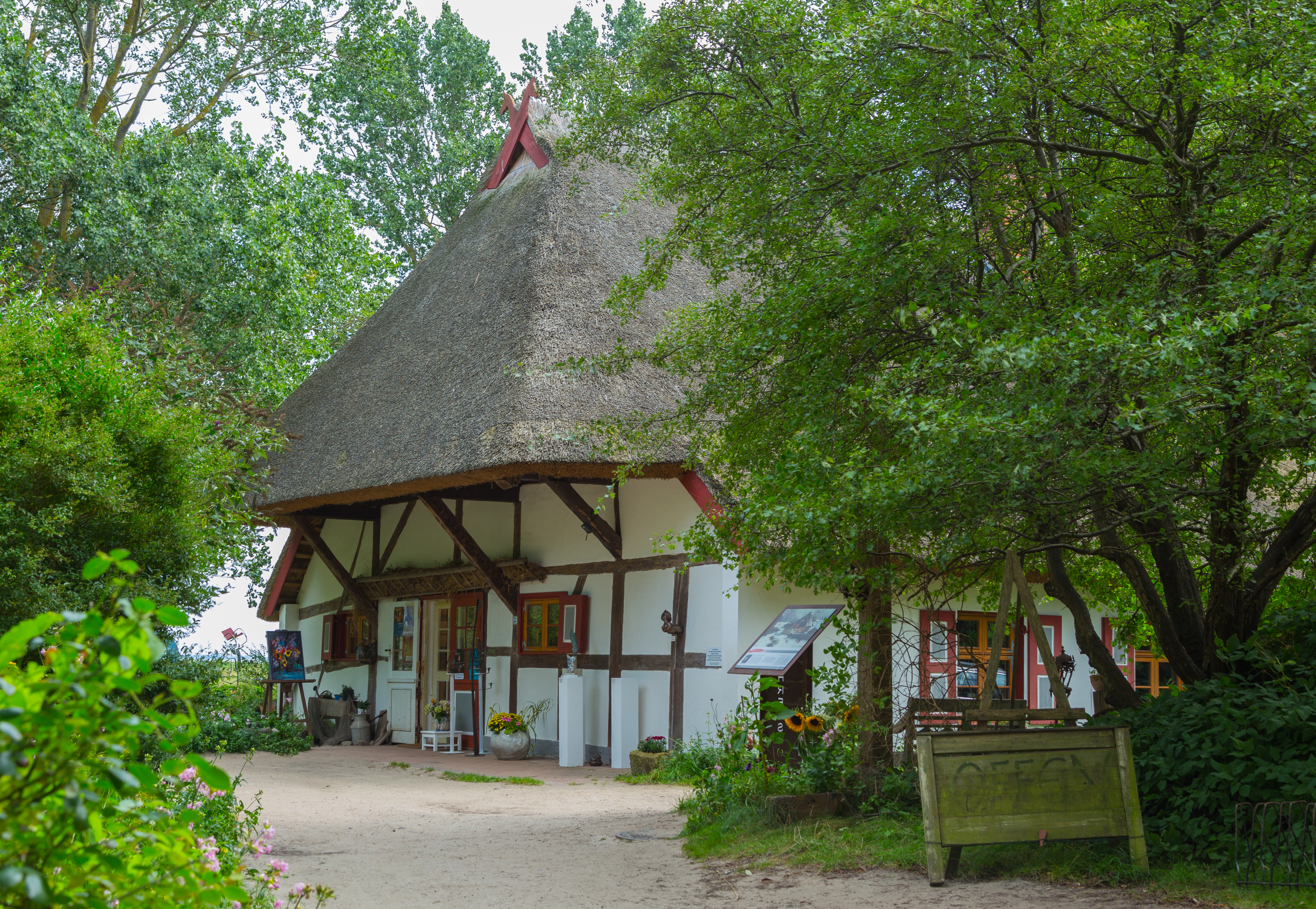
Dornenhaus

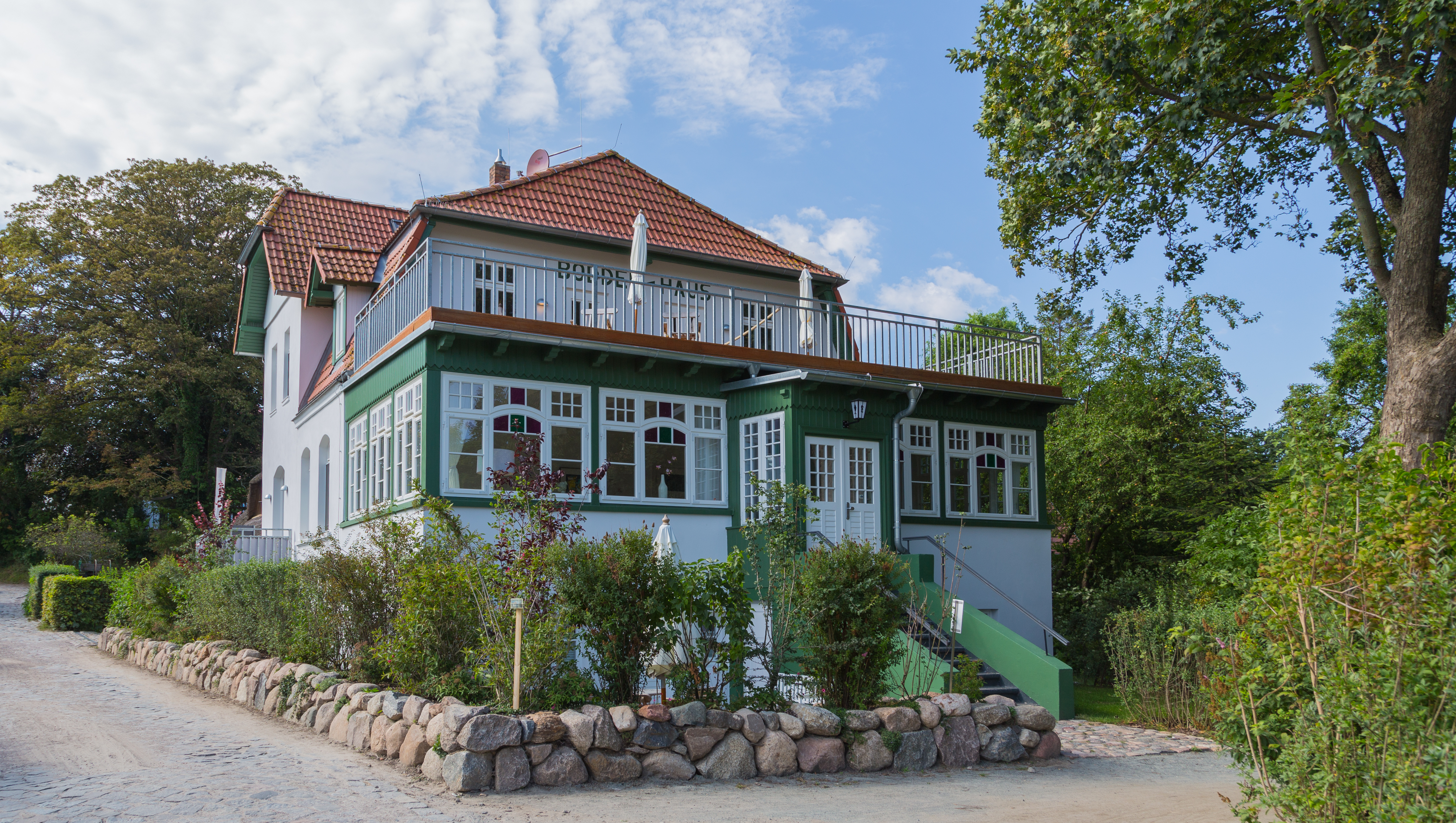
Boddenhaus

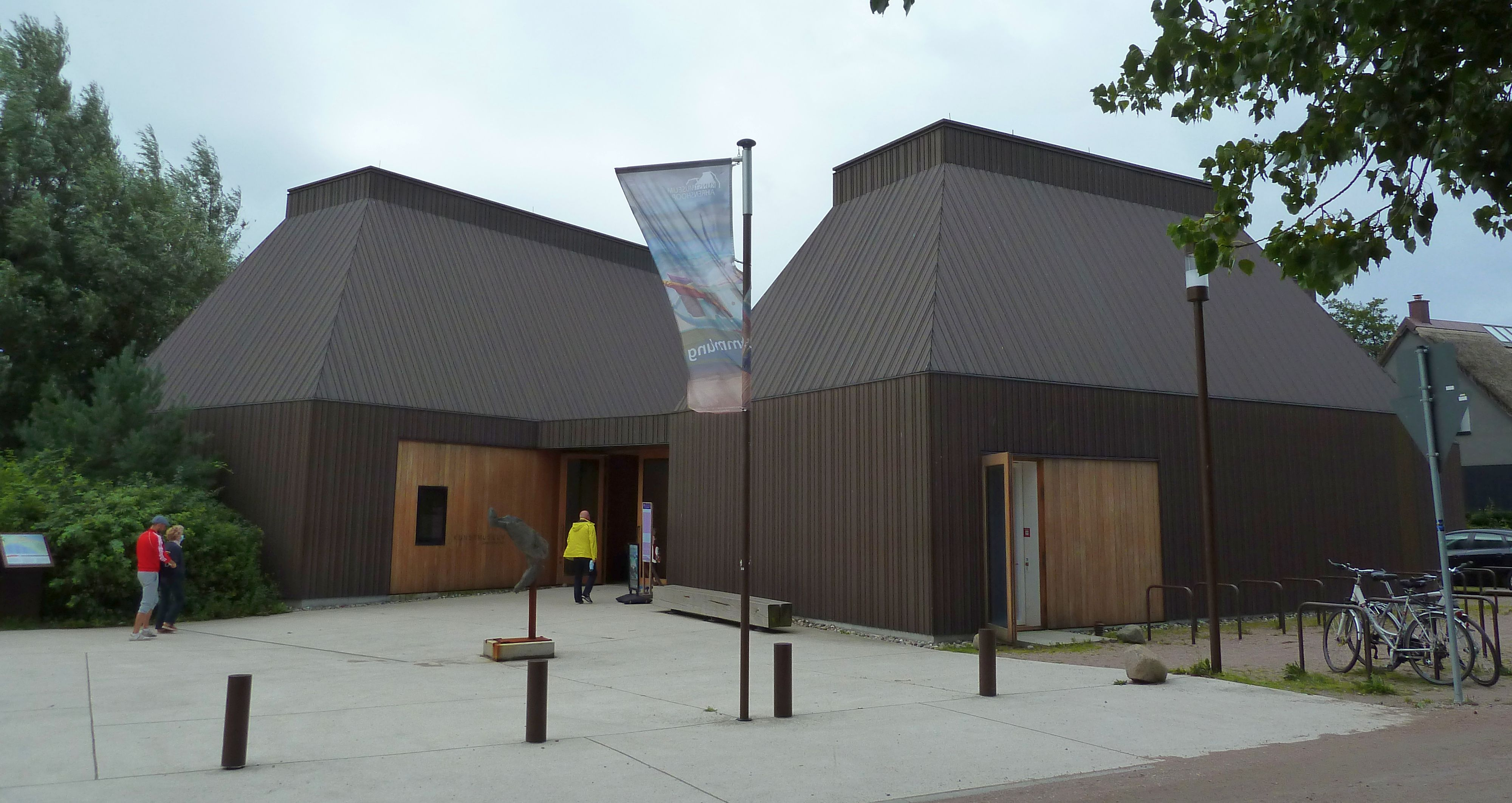
Art Museum

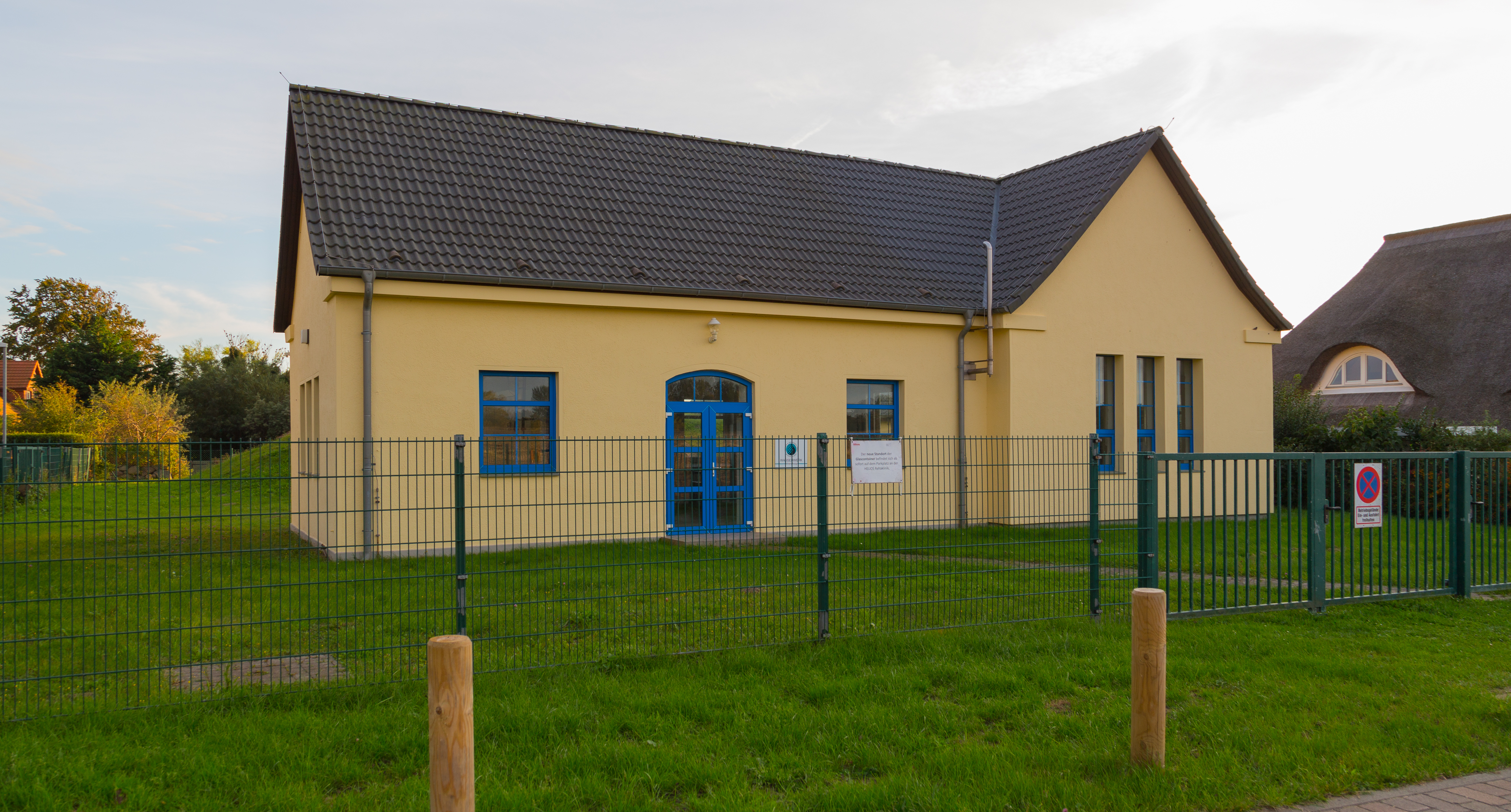
Waterworks

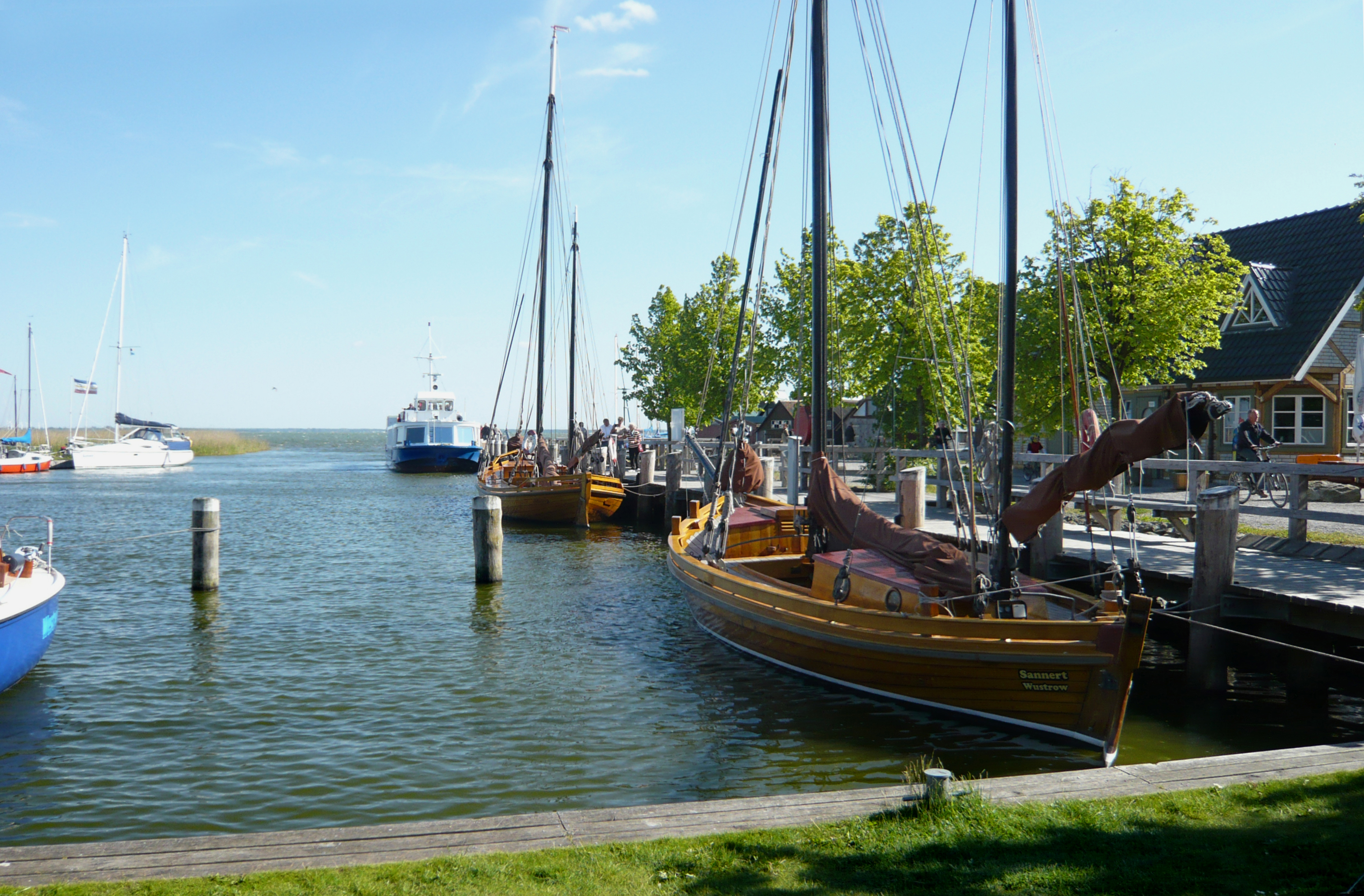
Port

=== Paintings ===
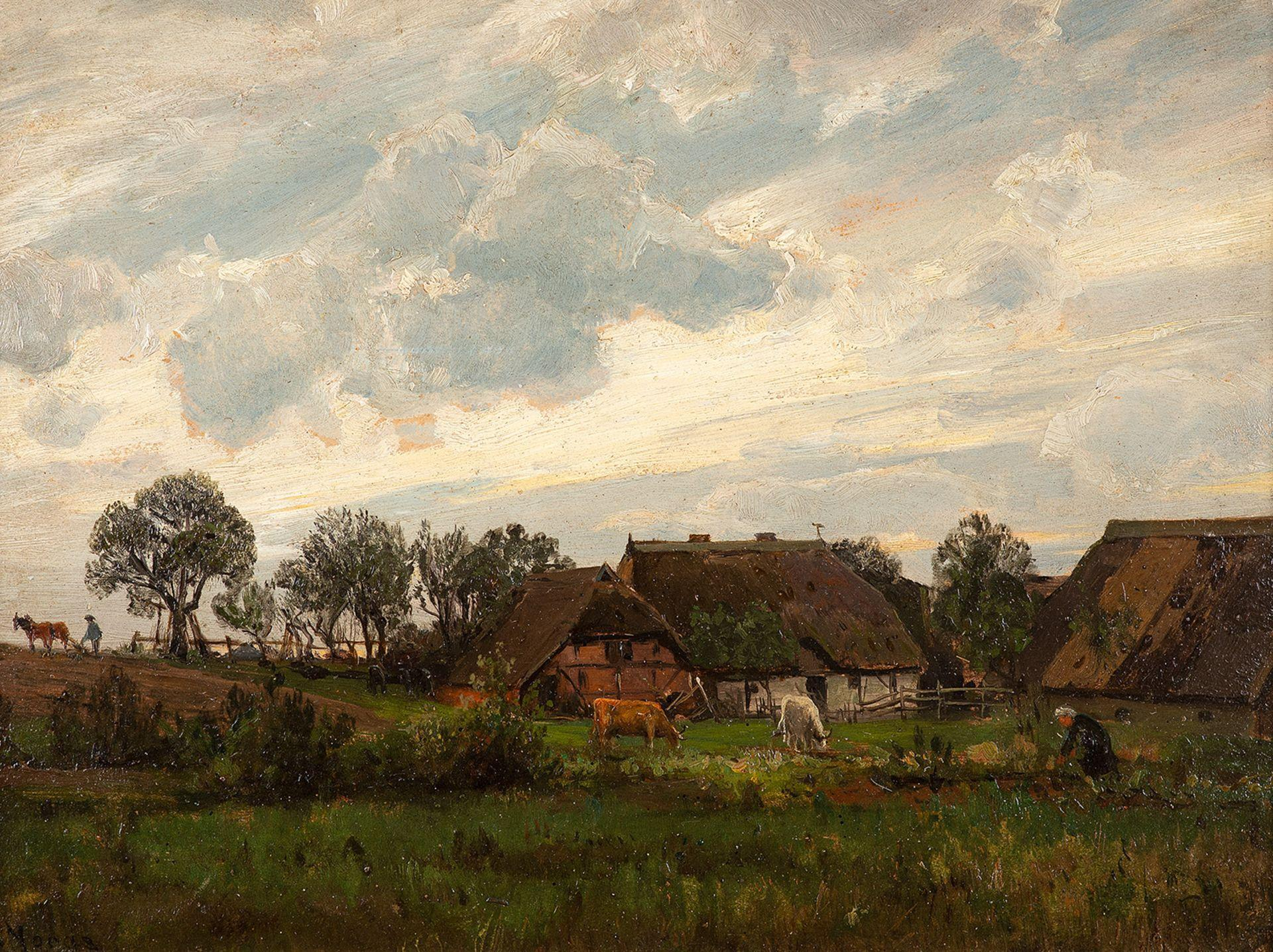
Althagen by Walter Moras

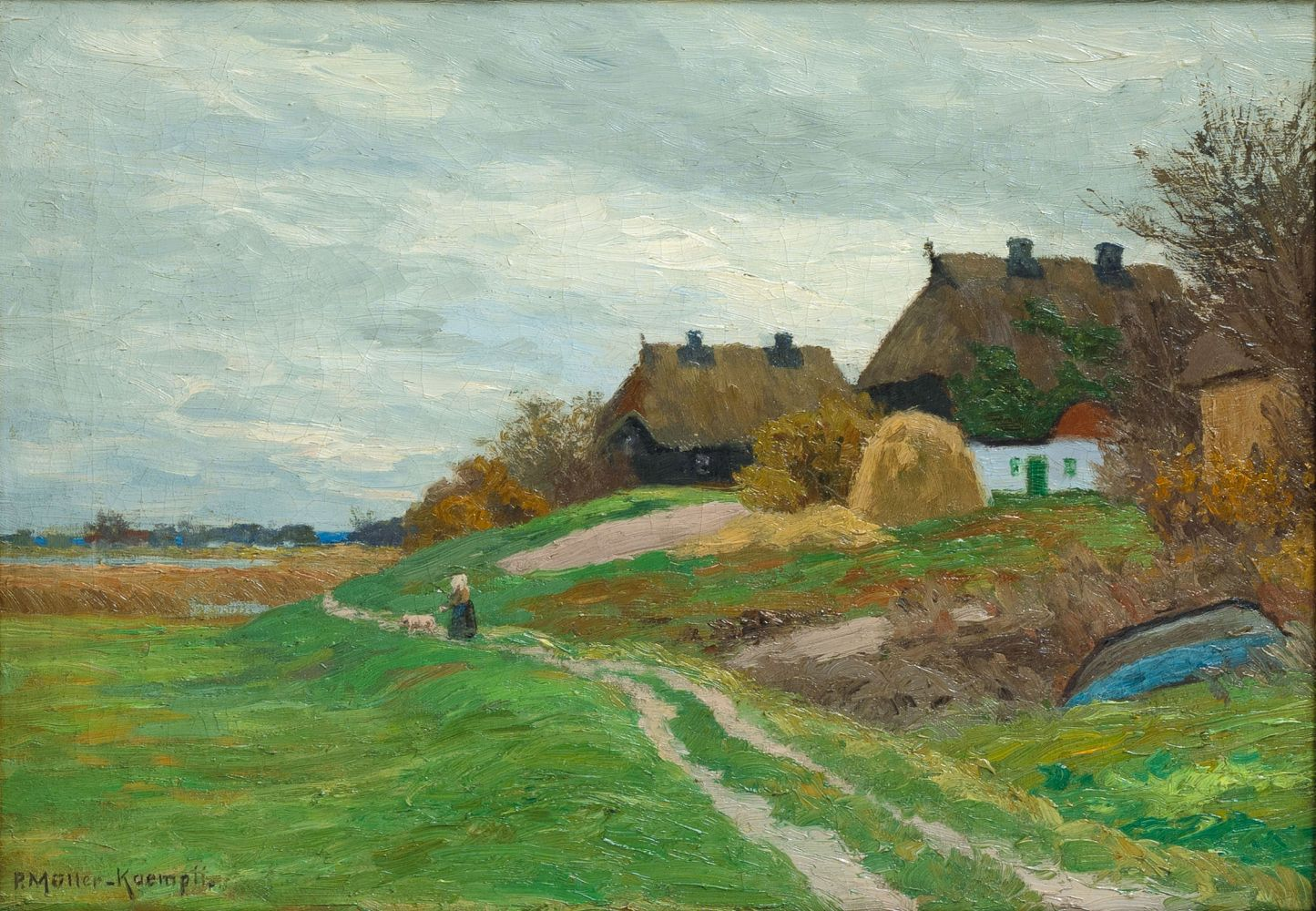
Althagen am Bodden by Paul Müller-Kaempff

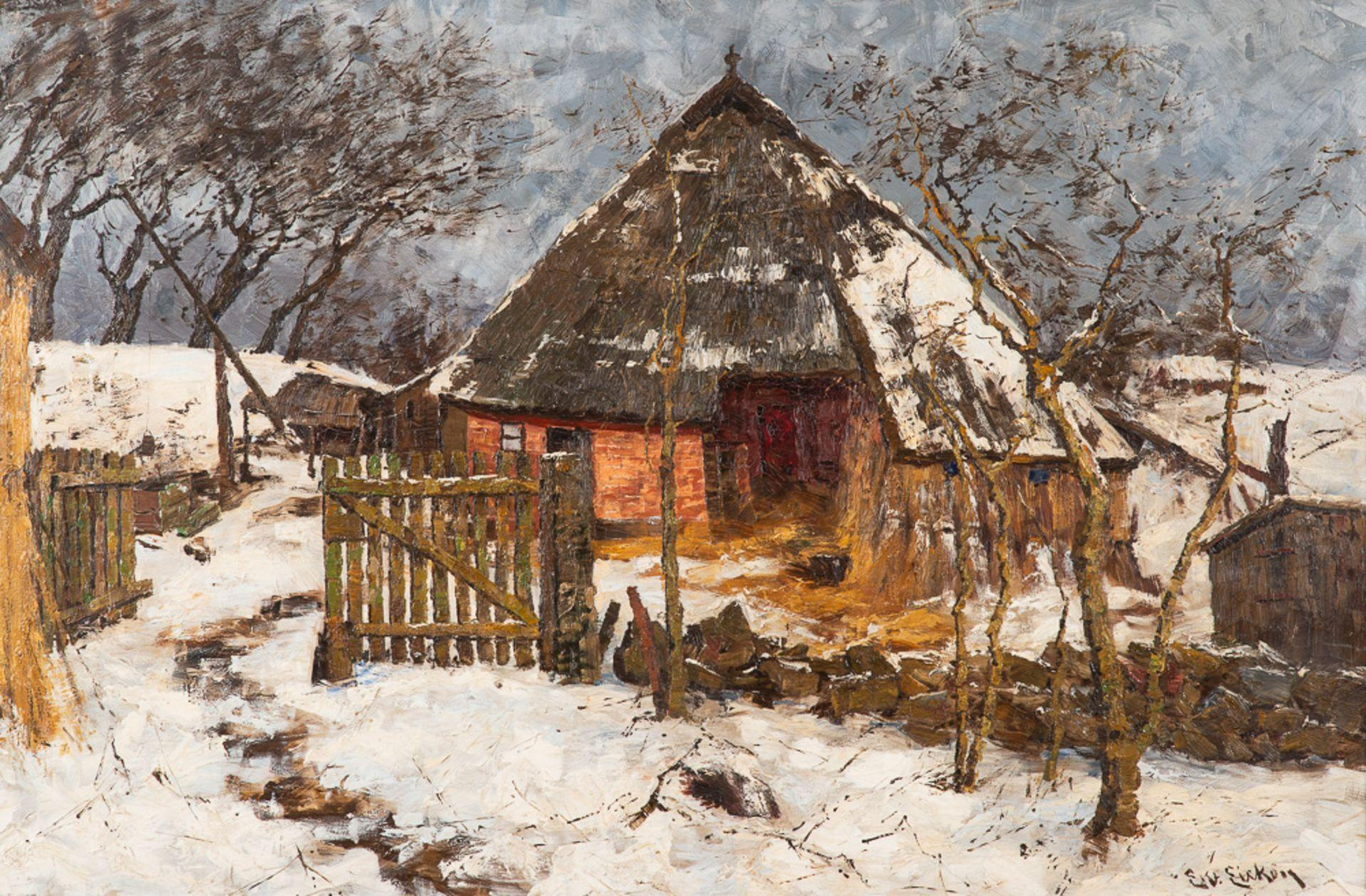
Das Dornenhaus in winterlichem Tauschnee by Elisabeth von Eicken

== Notable people ==
- Fritz Koch-Gotha (1877-1956), illustrator
- Gertrud Kleinhempel (1875-1948), designer
- Dora Koch-Stetter (1881-1968), painter
- Käthe Miethe (1893-1961), journalist and writer
- Wilhelm Löber (1903-1981), ceramist
- Arnold Klünder (1909-1976), ceramist
- Frida Löber (1910-1989), painter
- Barbara Klünder (1919-1988), ceramist
