= Fischland =

Coordinates: 54°19′57″N 12°22′44″E

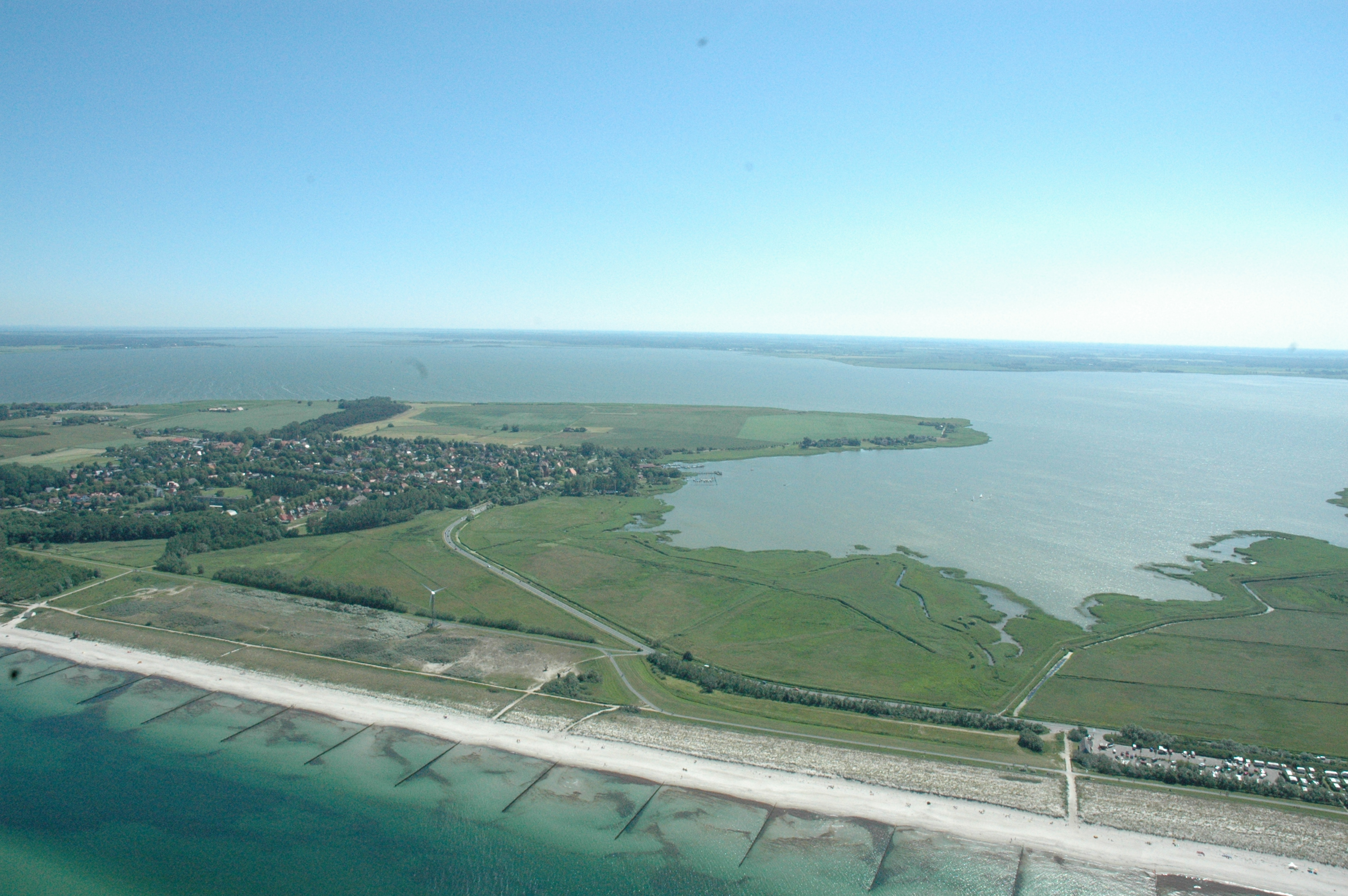
Narrowest point on Fischland, near Wustrow

Fischland (German pronunciation: [ˈfɪʃlant], literally "fish land") is an isthmus on the southern Baltic Sea coast on the Bay of Mecklenburg in northeastern Germany. It is part of the peninsula of Fischland-Darß-Zingst. Fischland was an island until the 14th century and was bounded by the navigable estuarine branches of the River Recknitz: the Permin in the south and the Loop in the north. In more recent times its southern boundary has usually been considered to be the Recknitz Meadowland (Recknitzer Stadtwiesen) and the Rostock Heath (Rostocker Heide). To the west and east its boundaries are more obvious: on the one side is its active cliffed coast on the Baltic, and on the other the coastline alongside the Saaler Bodden, only a few centimetres above sea level. Fischland is about 5 km long, between 500 metres and 2 km wide and runs from southwest to northeast.

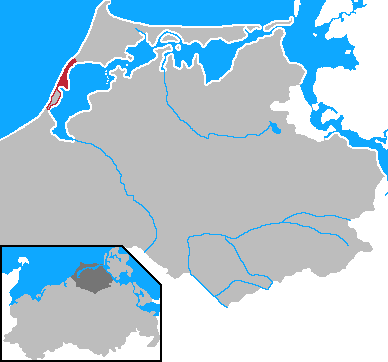
Location of the peninsula of Fischland

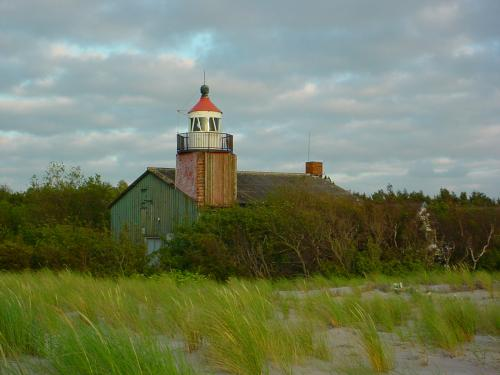
Beacon on Fischland

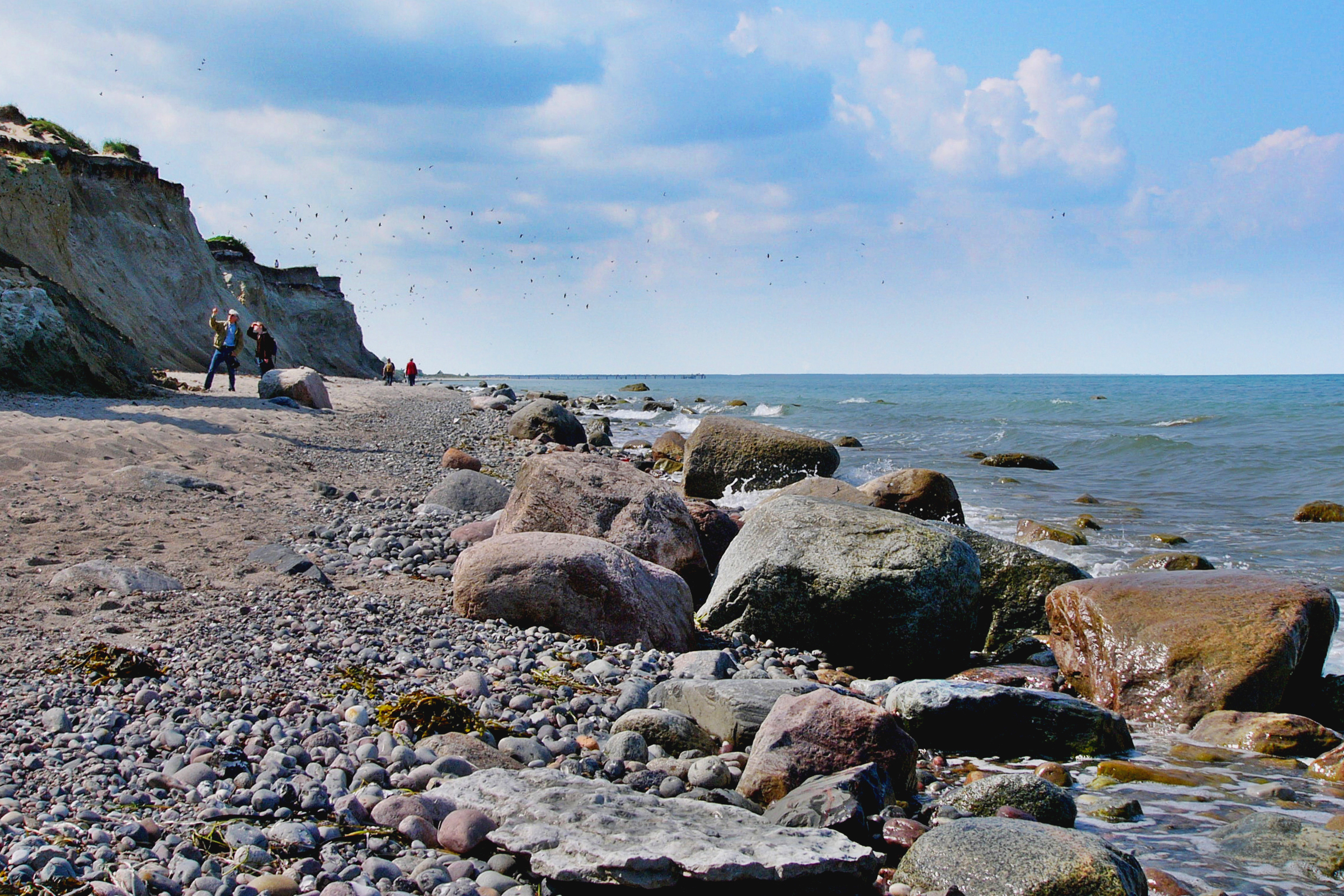
Steep coast near Ahrenshoop with a sand martin colony

The Pleistocene island core, which is subjected to marked changes as a result of water and wind action, consists of glacial sands (Geschiebesanden) and till and forms part of a graded shoreline. Not until the end of the 14th century were the two existing channels between the Baltic Sea and the lagoon or bodden filled in by the Hanseatic League in order to make access to the sea more difficult for their rival, Ribnitz. As a result, Fischland and Darß became a peninsula.

Today storms carry away an average of half a metre of coast per year from Fischland, depositing it again further north at Darßer Ort. Without major coastal defence measures the narrow isthmus would probably have long since been destroyed.

Near the steep coastline of Althagen/Niehagen lies the eminence of Bakelberg. At 17.9 metres above sea level (NN) it is the highest elevation on Fischland.

There is a total of just four settlements on Fischland, which have largely merged with one another today: the Ahrenshoop villages of Althagen and Niehagen as the municipality of Wustrow with the village of Barnstorf. The village of Ahrenshoop, well known as a residence and holiday resort for artists, on West Pomeranian soil is not on Fischland, however, but on the Vordarß. To the north Fischland is bounded by the present-day boundary trail (Grenzweg) in the municipality of Ahrenshoop. This used to be the site of the Loop, an inlet that marked the border between Mecklenburg and Pomerania; until recent times it continued to form the border between the Mecklenburg and Pomeranian State Churches.

== Sources ==
Maps

- Fischland, Darß, Zingst (double map), 1 : 30 000, grünes herz, Ilmenau/Ostseebad Wustrow. ISBN 978-3-929993-33-2

Guides and picture books

- Roland Buchwald: Fischland, Darß und Zingst. Landschafts- und Reiseführer für Wanderer, Wassersportler, Rad- und Autofahrer. grünes herz, Ilmenau/Ostseebad Wustrow. ISBN 3-929993-52-X
- Frank Thamm: Darß, Fischland und Zingst. Ellert und Richter, Hamburg. ISBN 3-89234-815-4
- Horst Prignitz, Thomas Grundner: Fischland, Darß, Zingst. Carl Hinstorff, Rostock. ISBN 3-356-01056-5
