= Klaus Praefcke =

German chemist (1933–2013)

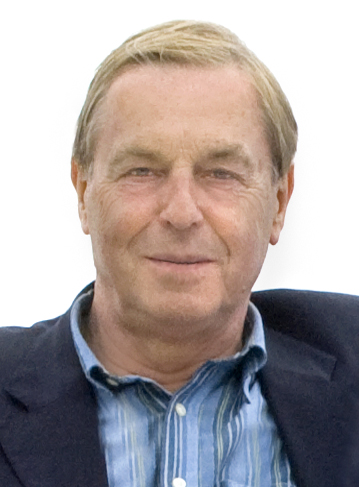
- Klaus Praefcke
- Born: 3 January 1933; Wustrow, Mecklenburg, Germany
- Died: 20 November 2013 (aged 80)
- Education: Technische Universität Berlin
- Known for: Liquid crystals
- Awards: Georg-Ernst-Stahl-Medal
- Scientific career
- Fields: Chemist
- Workplaces: Technische Universität Berlin
- Doctoral advisor: Alexander Schönberg

Klaus Praefcke (3 January 1933 – 20 November 2013) was a German chemist. He was born in Wustrow and studied in Berlin under the supervision of Alexander Schönberg. After completing his Ph.D. in 1963 and his habilitation in 1970, he became Professor of Organic Chemistry at Technische Universität Berlin in 1971. He stayed dedicated to the research until 1998 at the same institution.

Praefcke has published more than 300 scientific papers dedicated to organic synthesis. He is known for his contributions to preparative organic photochemistry as well as physics and chemistry of liquid crystals. Several novel types of liquid crystals have been synthesized by Praefcke for the first time.
