= Bakelberg =

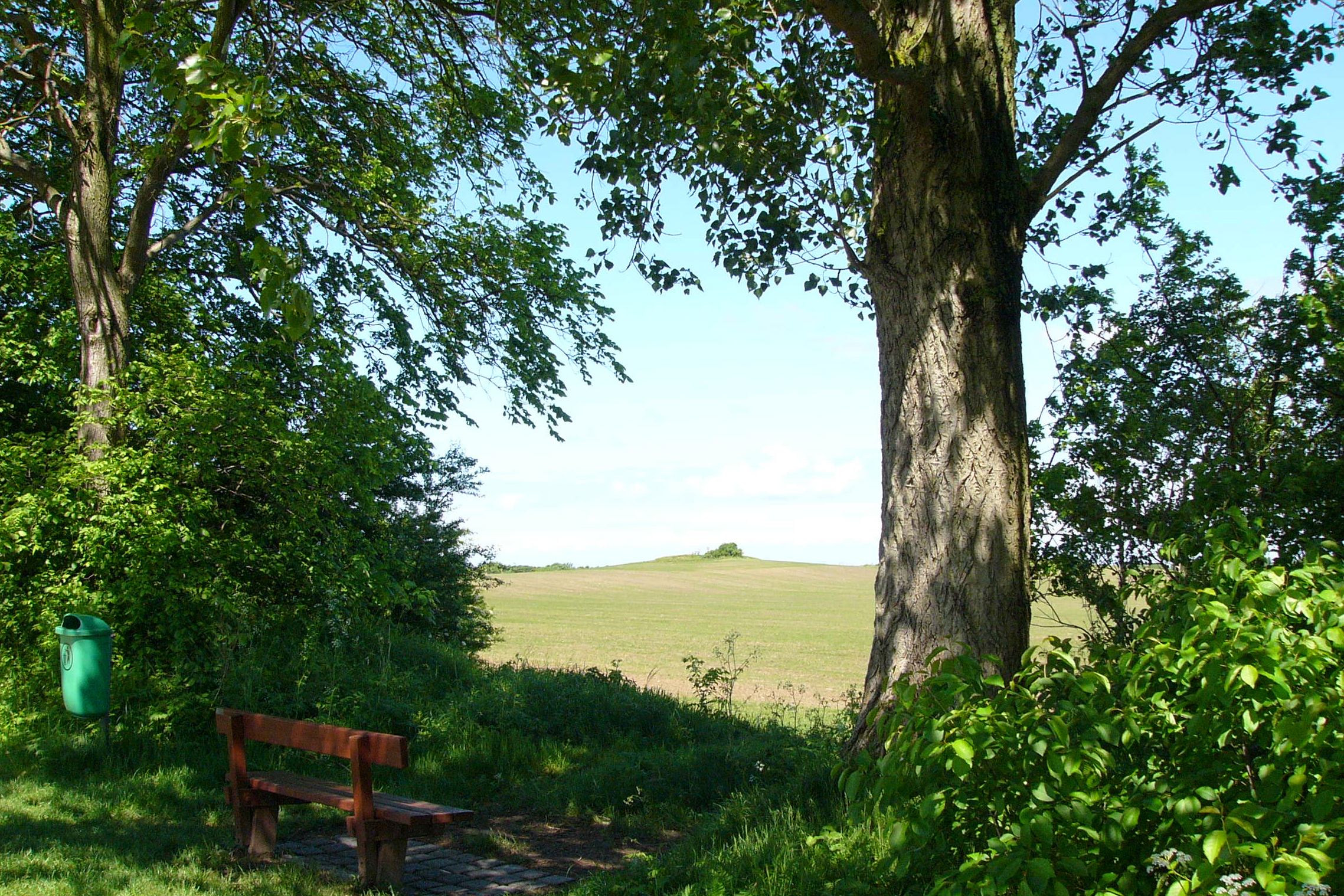
- View of the Bakelberg near Ahrenshoop

Highest point
- Elevation: 18 m above sea level (NN) (59 ft)
- Coordinates: 54°21′50″N 12°24′04″E

Geography
- Location within Mecklenburg-Vorpommern
- Location: Mecklenburg-Vorpommern (Germany)

The Bakelberg (German pronunciation: [ˈbaːkl̩ˌbɛʁk]), at 18 metres above sea level, is the highest point on Fischland. It is in the municipality of Ahrenshoop in the county of Vorpommern-Rügen in the German state of Mecklenburg-Vorpommern.
