= Fischland-Darß-Zingst =

Peninsula on the German coast of the Baltic Sea

Coordinates: 54°24′42″N 12°32′28″E

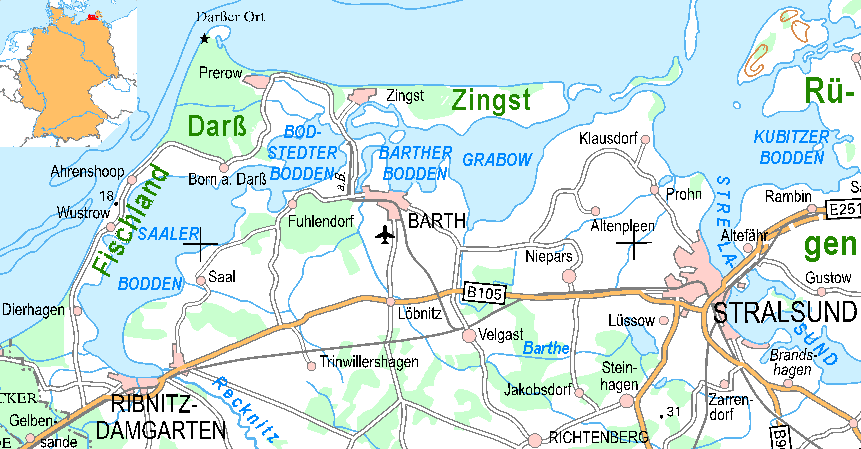
Fischland, Darß and Zingst

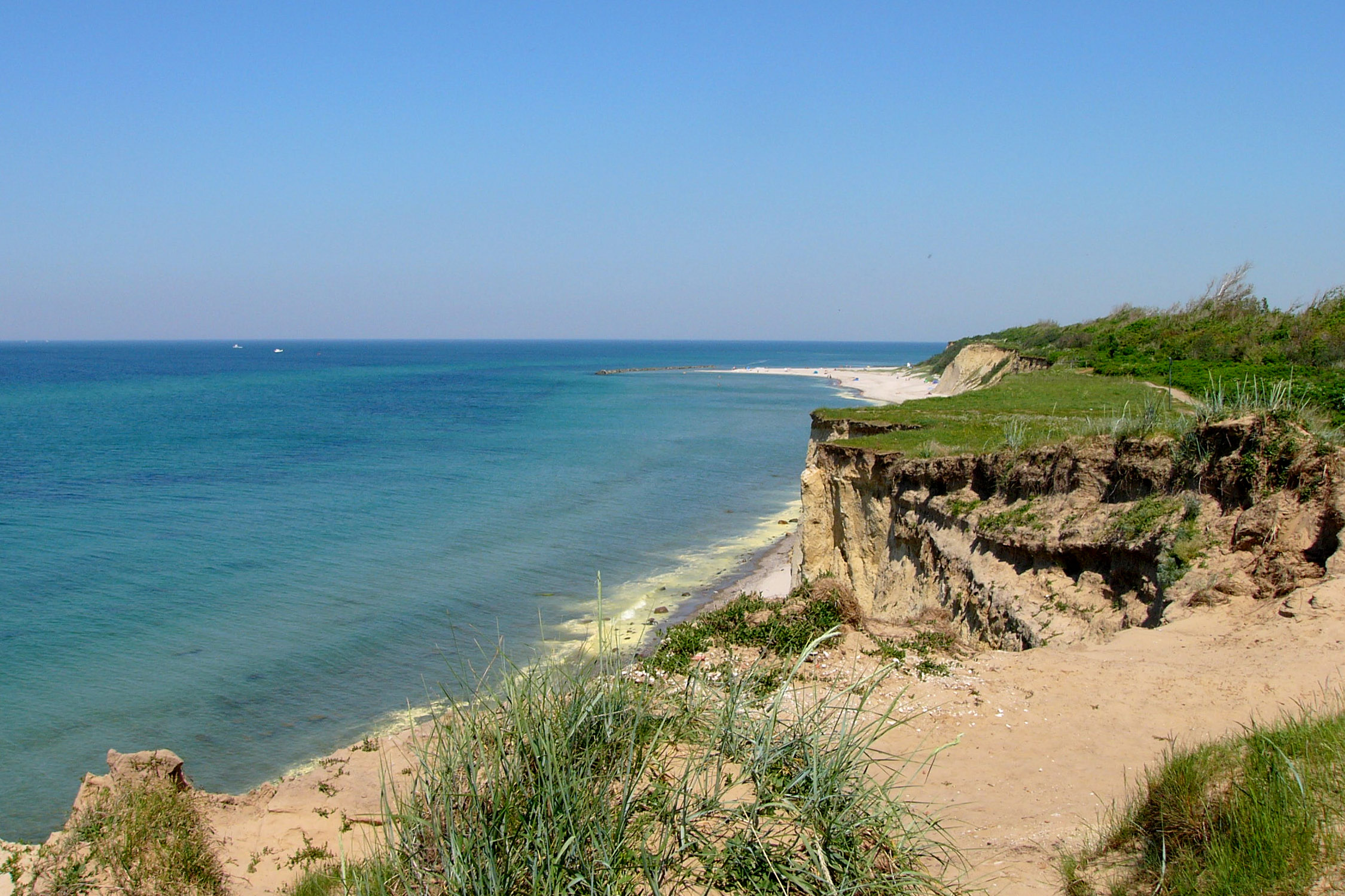
Steep coast and fine sand beach at Darss West Beach, near Ahrenshoop

Fischland-Darß-Zingst (German pronunciation: [ˈfɪʃlantˌdaʁsˈtsɪŋst]) is a 45 km (28 mi) long peninsula in the coastal district of Vorpommern-Rügen, in the German state of Mecklenburg-Vorpommern. The three parts of the peninsula, from west to east, are Fischland (part of Mecklenburg), Darß and Zingst (part of Pomerania).

There are six villages on the peninsula - Wustrow, Ahrenshoop, Born, Wieck, Prerow and Zingst. Between the peninsula and the mainland there is a very shallow lagoon (Low German: bodden), the Saaler Bodden, which is part of the Western Pomerania Lagoon Area National Park, together with the peninsula.

== History ==
The main part of Fischland as well as the Darß and the Zingst were originally islands. They became permanently joined to the mainland as a result of humans sealing the floodwater channels between the 14th and 19th centuries.

During the 1872 Baltic Sea flood, which inundated Prerow on the Darß, the Prerower Strom, that had hitherto separated the island of Zingst from Darß, silted up. In 1874 the Prerow-Strom was finally filled in and sealed with a dyke; Zingst thus became a peninsula.

The eastern part of the Zingst peninsula and the middle of the Darß are part of the West Pomeranian Lagoon Area National Park.

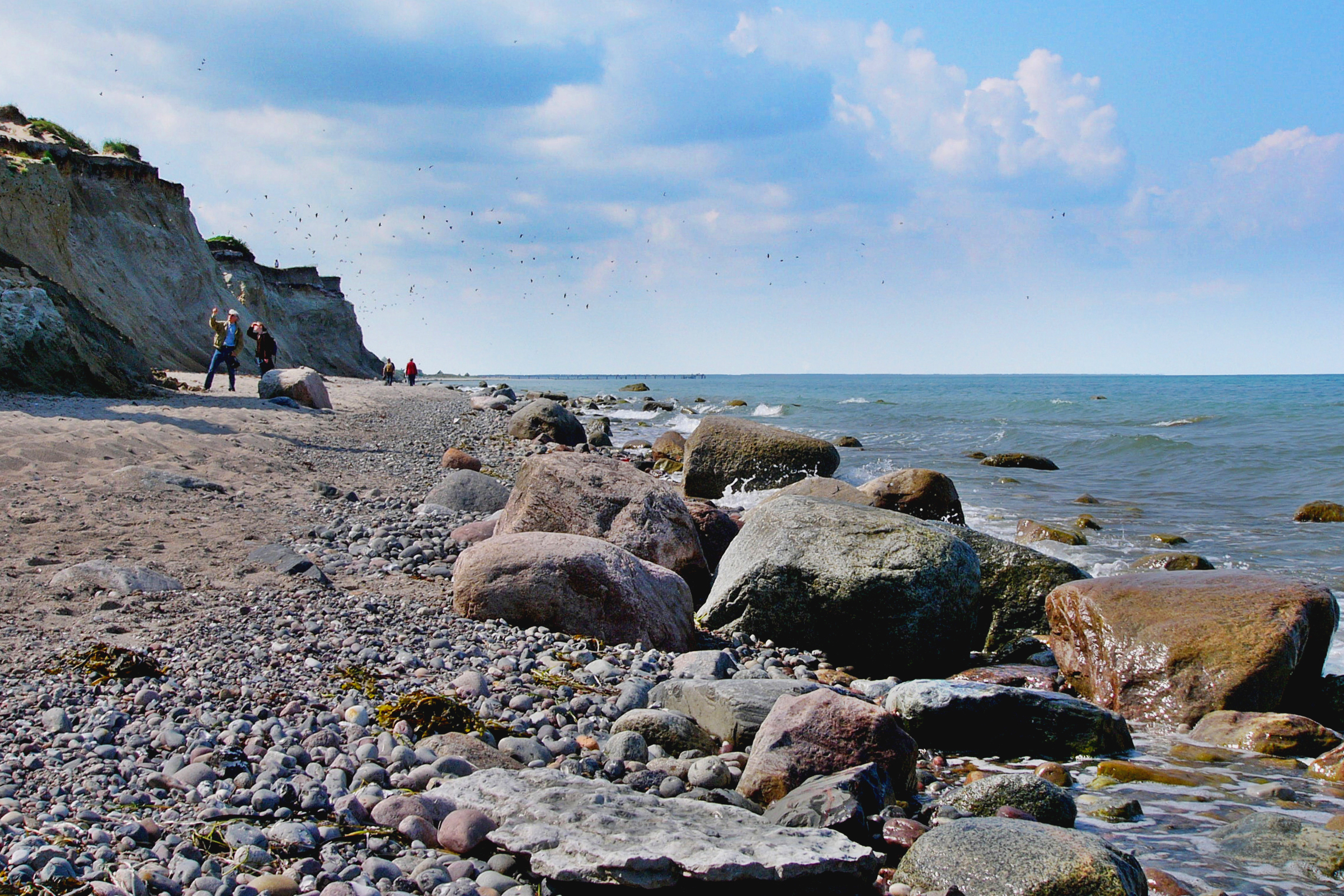
Fischland: Sea cliffs near Ahrenshoop

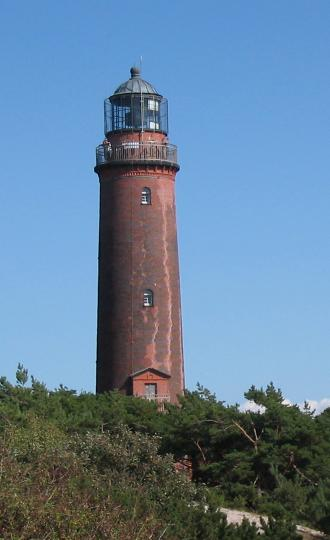
Darss: Darßer Ort lighthouse

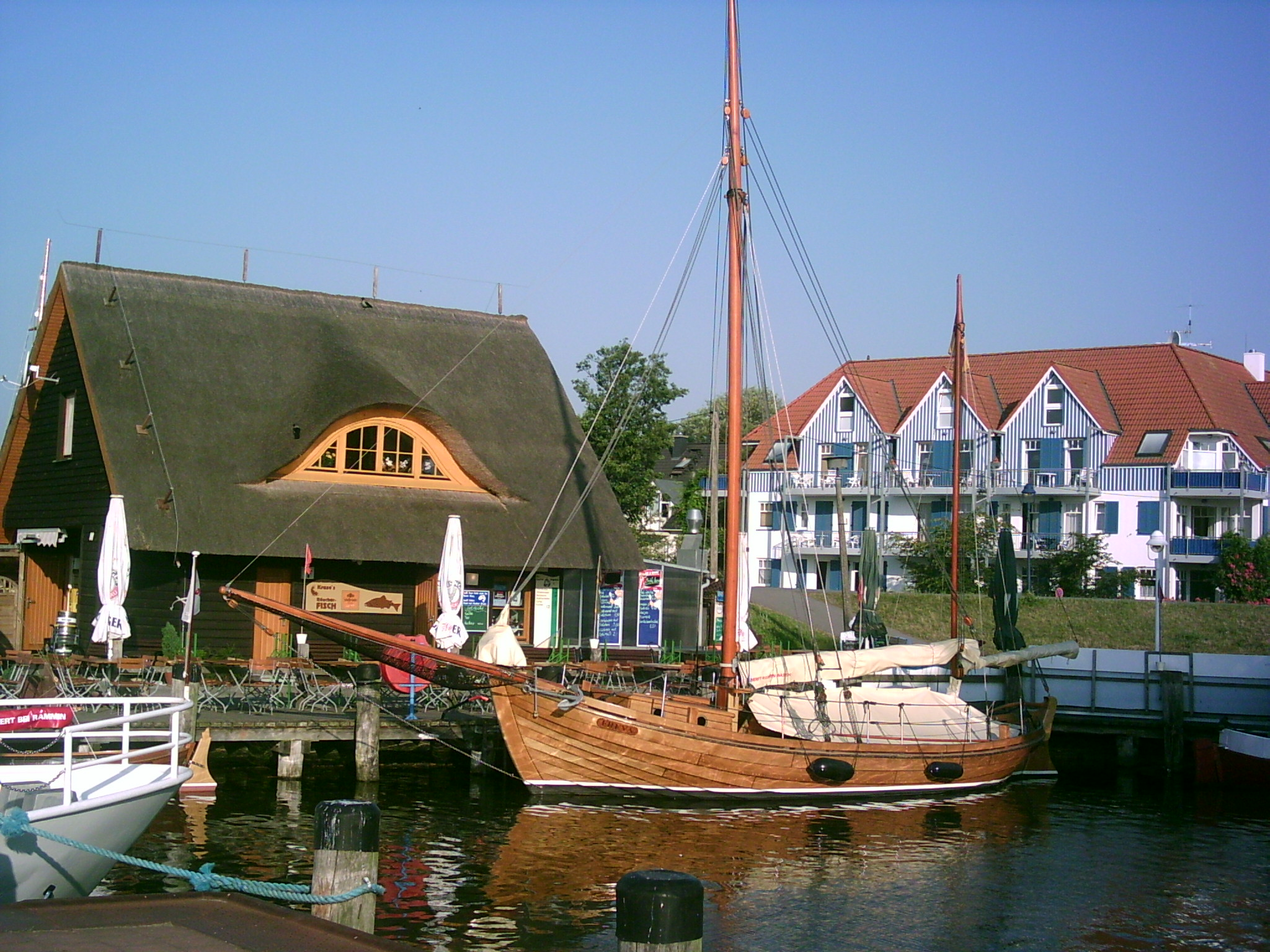
Zingst: Harbour

== See also ==
- List of peninsulas
