= Saaler Bodden =

Bay on the Baltic Sea coast of Germany

Coordinates: 54°19′N 12°27′E

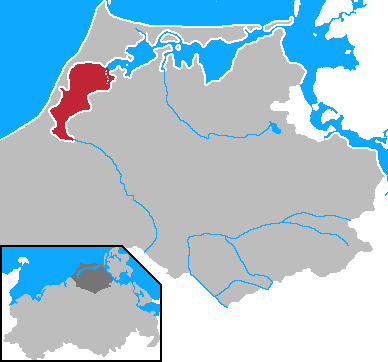
Location of the Saaler Bodden

The Saaler Bodden forms the southwestern part of the Darss-Zingst Bodden Chain and lies east of the Fischland peninsula about 30 kilometres northeast of Rostock. Its average depth is around two metres, which restricts angling and the use of pleasure craft. It is a lagoon-like stretch of water known as a bodden, which is typical of this part of the Baltic coastline. South of the Saaler Bodden is the town of Ribnitz-Damgarten, which is divided into two by the mouth of the 72 kilometre long Recknitz river. This southern part of the bodden is called the Lake Ribnitz (Ribnitzer See).

Apart from the Recknitz near Damgarten, the other streams that empty into the Ribnitzer See are the Klosterbach near Ribnitz and Körkwitzer Bach and Fischergraben near Körkwitz. A stream called the Saaler Bach (in its lower reaches known as the Ziegelgraben) discharges into the bodden near Saal.

To the northeast the Koppelstrom links this bodden to the next one in the chain, the Bodstedter Bodden. Two former channels to the Baltic Sea, the Permin and the Loop, silted up in the 14th century.

The water of the Saaler Bodden is weakly salty (1-3 permille).

== Gallery ==
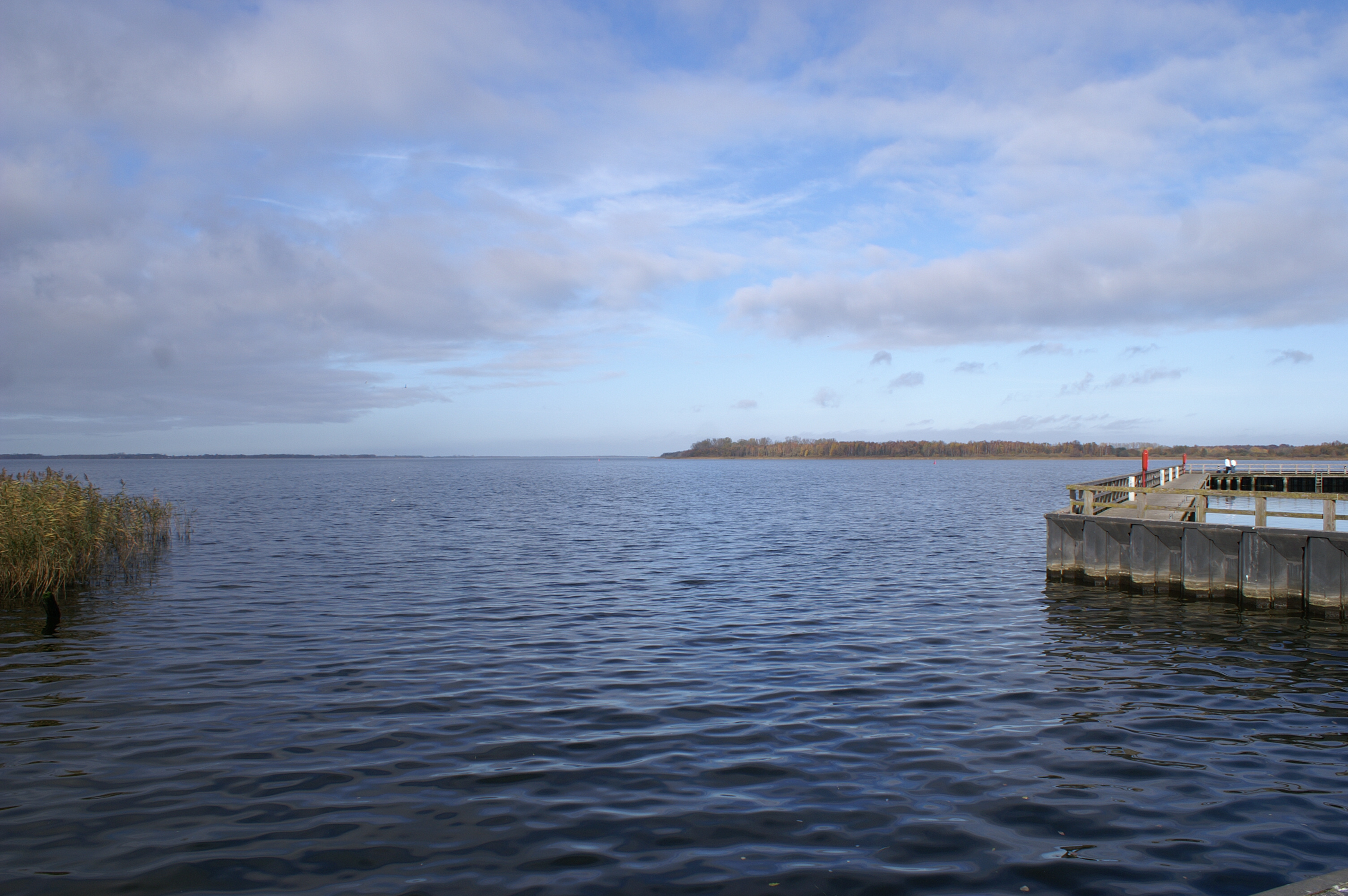
View over Lake Ribnitz to the Saaler Bodden

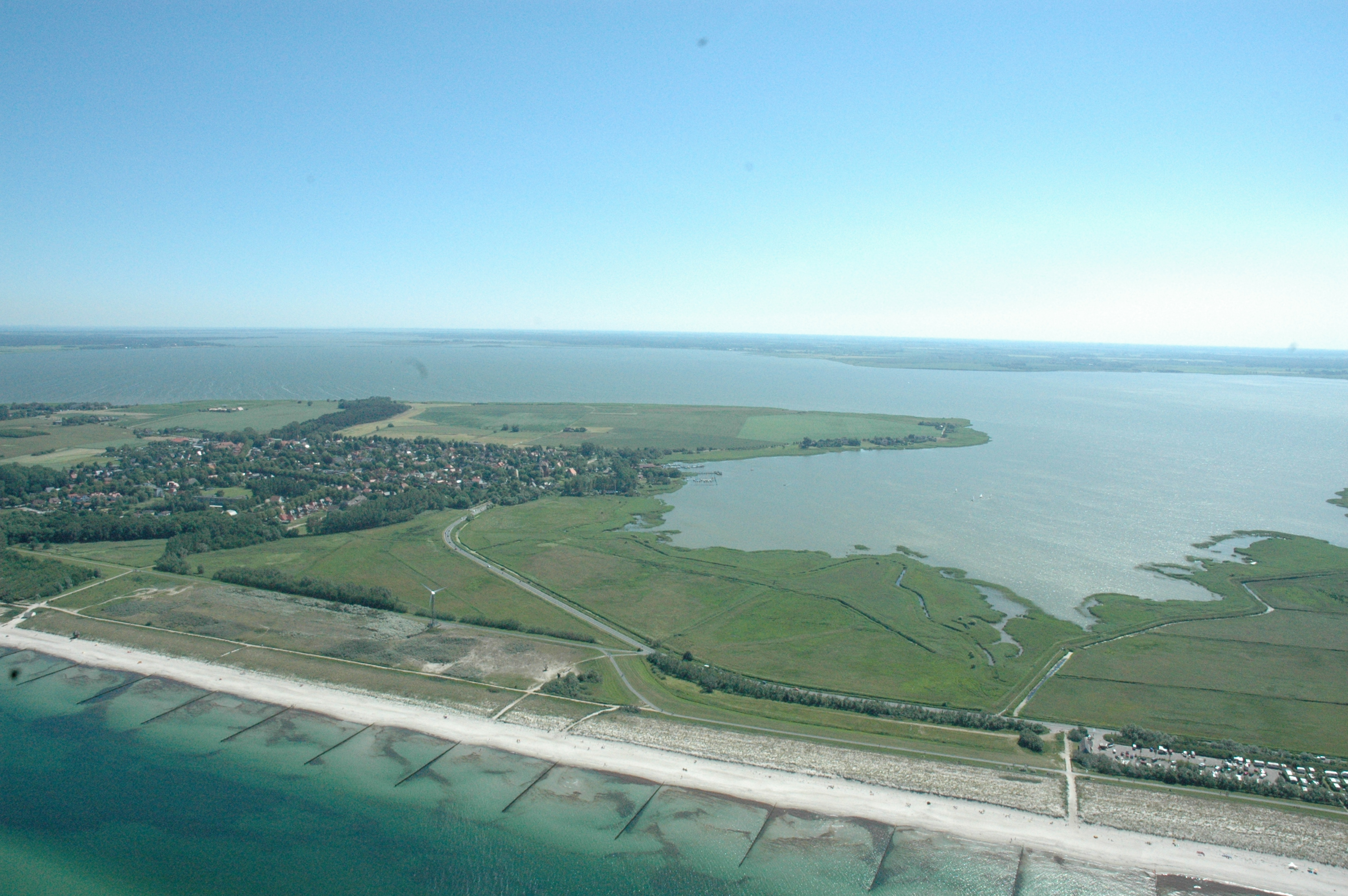
Aerial photographs of the Saaler Bodden with Permin in the foreground

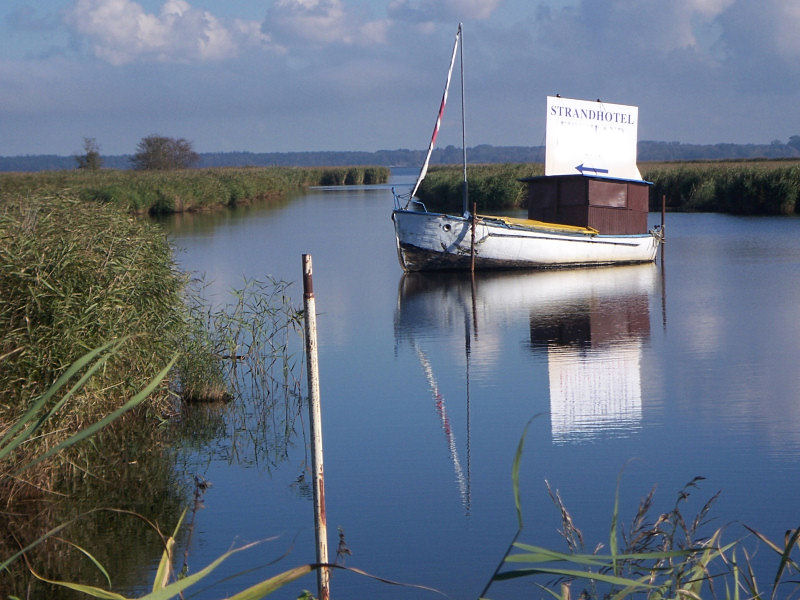
On the Saaler Bodden near Dierhagen
