= Ribnitz-Damgarten =

Town in Mecklenburg-Vorpommern, Germany

- Town
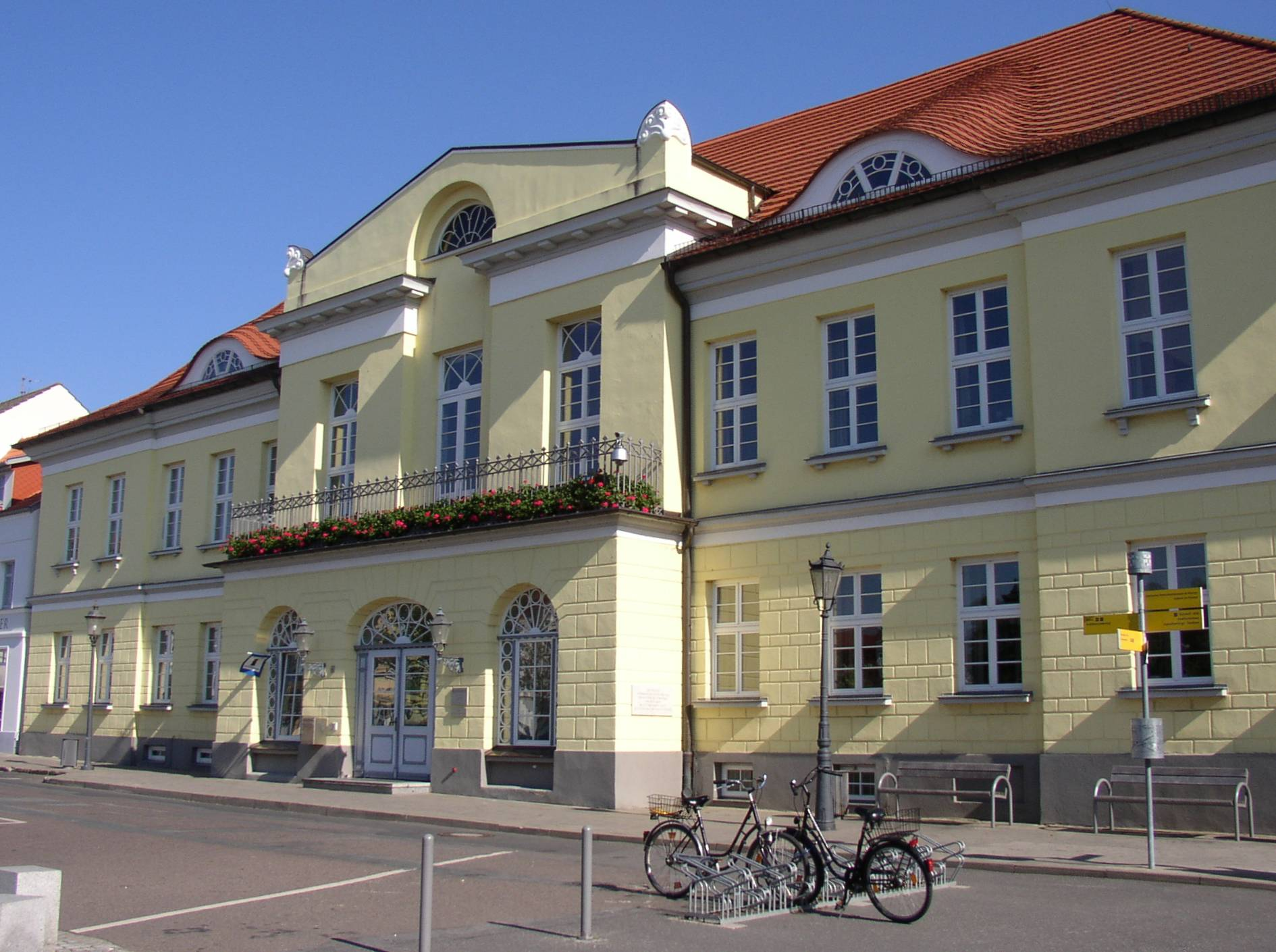
- Town hall

- Coat of arms

- Location of Ribnitz-Damgarten within Vorpommern-Rügen district
- Interactive map of Ribnitz-Damgarten
- Location within Germany Location within Mecklenburg-Vorpommern
- Coordinates: 54°15′N 12°28′E
- Country: Germany
- State: Mecklenburg-Vorpommern
- District: Vorpommern-Rügen
- Municipal assoc.: Ribnitz-Damgarten

Government
  - Mayor: Thomas Huth (Die Unabhängigen)

Area
  - Total: 122.83 km^{2} (47.42 sq mi)
- Elevation: 5 m (16 ft)

Population (2025-12-31)
  - Total: 15,297
  - Density: 124.54/km^{2} (322.55/sq mi)
- Time zone: UTC+01:00 (CET)
  - Summer (DST): UTC+02:00 (CEST)
- Postal codes: 18311
- Dialling codes: 03821
- Vehicle registration: NVP
- Website: www.ribnitz-damgarten.de

Ribnitz-Damgarten (German pronunciation: [ˈʁɪpnɪts ˈdamɡaʁtn̩]) is a town in Mecklenburg-Vorpommern, Germany, situated on Lake Ribnitz (Ribnitzer See). Ribnitz-Damgarten is in the west of the district Vorpommern-Rügen.

The border between the historical regions of Mecklenburg and Pomerania goes directly through the town; Damgarten is the eastern and Pomeranian part, and Ribnitz is the western and Mecklenburgian part.

== Geography ==
The town is situated between the two Hanseatic cities Rostock and Stralsund, on the mouth of the river Recknitz. The Ribnitzer See, into which the Recknitz empties, is a bay of the Saaler Bodden (Bay of Saal). The Saaler Bodden in turn is the south-western end of a chain of bays leading to the Baltic Sea.

Touristically relevant is Ribnitz-Damgarten's situation at the southern end of the Fischland, the peninsula dividing the chain of bays from the Baltic Sea.

== History ==
The town's name derives in the Slavic settlements Rybanis (ryba means fish) and Damgor (dǫbǔ means oak tree, gora means hill), located on opposite sides of the mouth of the Recknitz river.

In ancient times, the Recknitz formed the border between Mecklenburg and Pomerania. At the ford a castle was built about 1200 on the Mecklenburg side, being the precursor of Ribnitz. The Danish princes of Rügen responded by erecting a fortress on the opposite side that later became the town of Damgarten.

Ribnitz as a town is first documented in 1233, documents point to town privileges under Lübeck law being established before 1257. Damgarten was granted such privileges in 1258 by Jaromar II, Duke of Rügen, as Damechore.

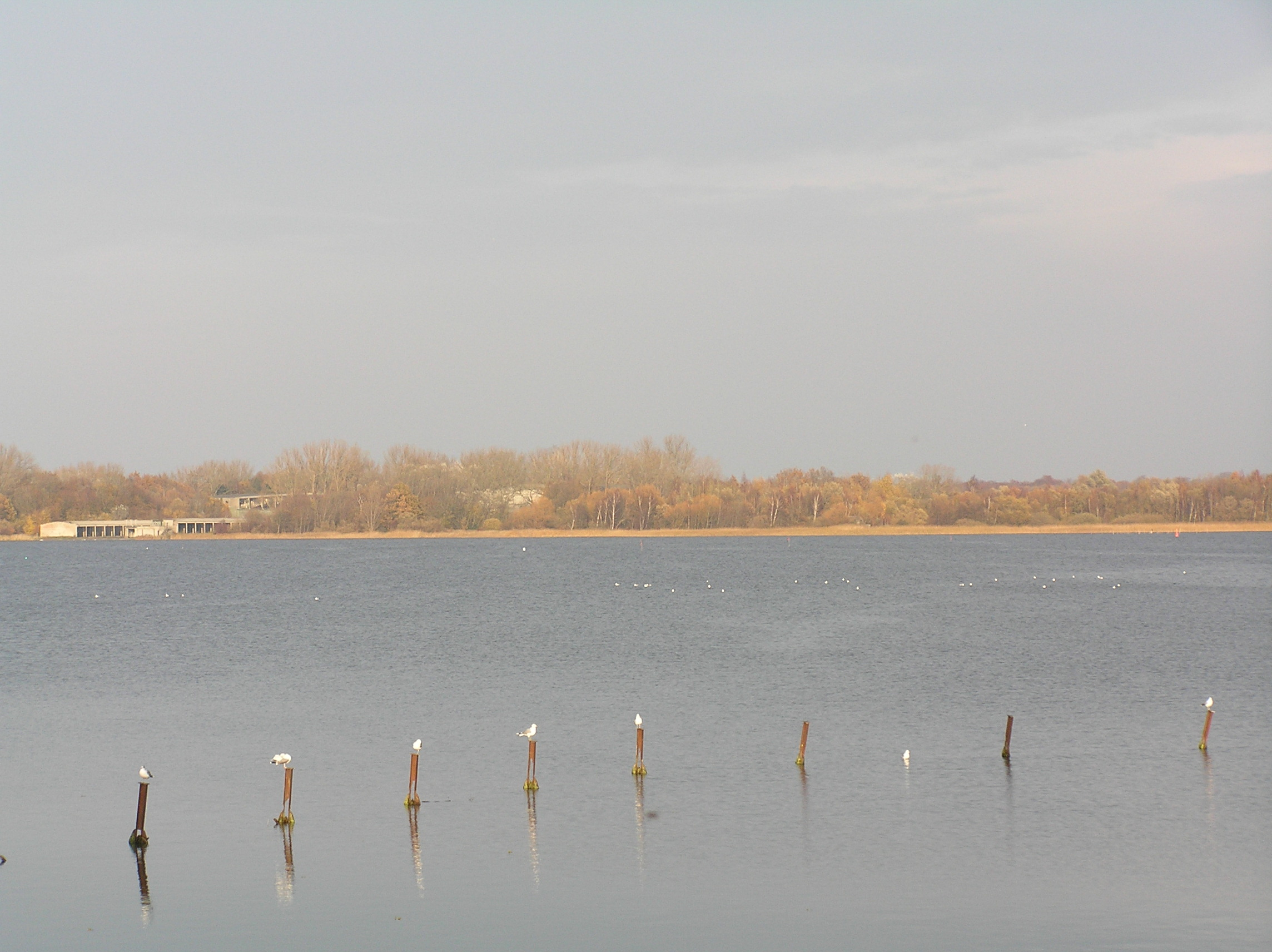
Look at Pütnitz over the Ribnitzer See

In 1934, Walter Bachmann moved his airplane repair and production business from Rostock to Ribnitz. The company was specialized in seaplanes, for which nearness to open water was essential. The Walter-Bachmann-Flugzeugbau KG, as it was later called, turned the fisher's and farmer's town into a seat of war-essential production. The influx of workers for the factory, among other factors, increased the population of Ribnitz from 4772 in 1930 to 8925 in 1942.

At the same time as the Bachmann works in Pütnitz, near Damgarten, an air force base was built. Like the Bachmann works for Ribnitz, so did they increase Damgarten's population, which doubled from 1933 to 1939. Primarily it was a training center for seaplane personnel. After World War II, this base became one of the major deployments of the Soviet Air Forces in East Germany. 16th Guards Fighter Aviation Division of 16th Air Army was headquartered at the base from the 1950s until 1993.

On the 5th of July 1950, the former towns of Ribnitz and Damgarten were merged. As both towns' councils had previously voted against the merger, it can be supposed that this decision was made under political pressure.

== Amber Town ==
Ribnitz-Damgarten calls itself the Bernsteinstadt (Amber Town), due to its history of manufacturing jewelry and other things from amber. With the adoption of said title came also the introduction of a new town logo, the Bernsteinlogo, which is now used on official correspondence. It can also be seen on the Stadtblatt, an informational paper issued by the town council. The coat of arms shown in the information box is based on the blazon found in the Hauptsatzung (main charter) of Ribnitz-Damgarten.

Today, amber is processed in the so-called Schaumanufaktur (Show Manufacture), where its processing can be watched by visitors. The resulting jewelry can also be bought. A number of shops sell amber and handicraft made of amber.

Ribnitz is home to the German Amber Museum, which is seated in the former Poor Clare Convent. This museum contains a permanent exhibition that illustrates the origins and the applications of amber. Contemporary pieces of art made of amber are showcased in a separate room. A part of the museum is dedicated to the town's history.

== Sights ==
=== In Ribnitz ===
- Marienkirche (Saint Mary's Church, 1233)
- Rostocker Tor (Rostock Town Gate, 1290)
- Klarissenkloster (Poor Clare Convent, 1323)
- German Amber Museum

=== In Damgarten ===
- Church St. Bartholomäus (St. Bartholomew)
- Bernstein-Schaumanufaktur (Amber Show Manufacture)

Gallery

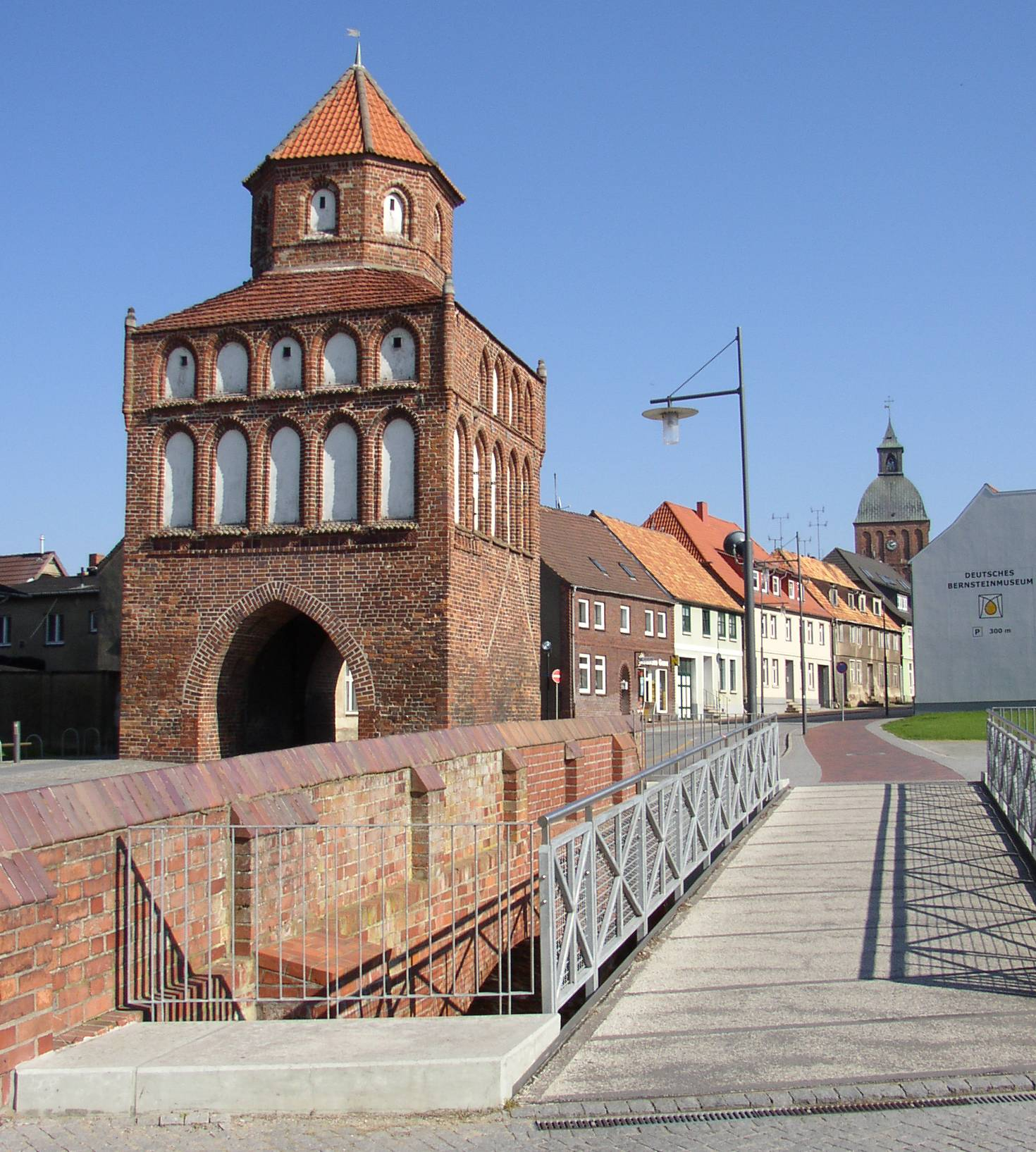
Rostocker Tor and Marienkirche

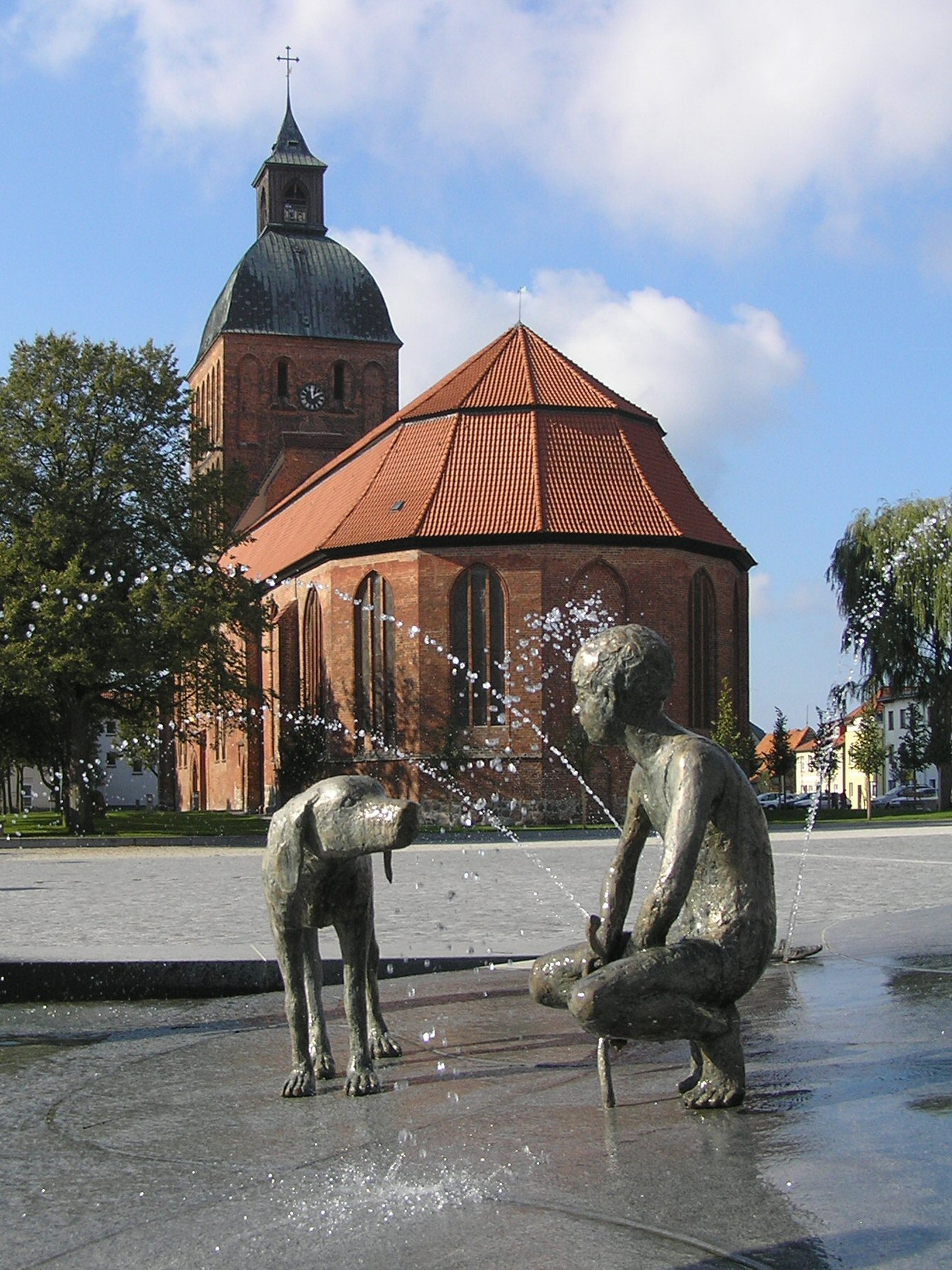
Market place in Ribnitz with Saint Mary's church and fountain

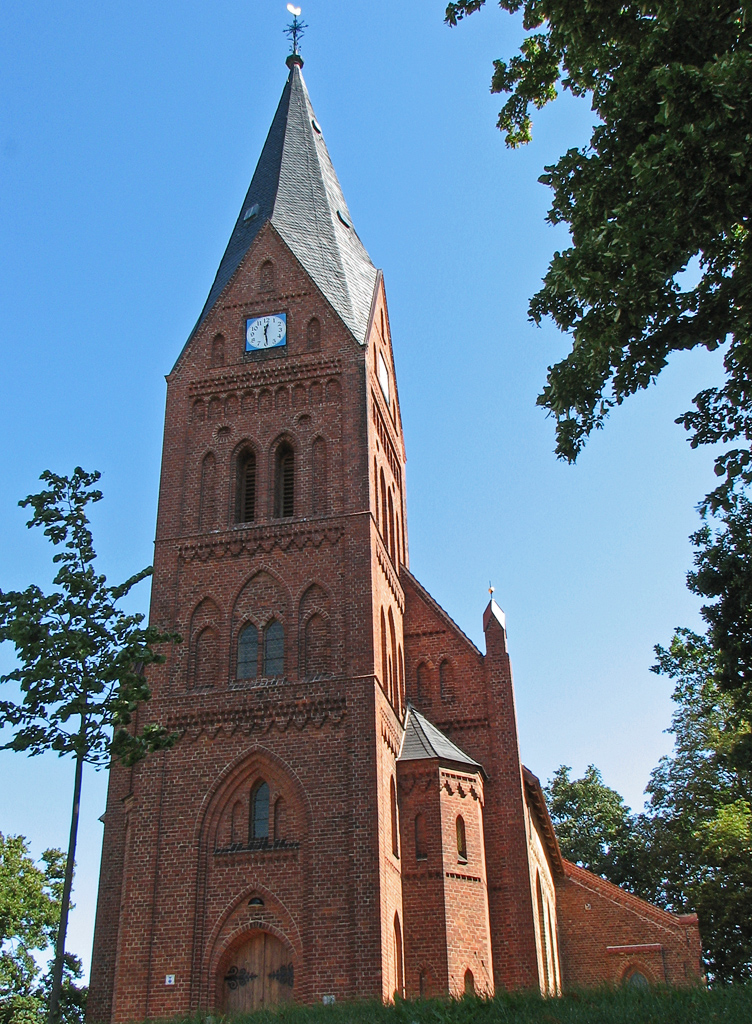
Church St. Bartholomäus in Damgarten

== International relations ==
Ribnitz-Damgarten is twinned with:

- Buxtehude, Germany
- Sławno, Poland
