= Steep coast =

Stretch of coastline that descends abruptly into the sea

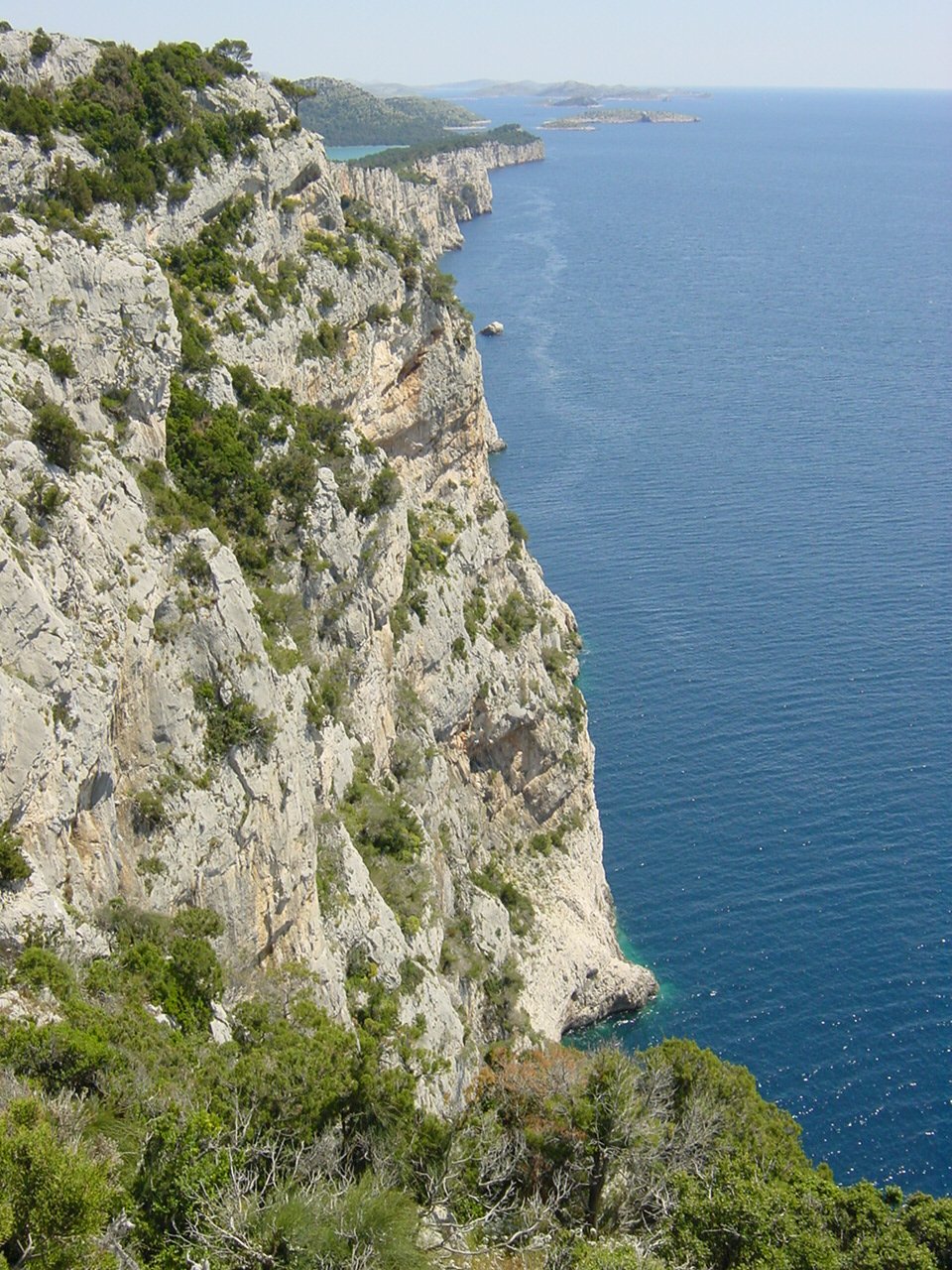
View of the steep coast on the island of Dugi Otok in Croatia

A steep coast is a stretch of coastline where the mainland descends abruptly into the sea. There is a sharp transition from the land to sea as opposed to that on a flat coast where the land descends gradually seawards. The height of the land on a steep coast is well above sea level.

Most steep coasts are rocky cliffed coasts (also called abrasion coasts), where the erosion processes of wave action result in a steep declivity. Another type of steep coast is the fjord which is formed when a glacial valley lies partially under water as a result of a rise in sea levels. In Norway, New Zealand or Alaska there are fjords whose almost vertical sides tower over 1,000 metres above the water and plunge 300 metres below it.

On volcanic islands the sea can enter the caldera and the face of the volcanic pipe can form a steep coastline. The best-known example of that is Santorini in the archipelago of the Cyclades in Greeces. Fira, the main town of the island, lies on the rim of the caldera which is around 300 metres above the sea and drops below it for another 200 metres.
