= Ahrenshoop =

Place in Mecklenburg-Vorpommern, Germany

- Municipality
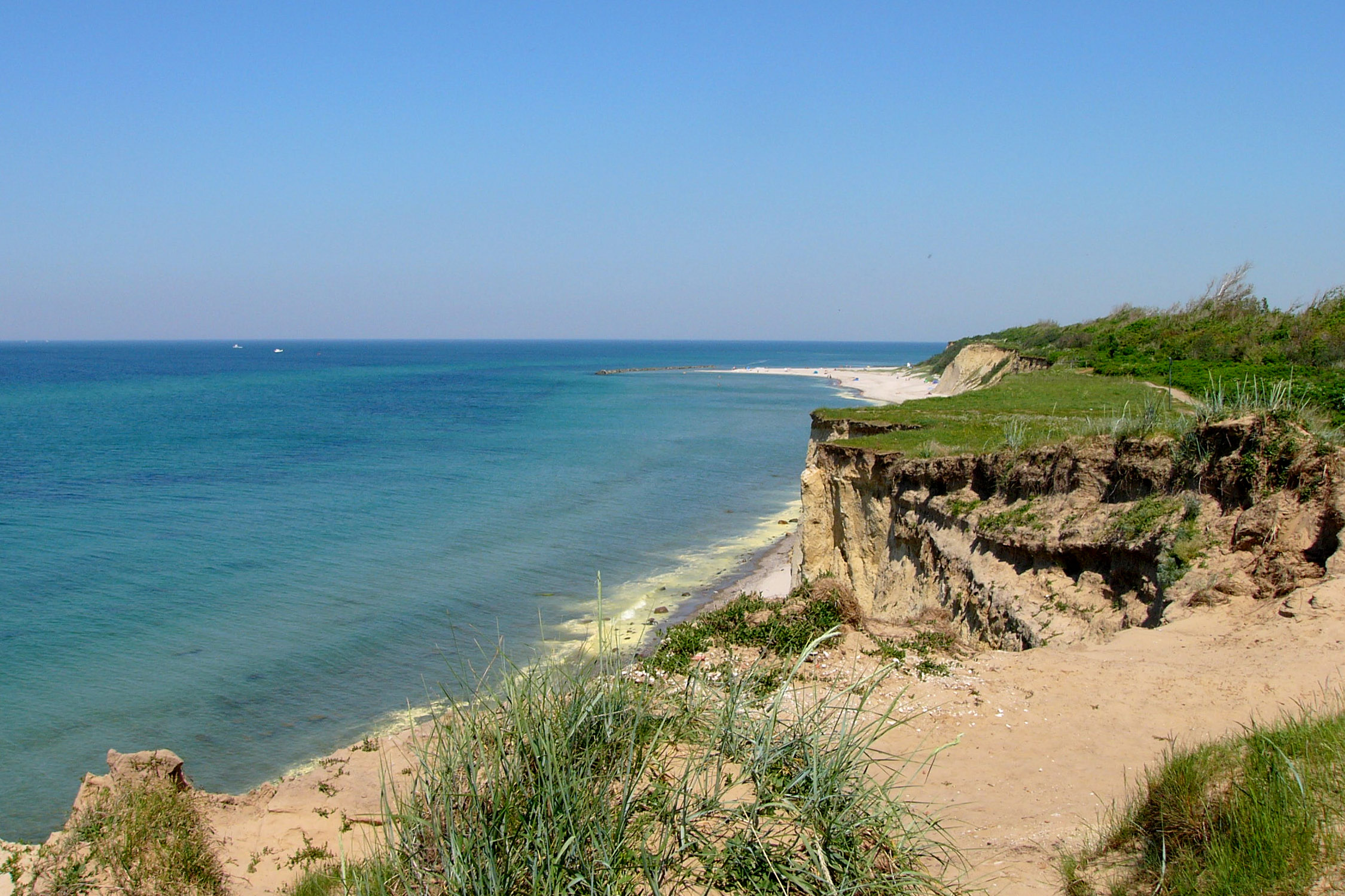

- Location of Ahrenshoop within Vorpommern-Rügen district
- Interactive map of Ahrenshoop
- Location within Germany Location within Mecklenburg-Vorpommern
- Coordinates: 54°22′53″N 12°25′12″E
- Country: Germany
- State: Mecklenburg-Vorpommern
- District: Vorpommern-Rügen
- Municipal assoc.: Darß/Fischland

Government
  - Mayor (2019–24): Benjamin Heinke (CDU)

Area
  - Total: 5.27 km^{2} (2.03 sq mi)
- Elevation: 3 m (9.8 ft)

Population (2025-12-31)
  - Total: 642
  - Density: 122/km^{2} (316/sq mi)
- Time zone: UTC+01:00 (CET)
  - Summer (DST): UTC+02:00 (CEST)
- Postal codes: 18347
- Dialling codes: 038220
- Vehicle registration: VR, NVP
- Website: www.ostseebad-ahrenshoop.de

Ahrenshoop (German pronunciation: [ˈaːʁənsˌhoːp]) is a municipality in the Vorpommern-Rügen district, in Mecklenburg-Vorpommern, Germany on the Fischland-Darß-Zingst peninsula of the Baltic Sea. It used to be a small fishing village, but is today known for its tourism and as a holiday resort.

== History ==
=== Early history ===
Ahrenshoop was first mentioned in 1311 as the defining point of the border of the town of Ribnitz's property. In 1328 Duke Heinrich II of Mecklenburg donated the area east of this border to the monastery of Ribnitz. In 1395 forces of the City of Rostock destroyed a stronghold, built by Bogislaw VI. of Pomerania, and the harbour of Ahrenshoop. In 1591 the border between Mecklenburg and Pomerania was defined, which runs through the village, still existing today as the "Grenzweg" (border road). After the Treaty of Westphalia in 1648 the Eastern part of the village became part of Swedish Pomerania until 1815, when Sweden ceded Pomerania to Prussia. Until the Grand Duchy of Mecklenburg-Schwerin joined the German Zollverein in 1868 one had to pay taxes crossing this border. Most of the inhabitants were fishermen or sailors at that time.

=== Modern times ===
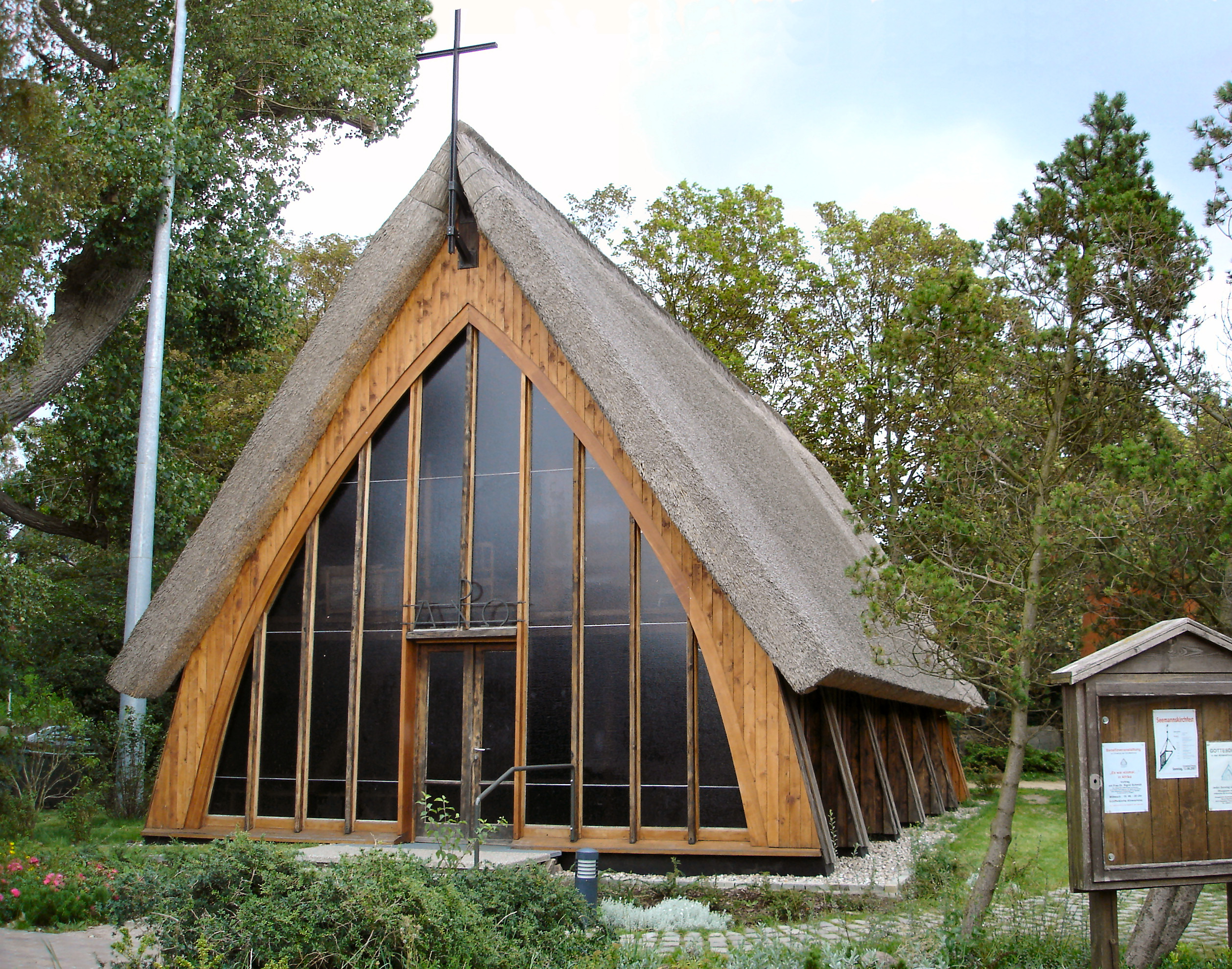
Schifferkirche Evangelical Skipper's Church

In 1889 the artist painters Paul Müller-Kaempff and Oskar Frenzel "discovered" the village, deeply impressed by the landscape and started an artist colony which became increasingly popular among artists such as Marianne von Werefkin, Erich Heckel and Gerhard Marcks. The first generation of members of the artist colony included the painters Elisabeth von Eicken, Anna Gerresheim, Friedrich Wachenhusen and, among others, as a guest Karl Rettich. In 1894 Ahrenshoop counted 150 tourists, a number growing to 2158 in 1928. Several artists of the second generation also lived in Althagen and Niehagen, small villages on the Mecklenburg side of the border, among them Gerhard Marcks in Niehagen or Dora Koch-Stetter and her husband Fritz Koch-Gotha in Althagen. These villages have been part of Ahrenshoop since 1950. Today Ahrenshoop is known as an "Artist Spa" and a popular place for artists and celebrities.
