= Wustrow (Fischland) =

- Municipality
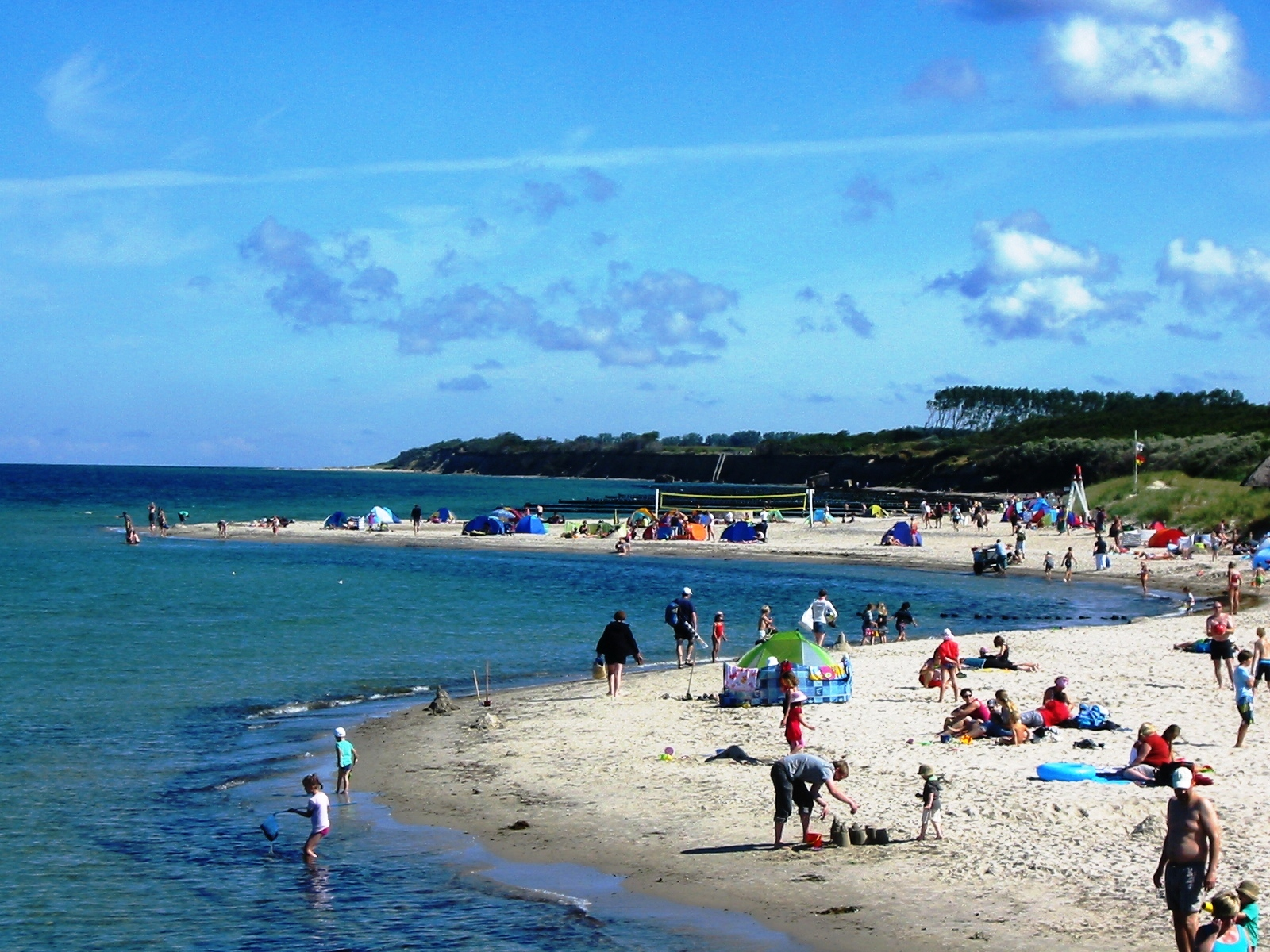
- Beach of Wustrow on the Fischland peninsula

- Coat of arms

- Location of Wustrow within Vorpommern-Rügen district
- Interactive map of Wustrow
- Location within Germany Location within Mecklenburg-Vorpommern
- Coordinates: 54°21′N 12°24′E
- Country: Germany
- State: Mecklenburg-Vorpommern
- District: Vorpommern-Rügen
- Municipal assoc.: Darß/Fischland

Government
  - Mayor: Daniel Schimmelpfennig (Ind.)

Area
  - Total: 6.88 km^{2} (2.66 sq mi)
- Elevation: 2 m (6.6 ft)

Population (2025-12-31)
  - Total: 1,134
  - Density: 165/km^{2} (427/sq mi)
- Time zone: UTC+01:00 (CET)
  - Summer (DST): UTC+02:00 (CEST)
- Postal codes: 18347
- Dialling codes: 038220
- Vehicle registration: NVP
- Website: www.ostseebad-wustrow.de

Wustrow (German pronunciation: [ˈvʊstʁoː]) is a municipality in the Vorpommern-Rügen district, in Mecklenburg-Vorpommern, Germany.

The first industrial wind turbine, a Vestas V25-200 kW wind turbine with a nacelle height of 28.5 metres and a rotor diameter of 25 metres, is situated there .

== Notable residents ==
- Klaus Praefcke (1933–2013), chemist
- Uwe Stock (* 1947), judoka
