= 1872 Baltic Sea flood =

Sea flood in Europe

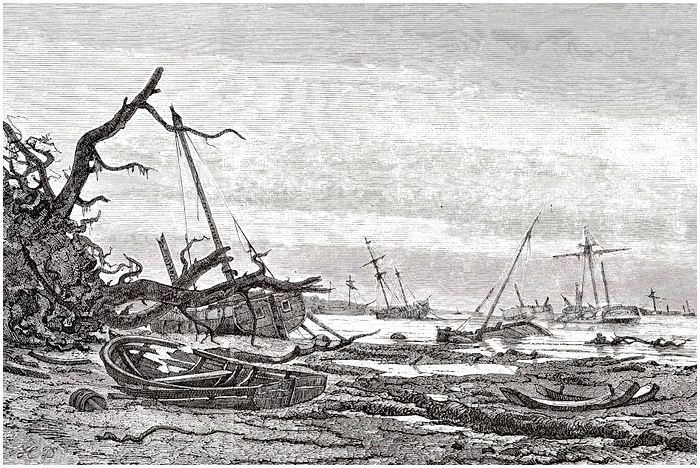
The destructions created by the 1872 Baltic sea flood in the area between Præstø and Faxe as depicted by Holger Drachmann as reporter for Illustreret Tidende (December 8, 1872)

The 1872 Baltic Sea flood (German: Ostseesturmhochwasser 1872), often referred to as a storm flood, ravaged the Baltic Sea coast from Denmark to Pomerania, also affecting Sweden, during the night between 12 and 13 November 1872 and was, until then, the worst storm surge in the Baltic. The highest recorded peak water level was about 3.3 m above sea level (NN).

== Course ==
In the days before the storm tide, a storm blew from the southwest across the Baltic that drove the sea towards Finland and Balticum. The result was flooding there and extreme low water levels on the Danish-German coastlines. As a result, large quantities of water were able to flow into the western Baltic from the North Sea. The storm increased in strength, and changed direction. The winds now blew from the northeast, and drove the water masses back in a south-westerly direction. Because the water could only flow slowly back into the North Sea, huge waves caught coastal dwellers by surprise on the morning of 13 November 1872 and caused floods over a metre high in coastal towns and villages.

== Short-term impact ==
Of all the German coastal settlements, Eckernförde was most heavily damaged due to its location on the Bay of Eckernförde which was wide open to the northeast. The entire town was flooded, 78 houses were destroyed, 138 damaged and 112 families became homeless. In Mecklenburg and West Pomerania 32 people lost their lives on land due to the floods. The Danish island of Lolland, which still has areas enclosed by dykes today that lie below sea level, was badly hit. In the Greifswald village of Wieck almost all the buildings were destroyed and nine people drowned. Houses were rubbled as far as the centre of Greifswald. Peenemünde was completely swamped. On Falster 52 died; on Lolland 28.

In all the flood cost the lives of at least 271 people on the Baltic Sea coast; 2,850 houses were destroyed or at least badly damaged and 15,160 people left homeless as a result.

== Long-term impact ==
As a result of this disaster, which also flooded large parts of Prerow on the Darß, the Prerower Strom, which had hitherto separated the island of Zingst from Darß, silted up. In 1874, the Prerow-Strom was finally filled in and protected with a dyke; Zingst thus became a peninsula.

The Koserower Damerow was destroyed and the island of Usedom near Koserow split in two. Following a further flood in February 1874, in which the remains of the buildings were destroyed and a layer of sand up to 60 cm thick left behind, Damerow was abandoned.

== In culture ==
The flood is referenced in the 1877 novel The Breaking of the Storm by Friedrich Spielhagen, where a parallel is made between the natural disaster of the flood and the stock market crash of 1873.

== Individual high water marks ==
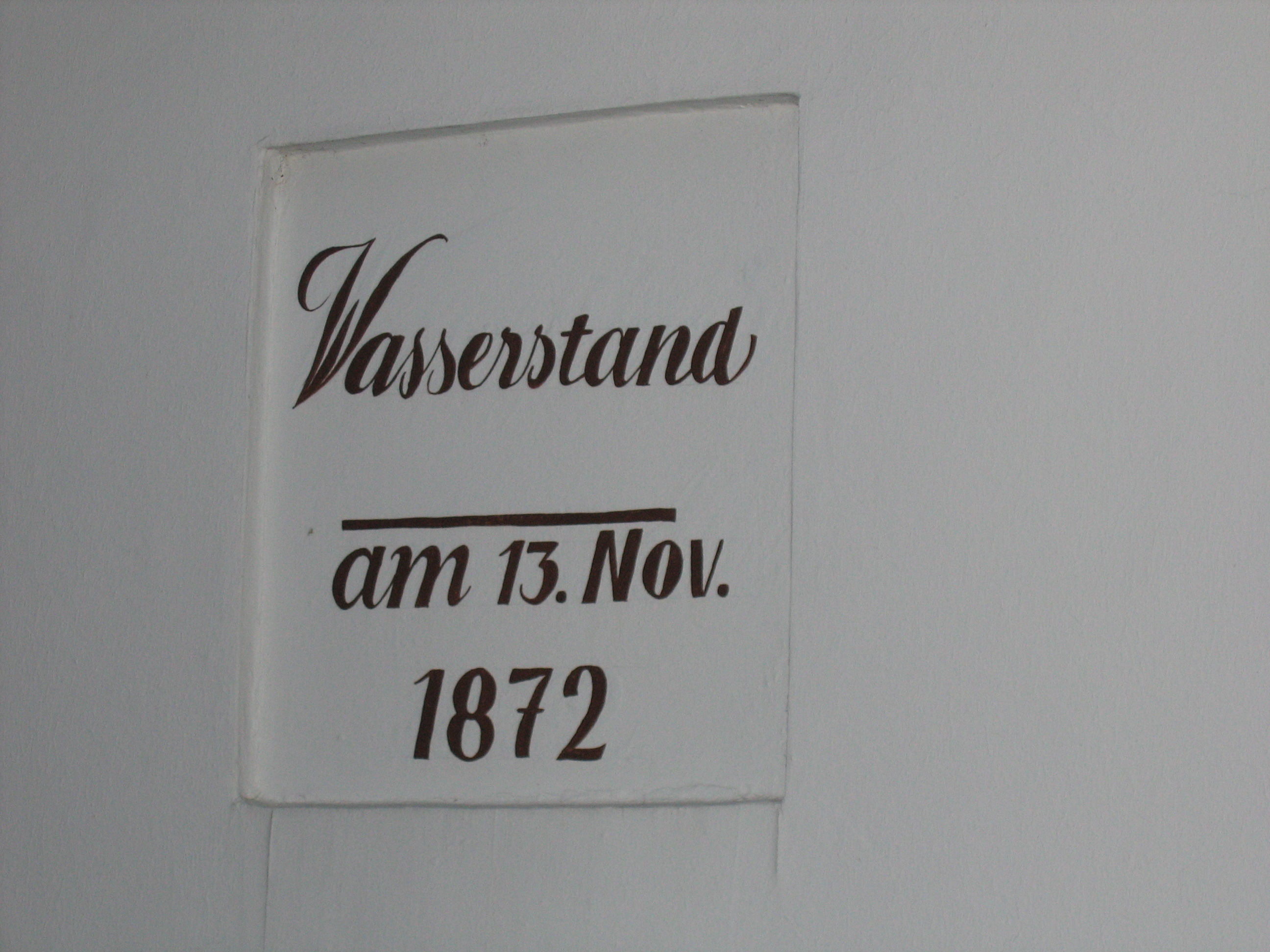
High-water marks
in Dahme/Baltic Sea

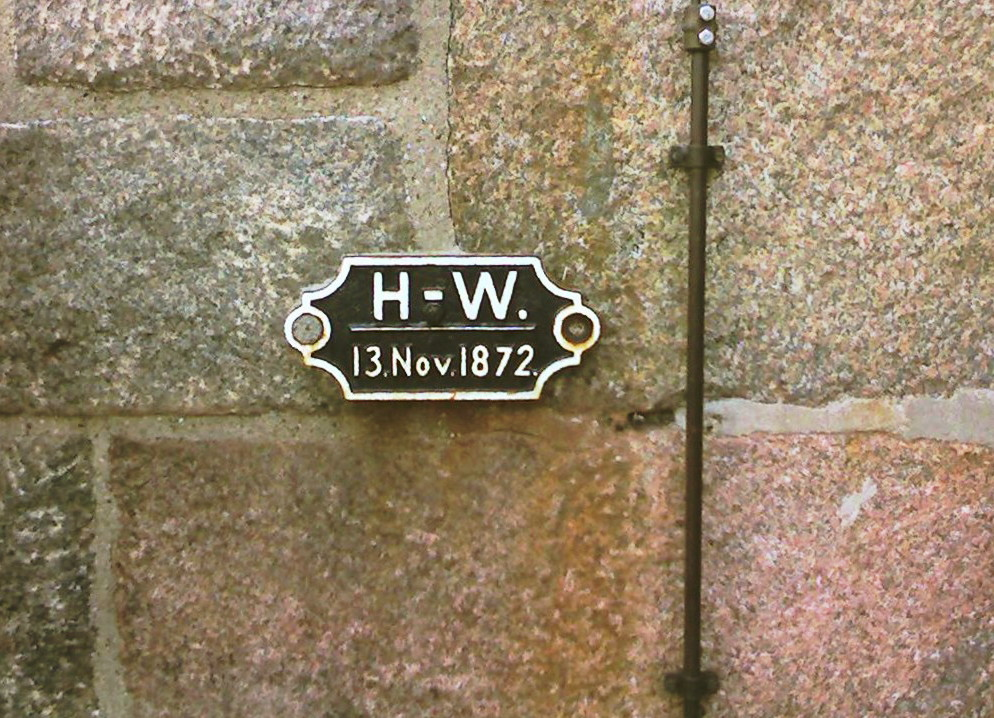
High-water mark
on the old
Travemünde Lighthouse

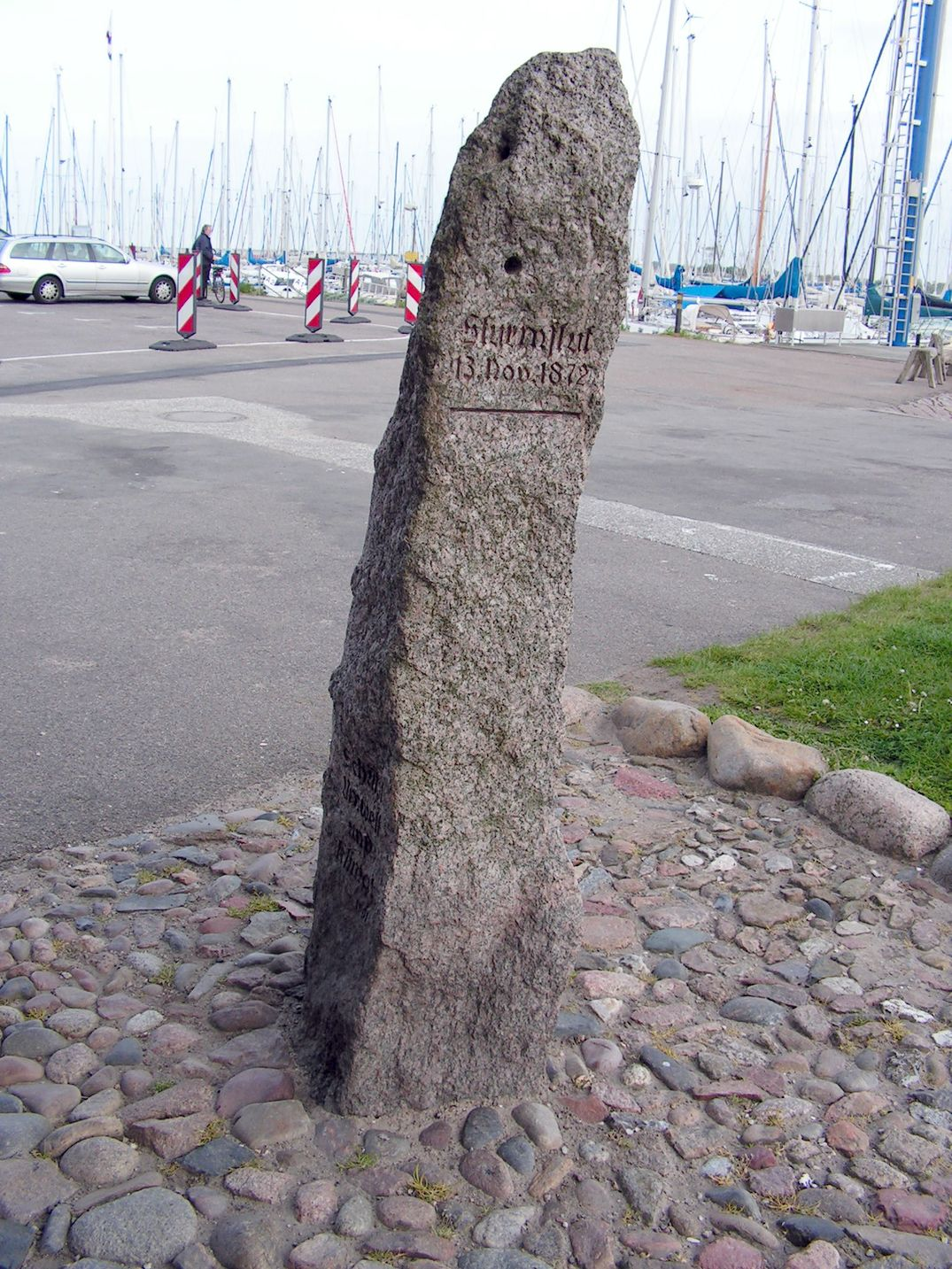
High-water mark
Maasholm (Schlei) harbour

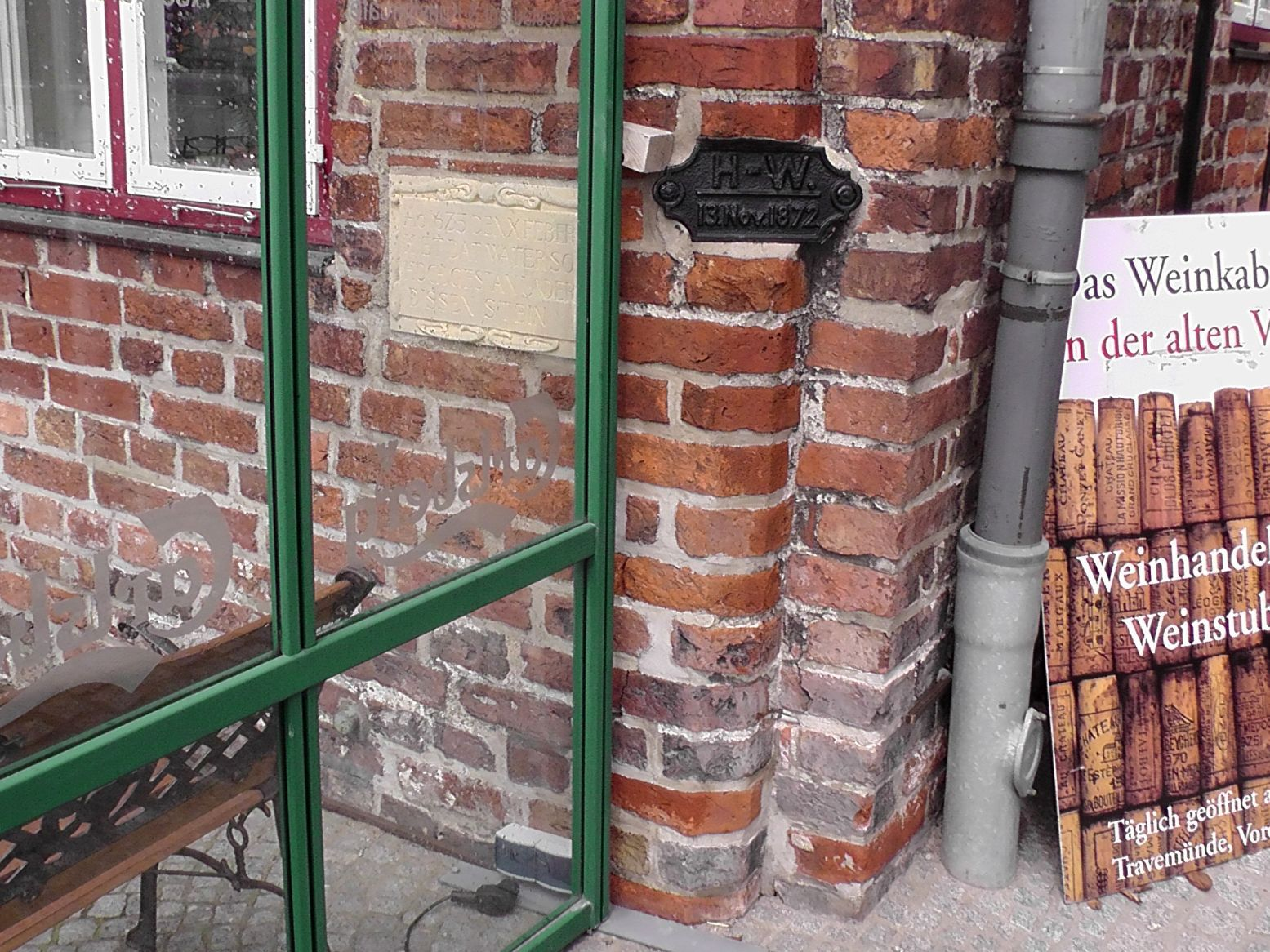
High-water marks
from 1625 and 1872
Travemünde
Alte Vogtei
