= Kreeft =

Kreeft is a surname. Notable people with the surname include:

- Charles Kreeft (1859–1924), New Zealand cricketer
- Peter John Kreeft (born 1937), American philosopher
- Peter Kreeft (diver) (1739–1811), German inventor and diver
