= Darß Forest =

Coordinates: 54.43012°N 12.51343°E

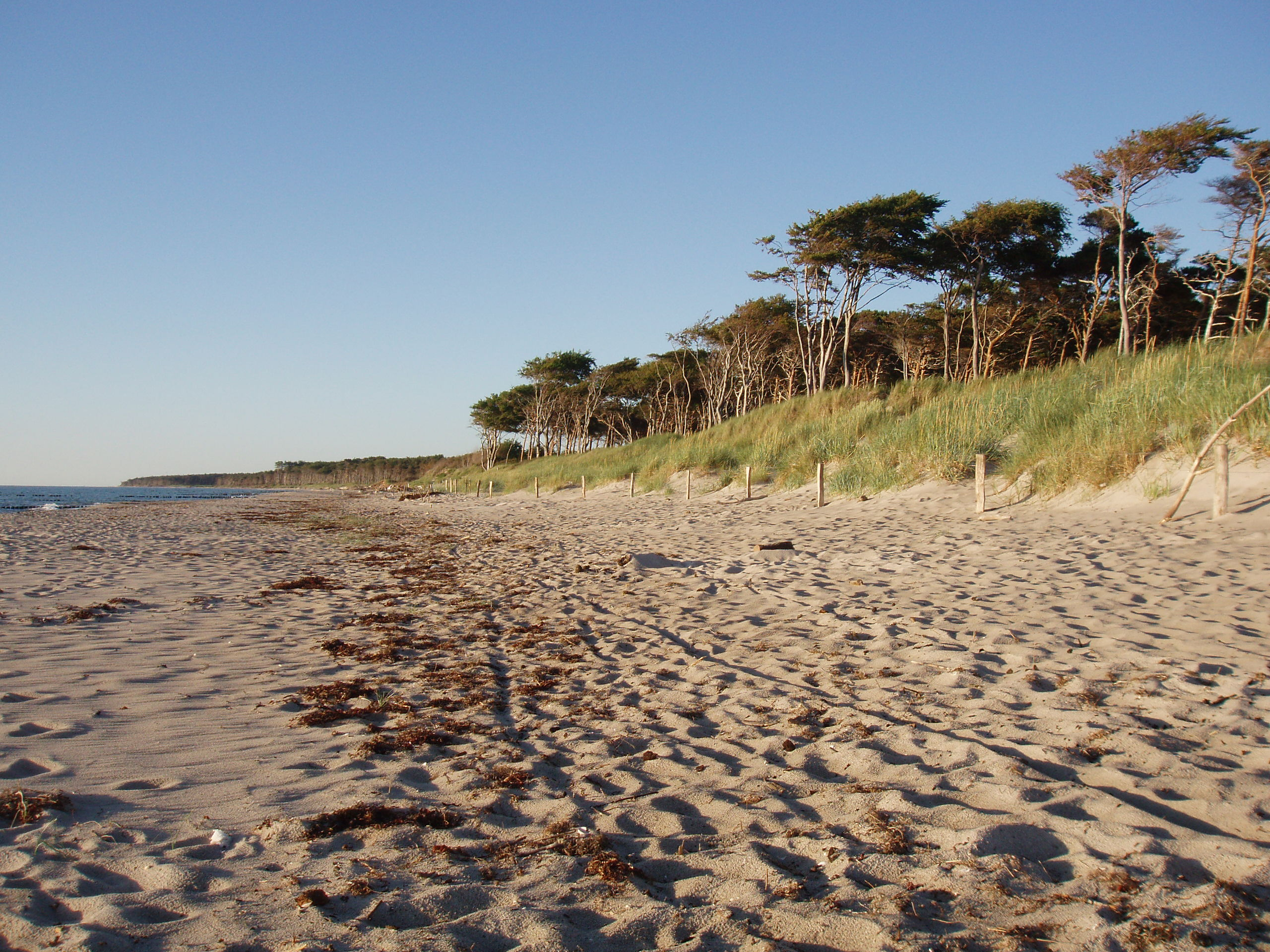
The Darß Forest on the western coast

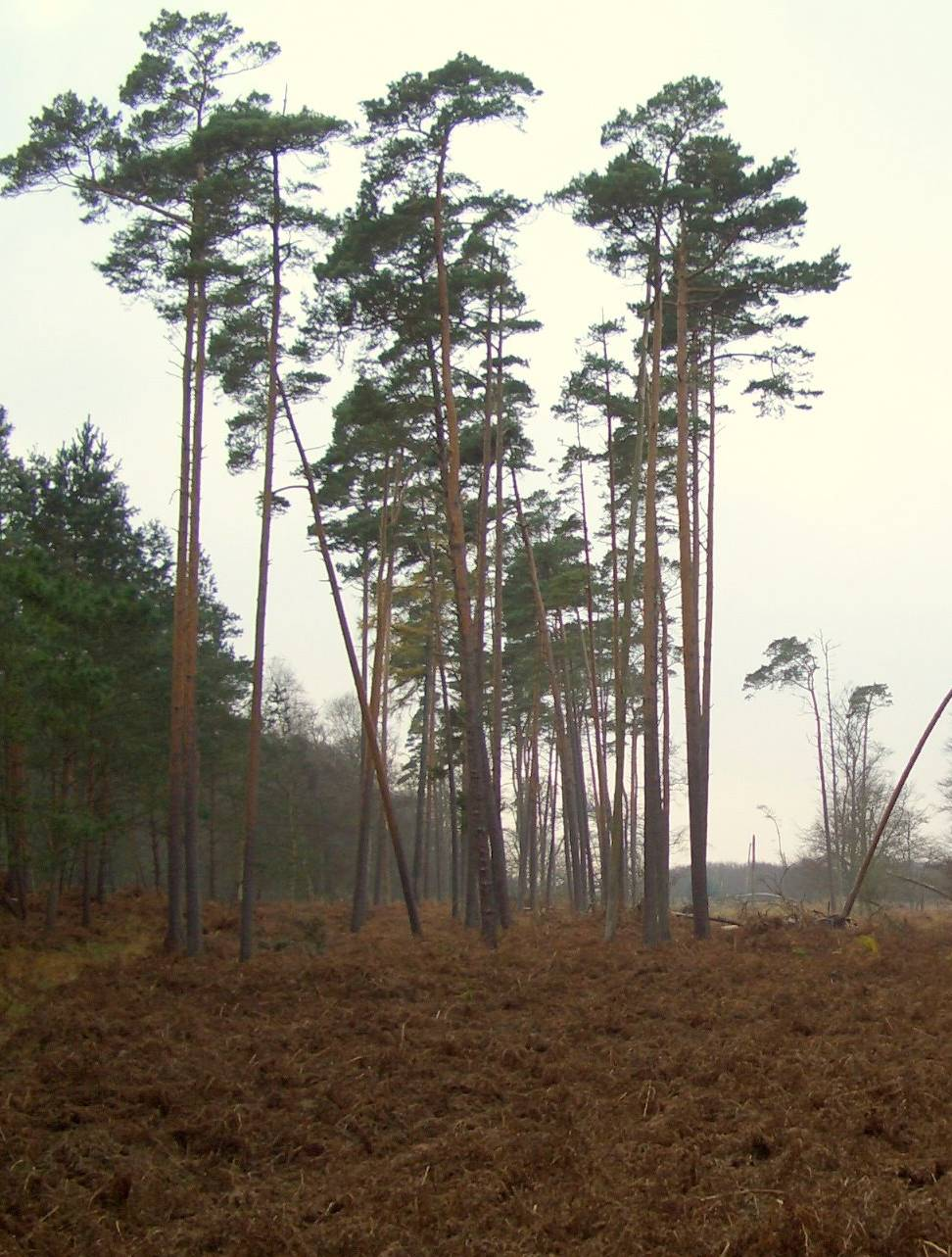
Ground-covering bracken

The Darß Forest (pronounced "Darss", German: Darßwald) is a wooded region on the western coast of the peninsula of Darß on Germany's Baltic coast. There are no settlements in the forest. Villages on the outskirts are Ahrenshoop and Born in the south and Wieck and Prerow in the east. The Darß Forest covers an area of 5,800 hectares and is part of the Western Pomeranian Lagoon Region National Park. The area around Darßer Ort and the northwestern part of the forest belong to conservation zone 1. Here, the land may not be used for human exploitation and the aim is to allow the areas to develop naturally.

== History ==
This area was formed during the development of a graded shoreline from rows of beach berms, which are recognisable today as a system of embankments (locally known as Reff) and damp depressions (Riegen). Three thousand years ago the sea level was higher, so that old cliffed coastlines like the Alte Meerufer ("Old Seashore") may be found within the Darß Forest itself.

In the past, much of the area covered today by the Darß Forest comprised pastureland. Oddly formed beech trees are evidence of that. The periods of occupation of Pomerania by Danes and French led to deforesting in the Darß Forest. The wood of felled yew trees was used, for example, to line the interior of the Danish palaces of Amalienborg and Rosenborg. Prussian foresters reforested the areas affected with fast-growing softwoods such as spruce, larch and Douglas fir. Much later, the pines were tapped for resin during GDR times.

During the Middle Ages, the Darß Forest was used by the Pomeranian dukes as a hunting ground. Subsequently, the forest became a state hunting ground by the Swedish king in the 19th century, by Hermann Göring in the 20th century, and by hunters of the SED leadership during GDR times. The result was and is an unusually high level of game, especially Red Deer and Roe Deer. A bison population was established in the 1930s but died out in 1945.

The ridges and troughs (Reffen and Riegen) of the Darß Forest run predominantly from east to west. The tree species of the higher ridges are Scots Pine, English Oak and Common Beech. The lower-lying troughs are covered with Alder. Bracken covers much of the ground and, together with the high density of game, prevents the natural rejuvenation of the tree population.
