= Peter Kreeft (disambiguation) =

Peter Kreeft may refer to:

- Peter John Kreeft (born 1937), American philosopher
- Peter Kreeft (diver) (1739–1811), German inventor and diver
