= Rainer Borriss =

German microbiologist

- Born: April 30, 1945 (age 81); Prerow, Mecklenburg, Germany
- Citizenship: German
- Education: Martin Luther University Halle-Wittenberg
- Known for: Bacillus enzymes; Bacillus subtilis genome project; Bacillus velezensis FZB42
- Awards: National Prize of the GDR in Science and Technology (1986)
- Scientific career
- Fields: Microbiology, bacterial genetics
- Workplaces: Humboldt University of Berlin

Rainer Borriss (born 30 April 1945) is a German microbiologist and professor emeritus at Humboldt University of Berlin. His research has focused on Bacillus enzymes, Bacillus subtilis genome sequencing project, and the characterization of Bacillus velezensis FZB42 as a model Gram-positive plant-beneficial bacterium. He held the chair for Bacterial Genetics at Humboldt University from 1992 to 2010 and co-founded the biotechnology company ABiTEP GmbH in 2005.

As of April 2026, Borriss has an h-index of 74 and more than 23,000 citations according to Google Scholar.

== Early life and education ==
Borriss was born in Prerow, Mecklenburg, Germany. He studied biology at Martin Luther University Halle-Wittenberg from 1964 to 1971.

He received his Diploma in Biology in 1971 and his doctorate (Dr. rer. nat.) in 1972.

== Career ==
From 1971 to 1981, Borriss directed microbiological laboratories at PROWIKO in Schönebeck/Elbe, where work was carried out on the development of microbial β-glucanase as a substitute for malt in East German brewing.

Borriss joined Humboldt University of Berlin in 1989 and was appointed Professor of Bacterial Genetics in 1992, serving until 2010. He was deputy director of the Institute of Biology from 2000 to 2001. Since 2010, he has held the title of professor emeritus at Humboldt University.

== Research ==
=== β-Glucanase enzymology ===
Borriss's early research focused on bacterial β-glucanases. In collaboration with Jürgen Hofemeister, he cloned and sequenced Bacillus β-glucanase genes. At the Carlsberg Research Laboratory, he contributed to the development of thermostable hybrid β-glucanases. Structural studies with Udo Heinemann led to the characterization of enzyme structures including GluXyn-1.

=== Bacillus subtilis genome project ===
Borriss participated in the international sequencing of the Bacillus subtilis genome. His group contributed a chromosomal region involved in purine metabolism.

=== Plant growth promotion and biocontrol ===
From the 2000s, Borriss focused on plant growth-promoting bacteria. His group sequenced the genome of Bacillus amyloliquefaciens FZB42. He identified gene clusters responsible for antimicrobial metabolites including lipopeptides, polyketides, and bacilysin. His research also demonstrated the role of indole-3-acetic acid (IAA) in plant growth promotion. In 2017, he contributed to taxonomic clarification within the Bacillus subtilis species complex.

== Awards ==
- 1986 – National Prize of the GDR in Science and Technology

== Selected publications ==
- Kunst, F.; Ogasawara, N.; Moszer, I.; Albertini, A.M.; Alloni, G.; Azevedo, V.; Borriss, R.; Danchin, A. (1997). "The complete genome sequence of the Gram-positive bacterium Bacillus subtilis". Nature. 390 (6657): 249–256. Bibcode:1997Natur.390..249K. doi:10.1038/36786. hdl:11370/bc37dcc3-9480-4e9b-8a57-8fb4aa24c4b4. PMID 9384377.
- Chen, X.H.; Koumoutsi, A.; Scholz, R.; Eisenreich, A.; Schneider, K.; Heinemeyer, I.; Borriss, R. (2007). "Comparative analysis of the complete genome sequence of the plant growth-promoting bacterium Bacillus amyloliquefaciens FZB42". Nature Biotechnology. 25 (9): 1007–1014. doi:10.1038/nbt1325. PMID 17704766.
- Koumoutsi, A.; Chen, X.H.; Henne, A.; Liesegang, H.; Hitzeroth, G.; Franke, P.; Vater, J.; Borriss, R. (2004). "Structural and functional characterisation of gene clusters directing nonribosomal synthesis of bioactive cyclic lipopeptides in Bacillus amyloliquefaciens strain FZB42". Journal of Bacteriology. 186 (4): 1084–1096. doi:10.1128/JB.186.4.1084-1096.2004. PMC 344220. PMID 14762003.
