= Peter Kreeft (diver) =

German inventor and diver

Peter Kreeft (born 1739 in Wieck auf dem Darß died 20 January 1811 in Barth) also spelled Kraeft or Kreft, was a German sea captain, shipping correspondent, ship owner and merchant in Barth, Swedish Pomerania, who invented an early version of a surface-supplied diving suit with helmet.

== Life and work ==
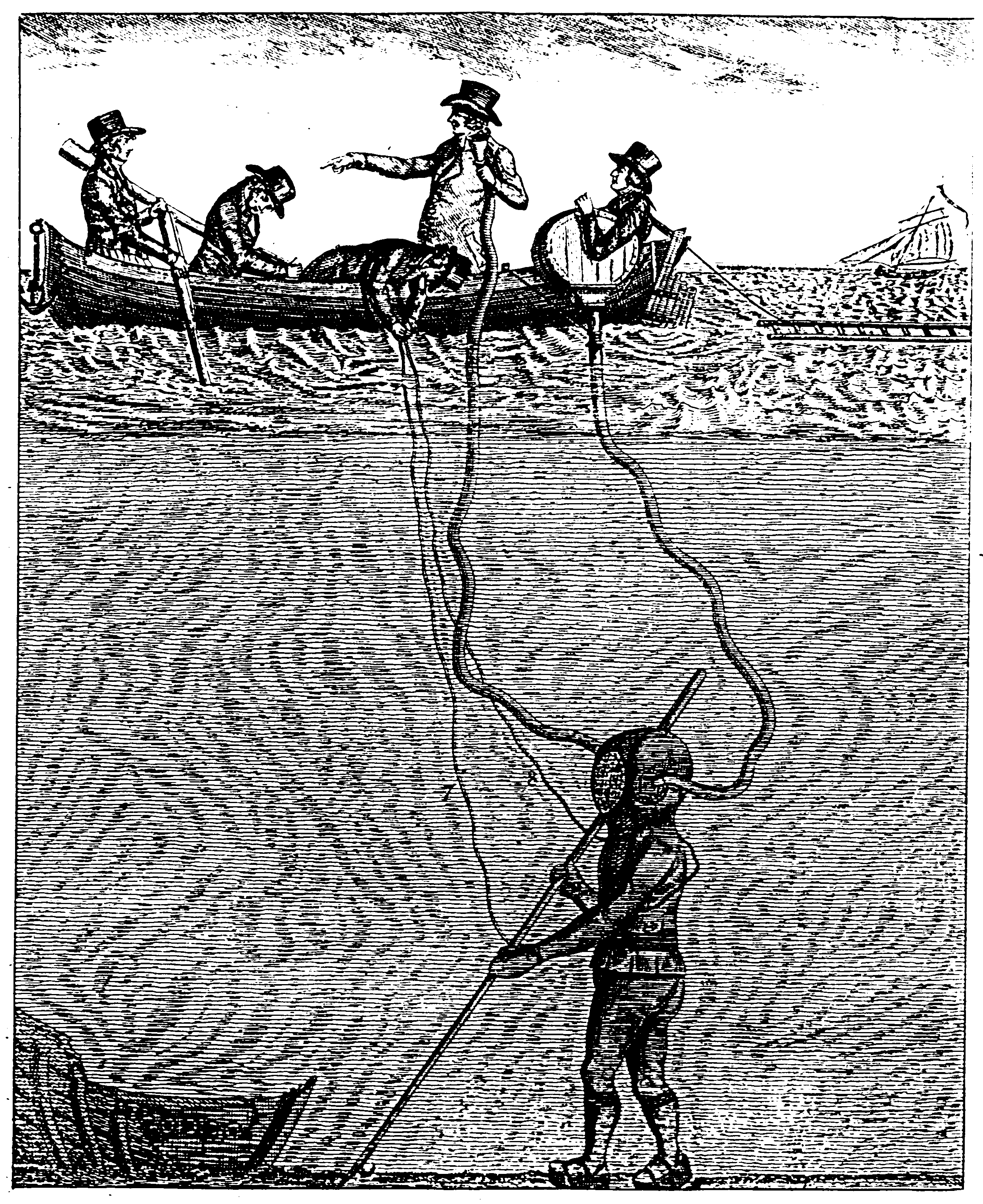
Illustration of the Kreeft diving suit

The invention of the surface supplied helmet diving suit was a major development in underwater diving. A document from 1805 found by the diving historian Michael Jung in 1996 shows that the shipowner and captain Peter Kreeft had significant influence on the development of the diving helmet with his invention of a Tauchermaschine [diving machine] in 1800. The document describes the invention of diving equipment, which was already close to the standard diving dress, and which was successfully used in the Baltic Sea. Kreeft also anticipated other developments, such as a voice communications system between the diver and the surface support team.

Peter Kreeft was probably the owner of the frigate Die Gewisheit (built in Rostock 1769) and the Peter Kreft (built in Prerow 1780). He lived in Barth, Markt 12, in a house that still stands as of 2019. Between 18 and 23 July 1800 he presented his diving suit to King Gustav IV Adolf of Sweden in Stralsund.

Peter Kreeft's son Christoph Kreeft, and his grandson Siegerich Christoph Kreeft, served as Consuls General in London.

== Sources ==
- Jens Peter Clausen: Die Lebensdaten des Tauchpioniers Peter Kraeft (Peter Kreeft). [The life data of the diving pioneer Peter Kraeft], 2010 digitized version
- Michael Jung: Meeresgrundwanderer. Der vergessene Tauchpionier Peter Kreeft aus Barth. Kückenshagen [Seabed hikers. The forgotten diving pioneer Peter Kreeft from Barth. Kückenshagen] 1997. ISBN 3-929370-65-4.
