= Darß/Fischland =

- Amt
- Location of Darß/Fischland within Vorpommern-Rügen district
- Interactive map of Darß/Fischland
- Location within Germany Location within Mecklenburg-Vorpommern
- Coordinates: 54°23′N 12°32′E
- Country: Germany
- State: Mecklenburg-Vorpommern
- District: Vorpommern-Rügen
- Seat: Born
- Subdivisions: 6 municipalities

Area
  - Total: 123.65 km^{2} (47.74 sq mi)

Population (2025-12-31)
  - Total: 6,313
  - Density: 51.06/km^{2} (132.2/sq mi)
- Time zone: UTC+01:00 (CET)
  - Summer (DST): UTC+02:00 (CEST)
- Website: www.darss-fischland.de

Darß/Fischland is an Amt in the district of Vorpommern-Rügen, in Mecklenburg-Vorpommern, Germany. The seat of the Amt is in Born.

The Amt Darß/Fischland consists of the following municipalities:

1. Ahrenshoop
2. Born
3. Dierhagen
4. Prerow
5. Wieck am Darß
6. Wustrow
