= Problematic Characters =

1861 novel by Friedrich Spielhagen

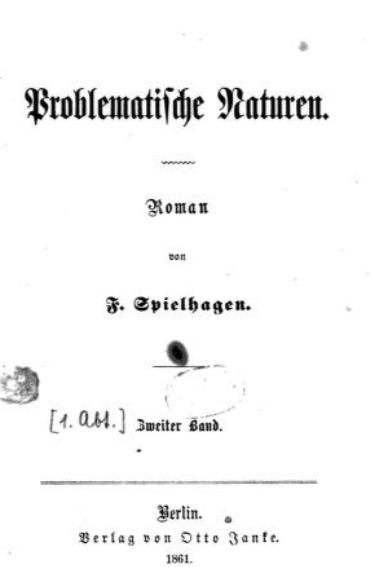
- Title page for Problematische Naturen (1861)
- Author: Friedrich Spielhagen
- Original title: Problematische Naturen
- Translator: Schele de Vere
- Language: German
- Publication date: 1861
- English publication date: 1869

Problematic Characters (German: Problematische Naturen, lit. 'Problematic Natures') is an 1861 novel by the German writer Friedrich Spielhagen exploring German personalities from around the time of the Revolutions of 1848. It became popular and was translated into English by Prof. Schele de Vere, New York, 1869.

== Motivations ==
Like Freytag and Paul Heyse, Friedrich Spielhagen was chiefly concerned, in his novels, with defining the warring elements of German character and the opposing springs of German action in the period before and after the revolution of 1848. Like Freytag and Heyse, Spielhagen saw clearly the dangers that threatened the country, politically, religiously and morally from a reactionary aristocracy; like Heyse and unlike Freytag he saw the hope of the nation in the spread of an enlightened democracy rather than in a spiritual renaissance of the ruling classes.

== Description ==
The hero of Problematische Naturen, Oswald Stein, is the mouthpiece for Spielhagen's revolutionary social theories. He is modeled after those characters of whom Goethe wrote “There are problematical natures that do not fit into any situation and who remain always unsatisfied. For them there arises a terrible conflict that consumes life without enjoyment.”

For Spielhagen, the conflict itself, even though it ends in defeat, is victory; the struggle against the domination of dead ideas is progress. This philosophy, came to be in the historical background of 1848 Germany and after, out of which Problematische Naturen with its sequel Durch Nacht zum Licht (1862) are apart, which tells the story of the men and women who fought for freedom in Germany's day of hope.
