= Dierhagen =

- Municipality
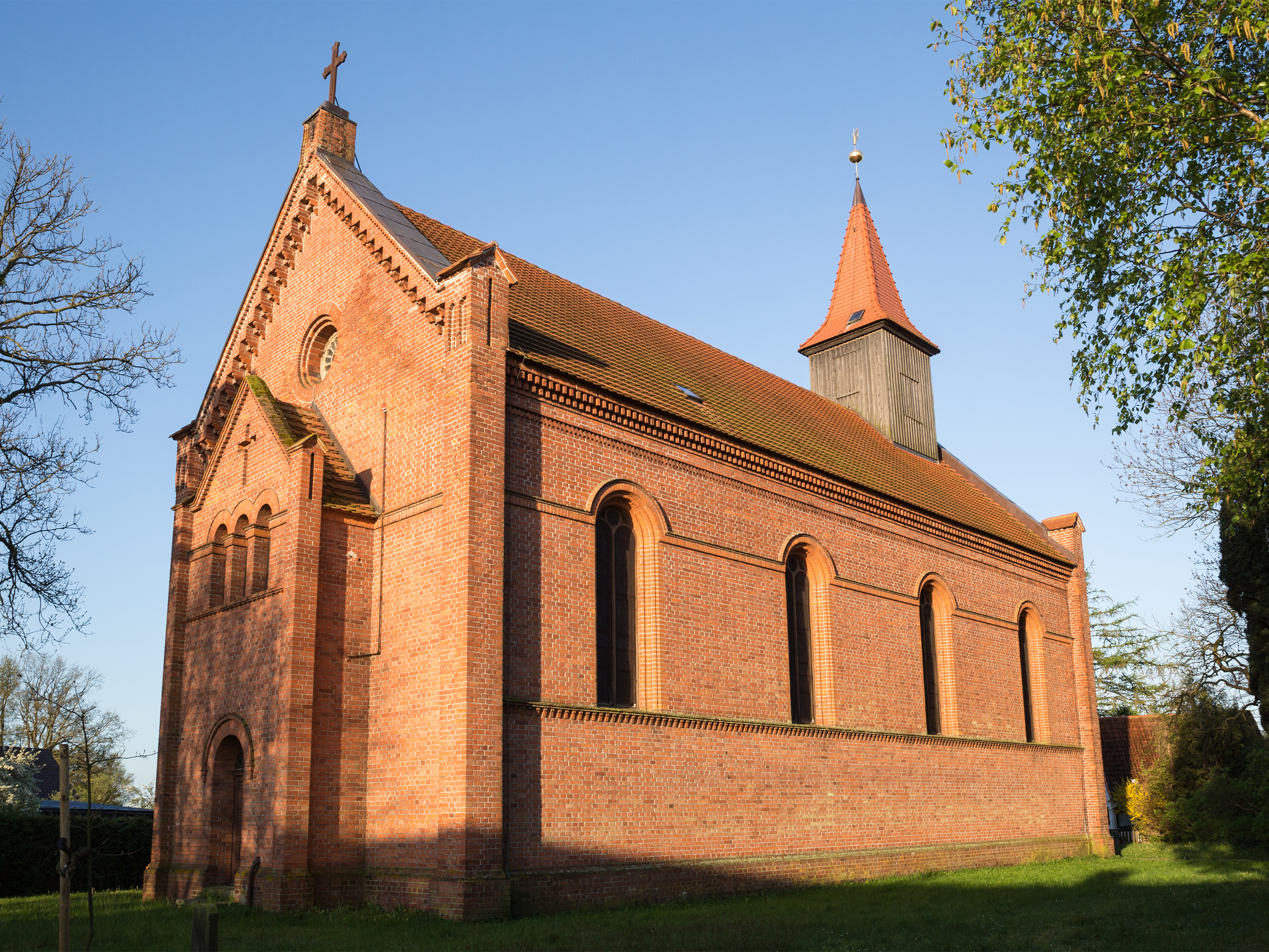
- Protestant church

- Location of Dierhagen within Vorpommern-Rügen district
- Interactive map of Dierhagen
- Location within Germany Location within Mecklenburg-Vorpommern
- Coordinates: 54°17′29″N 12°21′38″E
- Country: Germany
- State: Mecklenburg-Vorpommern
- District: Vorpommern-Rügen
- Municipal assoc.: Darß/Fischland

Government
  - Mayor: Christiane Müller (Left)

Area
  - Total: 27.47 km^{2} (10.61 sq mi)
- Elevation: 3 m (9.8 ft)

Population (2025-12-31)
  - Total: 1,475
  - Density: 53.69/km^{2} (139.1/sq mi)
- Time zone: UTC+01:00 (CET)
  - Summer (DST): UTC+02:00 (CEST)
- Postal codes: 18347
- Dialling codes: 038226
- Vehicle registration: NVP
- Website: www.ostseebad-dierhagen.de

Dierhagen is a municipality in the Vorpommern-Rügen district, in Mecklenburg-Vorpommern, Germany.

== Location ==
Dierhagen is on the Fischland-Darß-Zingst peninsula. The district is surrounded by the Baltic Sea to the north and northwest and the Saaler Bodden to the east and southeast.

Dierhagen has six districts:

- Dierhagen Dorf
- Dierhagen Strand, a 7-km-long beach with fine white sand
- Dierhagen Ost
- Neuhaus
- Dändorf
- Körkwitz

== History ==
Dierhagen was founded in 1311 when German settlers expanded their territory into the area of Ribnitz (moved eastward).

== Notable residents ==
- Egon Krenz, who briefly served as the leader of East Germany in 1989, has lived in the town since 2003.
