= The Breaking of the Storm =

1877 novel by Friedrich Spielhagen

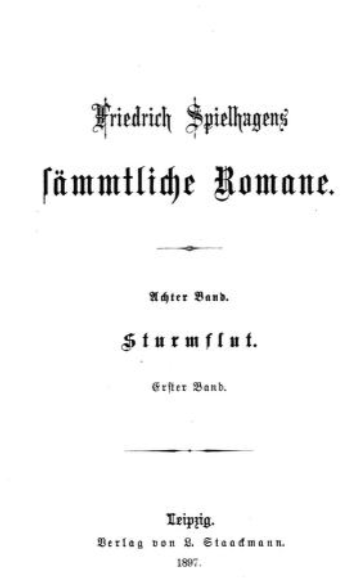
- Title page for Sturmflut (1897
- Author: Friedrich Spielhagen
- Original title: Sturmflut
- Translator: S. E. A. H. Stephenson
- Language: German
- Publisher: Staackmann
- Publication date: 1877
- Publication place: Germany
- English publication date: 1877
- Pages: 1076 (3 volumes)

The Breaking of the Storm (German: Sturmflut) is an 1877 novel by the German writer Friedrich Spielhagen. It is set in the world of German business and follows the flexible middle-class man Reinhold Schmidt as he navigates the contradictions and hazards of the recently unified Germany. The novel is divided into six books and was originally published by Staackmann in three volumes.

The novel deals with themes related to German unification and the tensions between an older generation attached to the liberalism of the 1848 revolutions, represented by Reinhold's uncle, and a younger generation that embraces the Realpolitik of Otto von Bismarck, regarded by the protagonist as a uniquely German fusion of realism and idealism. The title creates a parallel between the 1872 Baltic Sea flood and the 1873 stock market crash. The literary scholar Jeffrey L. Sammons called the book "the major fictional treatment of the financial crash of the 1870s as a harbringer of the predatory but erratic capitalism that was to become characteristic of the Reich".
