= Dändorf =

Coordinates: 54°16′28″N 12°22′14″E

- District
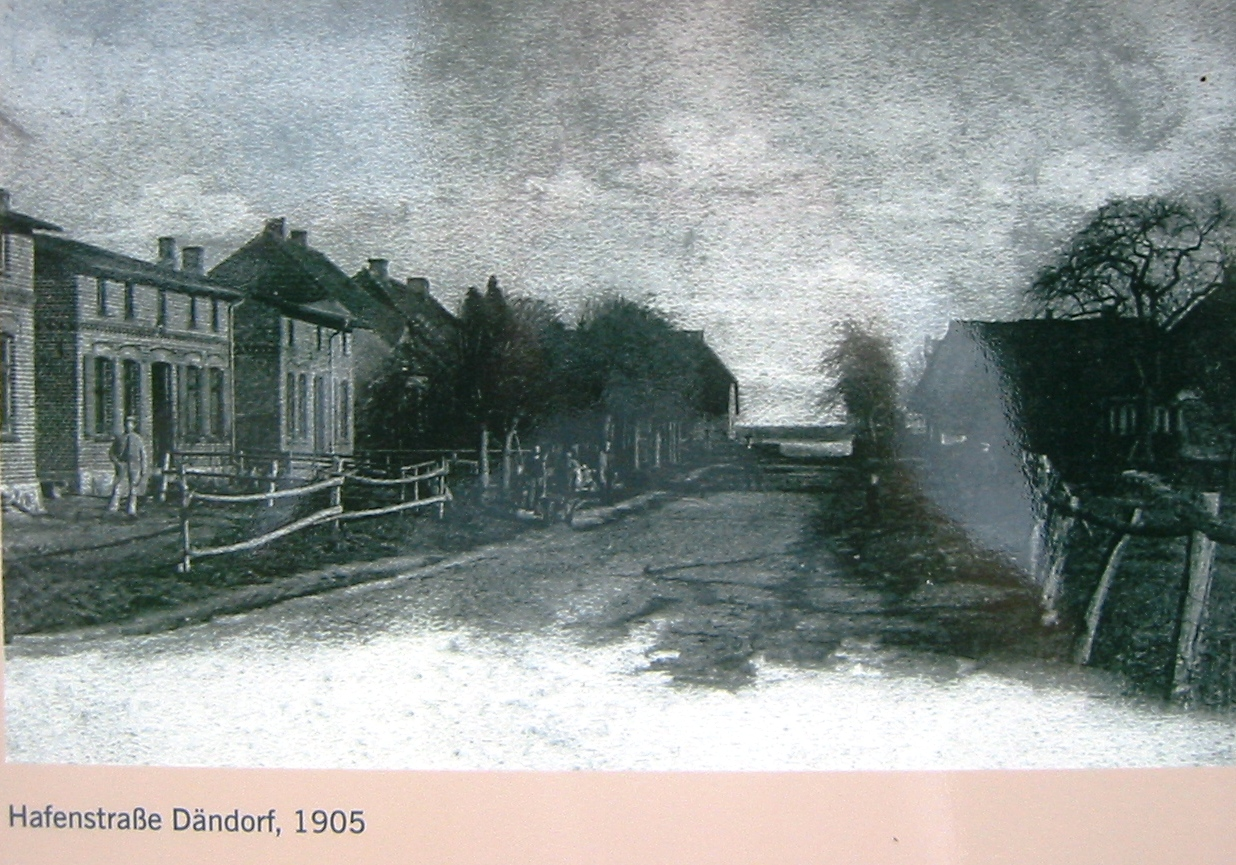
- Harbour Street in Dändorf, 1905
- Interactive map of Dändorf
- Country: Germany
- State: Mecklenburg-Vorpommern
- Municipality: Dierhagen

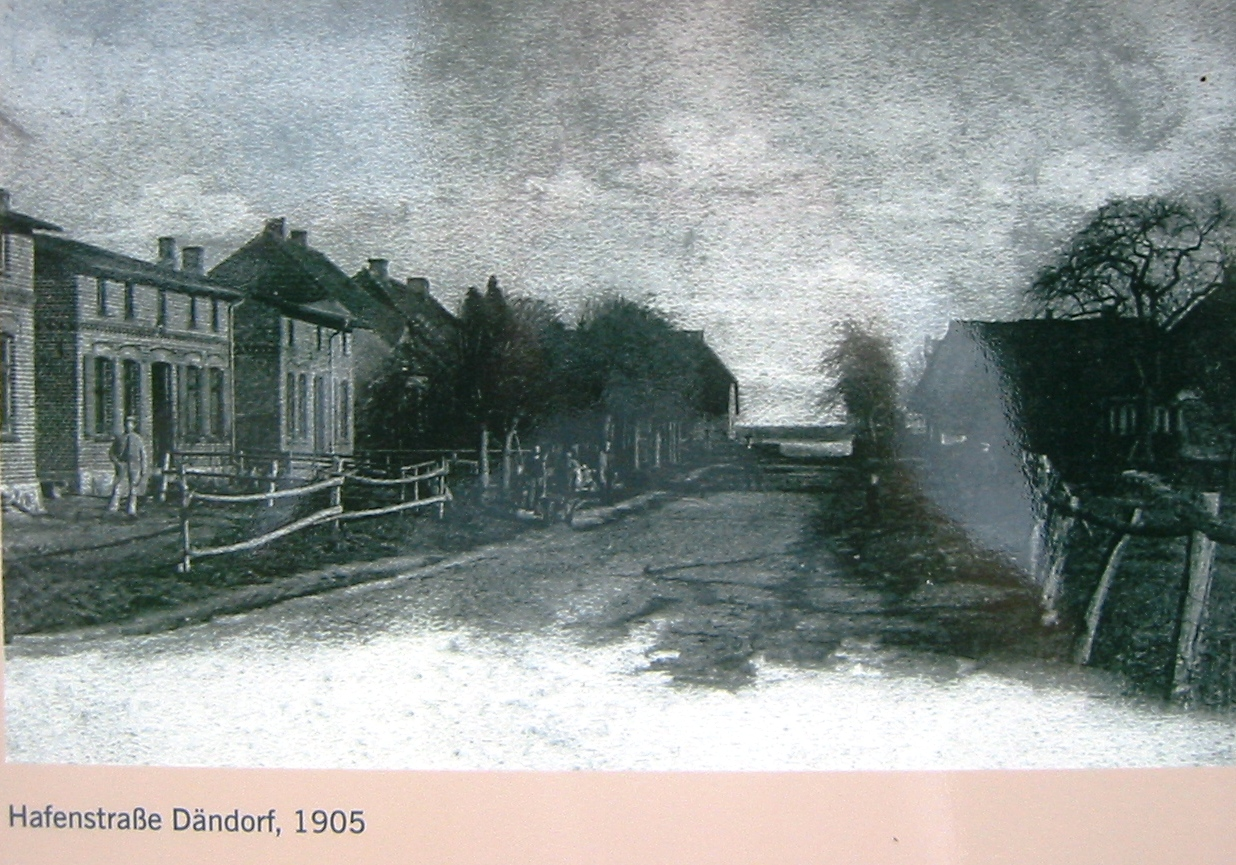
Harbour Street in Dändorf, 1905

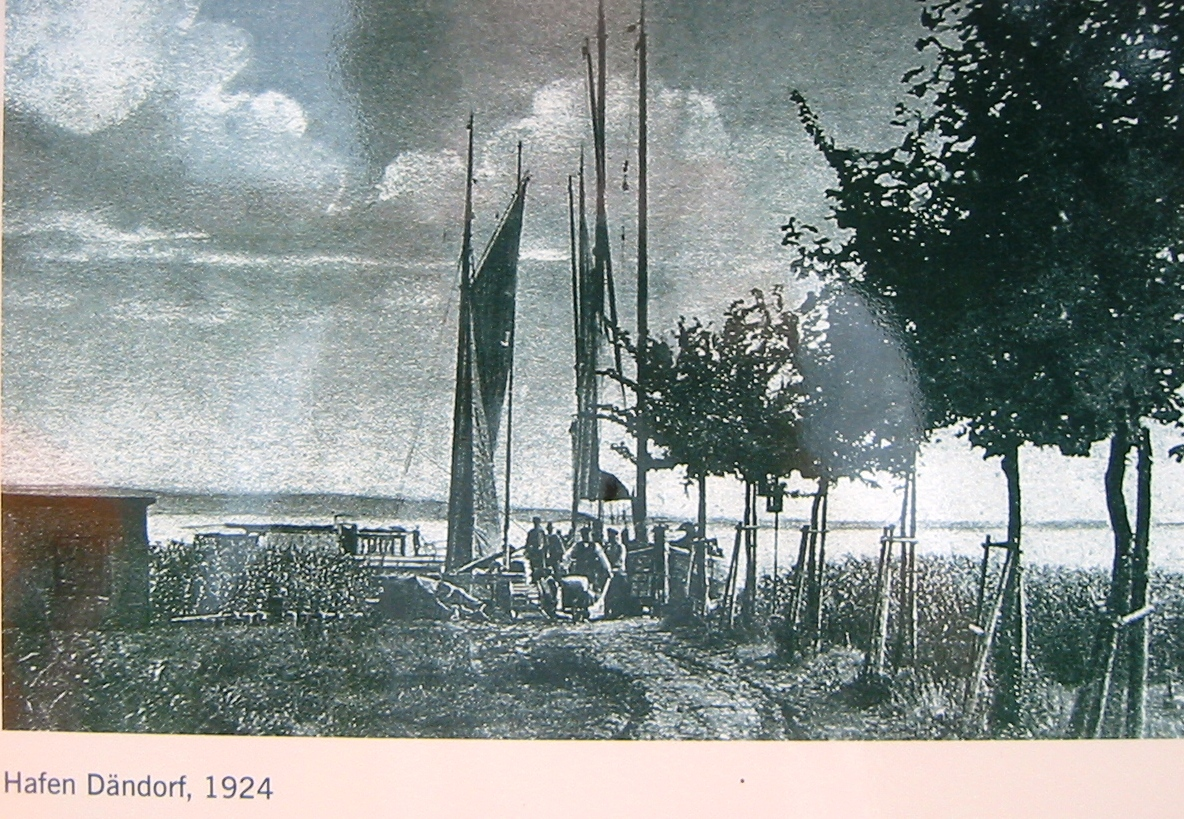
Harbour in Dändorf, 1924

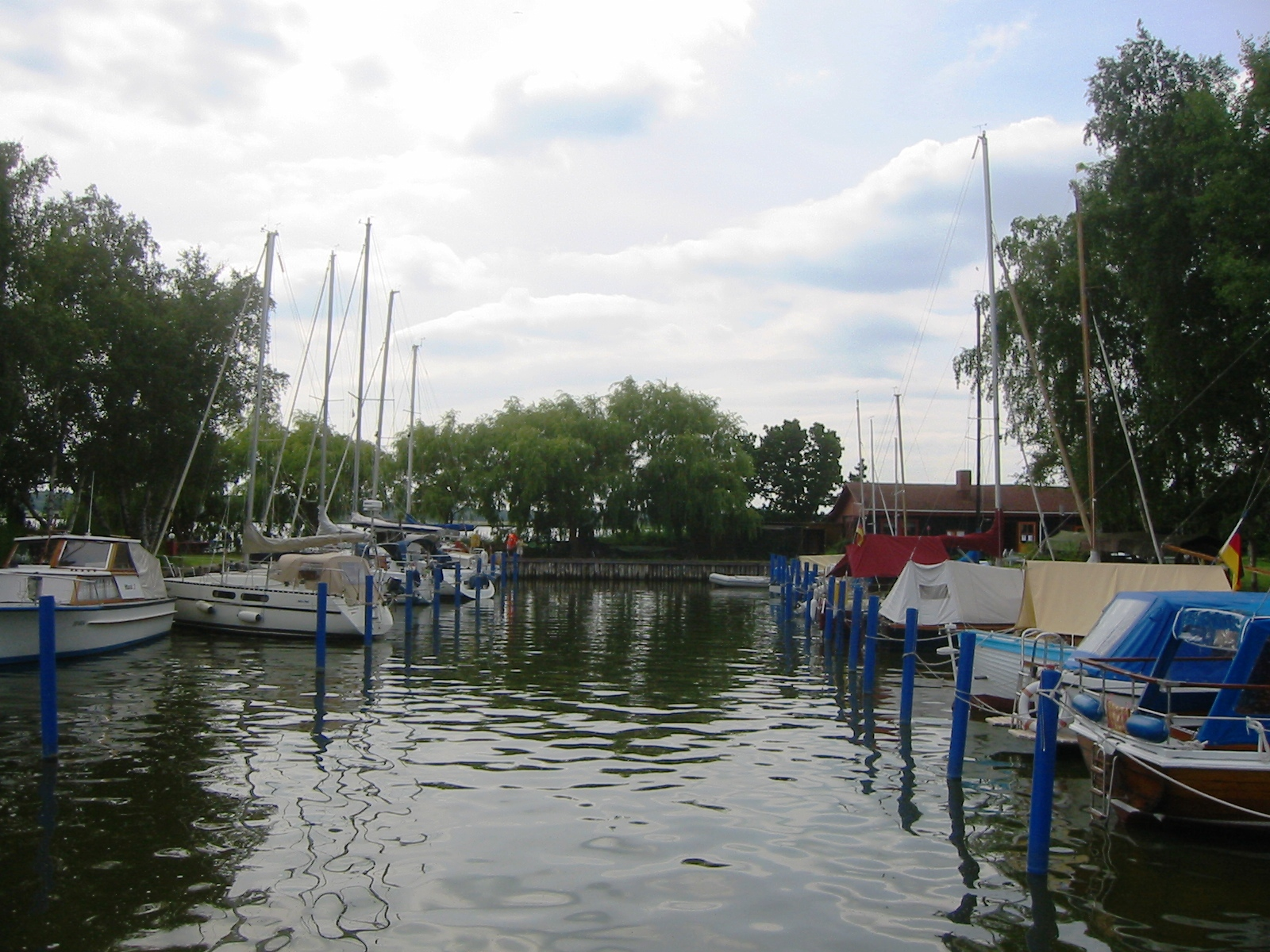
Harbour in Dändorf, 2012

Dändorf is a district of the Baltic seaside resort Dierhagen, a municipality northwest of Ribnitz-Damgarten in the Vorpommern-Rügen district.

== History ==
=== Middle Ages ===
The first recorded mention of Dändorf dates back to 1356. In older records, it is also referred to as Dänendorf, Dendorf, or Dendorff, suggesting that there was already a Danish settlement here in the 13th century. The suffix -dorf indicates a German-speaking settlement.

=== 18th century ===
In the 18th century, the Salt Road led from Bad Sülze through Dändorf to Wismar and Schwerin. Salt was transported on the Recknitz and the Saaler Bodden to Dändorf on flat, almost 20-meter long boats (the barges). From here, it continued with carts and later with wagons to the coast of Dierhagen. The further transport to Wismar was done using basket boats, which were later replaced by yachts. Dändorf benefited from this role as a transshipment point. The village street was paved so that the salt transports would not get stuck in bad weather. This street is still preserved today and is listed as a monument.

=== 19th century ===
In the 19th century, the rural character of the settlement changed due to increasing shipping. In the 1830s, 49 sailors lived in Dändorf. It experienced its heyday between 1860 and 1870. At that time, it was considered one of the richest Mecklenburg villages. In traditions, it is mentioned that Grand Duke Friedrich Franz II referred to Dändorf as "my gold village". In 1867, the first privately run navigation preparation school was established, where sailors learned their knowledge during the winter months to then earn their Officer's Patents. However, the advent of steam shipping ended the village's wealth. By 1892, only 17 ships were listed as being led by Dändorfer captains. The school had to close due to lack of demand, yet it still allowed socially disadvantaged people to participate in the comparatively inexpensive teaching. The building was demolished in 1970; the historic residential building was destroyed in a lightning strike and subsequent fire in 1985.

=== 20th century ===
In search of new sources of income, the locals looked to the emerging bathing culture in Dierhagen and Wustrow, and also offered accommodation. The first bathers are documented for 1902, and three years later, 267 summer guests were counted. In 1938, the districts Bollhagen and Neuhaus were incorporated. After the end of World War II, tourism flourished further. In 1960, around 15,000 vacationers were registered due to the establishment of a camping site in Bollhagen and a FDGB holiday home Lebensfreude in Neuhaus. In 1959, the village's only windmill burned down when the wings tore off in a storm, heated up and sparks ignited the building.

In 1965, Dändorf was incorporated into the municipality of Dierhagen.
