= Panic of 1873 =

Financial crisis leading to economic depression in Europe and North America

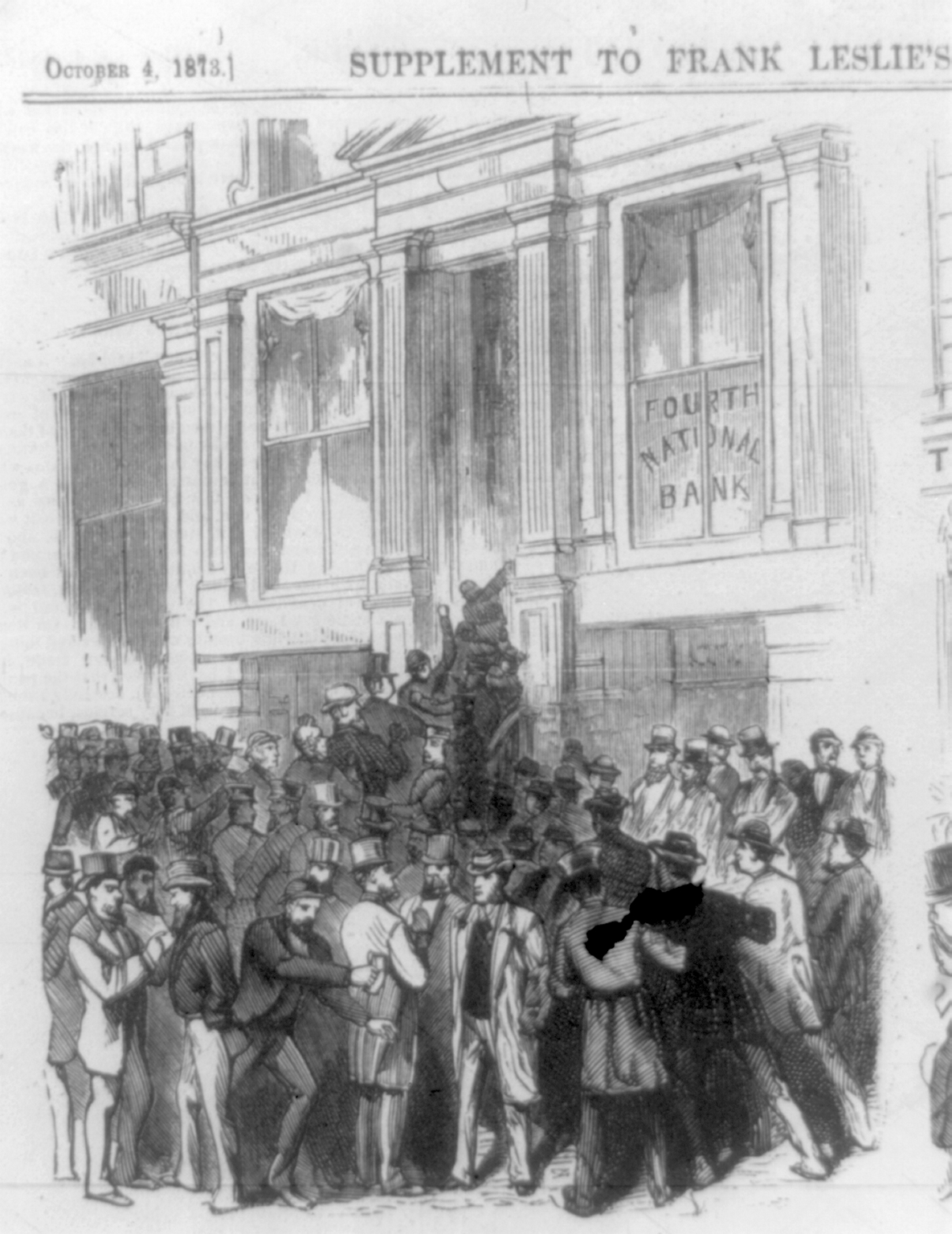
- Run on the Fourth National Bank, New York City, October 4, 1873
- Date: 1873 – 1877 (effects lasted until 1879)
- Location: Austria-Hungary, German Empire, United Kingdom, and the United States
- Participants: Jay Cooke & Company; New York Stock Exchange; Banking institutions and railroad corporations
- Outcome: Triggered the Long Depression; Widespread bank failures and railroad bankruptcies; Closure of the New York Stock Exchange for ten days; High unemployment and labor unrest

The Panic of 1873 was a financial crisis that triggered an economic depression in Europe and North America that lasted from 1873 to 1877, continuing until 1879 in France, Great Britain, and Ireland. In Britain, the panic started two decades of economic stagnation known as the "Long Depression" that weakened the country's economic leadership. In the United States, the period of economic stagnation was known as the "Great Depression" until the events of 1929 and the early 1930s set a new standard.

The Panic of 1873 and the subsequent depression had several underlying causes, of which economic historians debate the relative importance. American inflation, rampant speculative investments (overwhelmingly in railroads), the demonetization of silver in Germany and the United States, ripples from economic dislocation in Europe resulting from the Franco-Prussian War (1870–1871), and major property losses in the Great Chicago Fire (1871) and the Great Boston Fire (1872) all contributed to a massive strain on bank reserves, which in New York City plummeted from $50 million to $17 million between September and October 1873. The first symptoms of the crisis were financial failures in Vienna, the capital of Austria-Hungary, which spread to most of Europe and to North America by 1873.

== General background ==
Europe and North America experienced an economic boom built on bond investments, and world trade expanded. After 1850 two banking institutions issued 70% of global bonds, the Rothschild family and the Barings Bank.

== Europe ==
=== Germany and Austria-Hungary ===
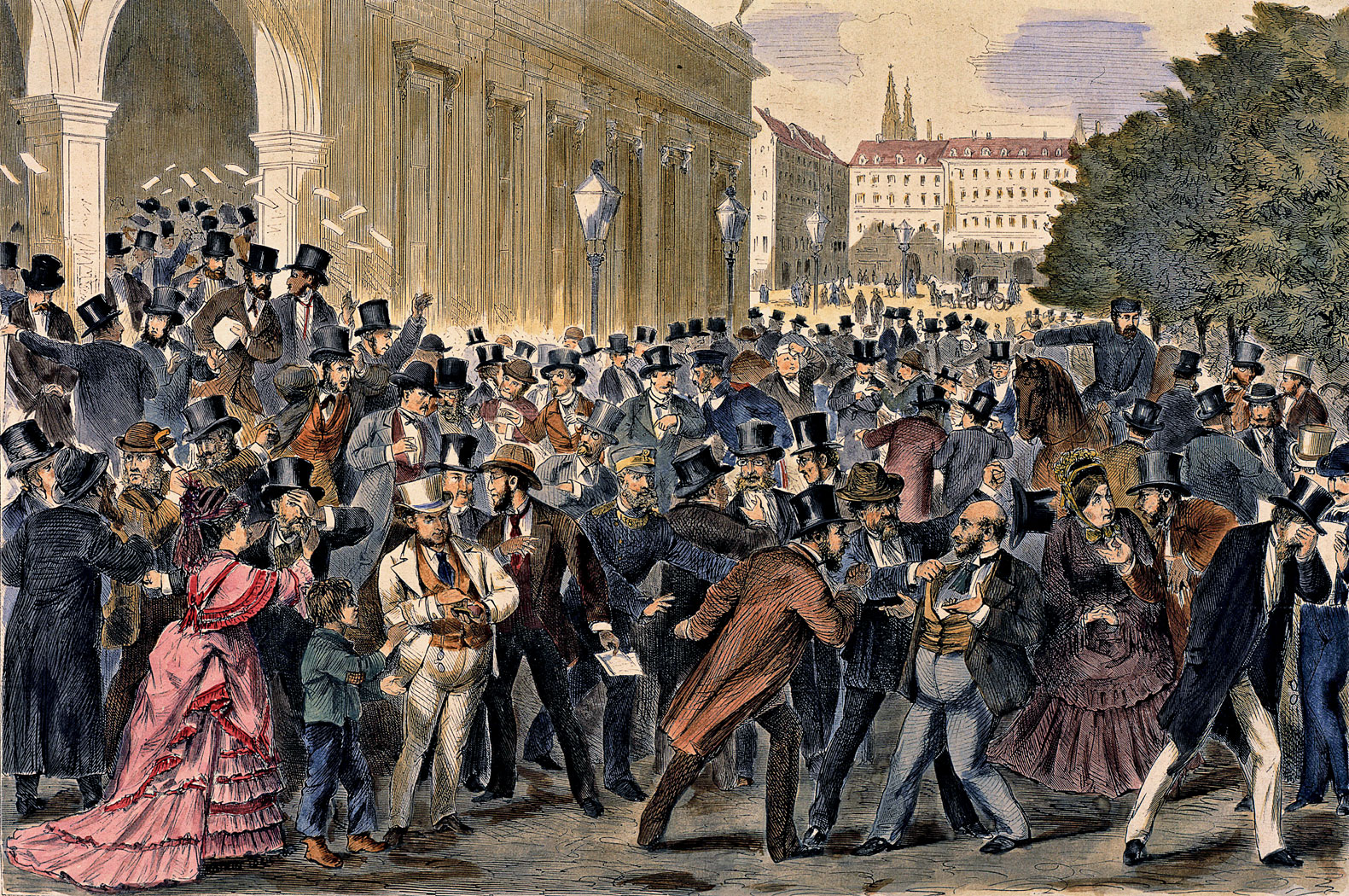
Black Friday, 9 May 1873, Vienna Stocks

Economic expansion took place in Germany and Austria-Hungary, where the period from German unification in 1870 and 1871 to the crash in 1873 came to be called the Gründerjahre ("Founders' Years"). A liberalized incorporation law in Germany gave impetus to a rise in IPOs the foundation of enterprises such as Deutsche Bank, and the incorporation of established ones. After the Franco-Prussian War in 1871 there was a massive influx of capital from the payment by France of war reparations. According to Liaquat Ahamed "German states paid off their debts. So they retired all their government bonds, and the savers who held German government bonds were left with cash. The question was what to do with this cash." It was invested in the stock market and fueled speculation in railways, factories, docks, and steamships, the same industrial branches that expanded unsustainably in the United States. In the immediate aftermath of his victory against France, Otto von Bismarck also began the process of silver demonetization and placed Germany on the gold standard. The process began on 23 November 1871 and culminated in the introduction of the gold mark on 9 July 1873 as the currency for the newly founded German Empire, replacing the silver coins of all constituent lands. Demonetization of silver was thus a common element in the crises on both sides of the Atlantic Ocean.

On 9 May 1873, the Vienna Stock Exchange crashed because it was unable to sustain the bubble of false expansion, insolvencies, and dishonest manipulations. A series of Viennese bank failures ensued, causing a contraction of the money available for business lending. One of the more famous people who went bankrupt in 1873 was Stephan Keglevich of Vienna, a relative of Gábor Keglevich who had been the master of the royal treasury (1842–1848) and in 1845 had co-founded a financial association to fund the expansion of Hungarian industry and to protect the loan repayments, similar to the 1870 Kreditschutzverband, an Austrian association for the protection of creditors and the interests of its members in cases of bankruptcy. That made it possible for several Austrian banks to be established in 1873 after the Vienna Stock Exchange crash.

In Berlin, the railway empire of Bethel Henry Strousberg crashed after a ruinous settlement with the government of Romania, bursting the speculation bubble in Germany. The contraction of the German economy was exacerbated by the conclusion of payments by France in September 1873. Two years after the foundation of the German Empire, the panic came and became known as the Gründerkrach or "Founders' Crash". In 1865, Keglevich and Strousberg had come into direct competition in a project in what is now Slovakia. In 1870 the Hungarian government, and in 1872 the Emperor-King Franz Joseph of Austria, resolved the question of the competing projects.

Although the collapse of the foreign loan financing had been predicted, the events of that year were in themselves comparatively unimportant. Buda, the old capital of Hungary, and Óbuda were officially united with Pest, thus creating Budapest in 1873. The difference in stability between Vienna and Berlin had the effect that the French indemnity to Germany flowed into Austria and Russia, but the indemnity payments aggravated the crisis in Austria, which had benefited by the accumulation of capital not only in Germany but also in England, the Netherlands, Belgium, France, and Russia.

Recovery from the crash occurred much more quickly in Europe than in the United States. Moreover, German businesses managed to avoid the sort of deep wage cuts that embittered American labor relations. There was an anti-Semitic component to the economic recovery in Germany and Austria, as small investors blamed Jews for their losses in the crash. The Neuer Sozial-Demokrat newspaper of the General German Workers' Association (ADAV) published several articles blaming Gerson von Bleichröder for the stock market crash. An October 29 article called Bleichröder "Bismarck's Jew".

Soon, more luxury hotels and villas were built in Opatija, and a railway line was extended in 1873 from the Vienna–Trieste line to Rijeka (Fiume), making it possible to go by tram from there to Opatija. The strong increase of port traffic generated a permanent demand for expansion. The Suez Canal was opened in 1869. 1875–1890 became "the golden years" of Giovanni de Ciotta in Rijeka.

The crash is central in the 1877 novel The Breaking of the Storm by the German writer Friedrich Spielhagen. A portrayal of German business life in the 1870s, the literary scholar Jeffrey L. Sammons has described it as "the major fictional treatment of the financial crash of the 1870s as a harbinger of the predatory but erratic capitalism that was to become characteristic of the Reich".

=== Britain ===
The opening of the Suez Canal was one of the causes of the Panic of 1873 because goods from the Far East had previously been carried in sailing vessels around the Cape of Good Hope and had been stored in British warehouses. As sailing vessels were not adaptable for use through the Suez Canal (because the prevailing winds of the Mediterranean Sea blow from west to east), the British entrepôt trade suffered.

When the crisis came, the Bank of England raised interest rates to 9 percent. Despite this, Britain did not experience the scale of financial mayhem seen in America and Central Europe, perhaps forestalled by an expectation that the liquidity-constraining provisions of the Bank Charter Act 1844 would be suspended as they had been in the crises of 1847, 1857, and 1866. The ensuing economic downturn in Britain seems to have been muted – "stagnant" but without a "decline in aggregate output". However, there was heavy unemployment in the basic industries of coal, iron and steel, engineering, and shipbuilding, especially in 1873, 1886, and 1893.

==== Comparison with Germany ====
From 1873 to 1896, a period sometimes referred to as the Long Depression, most European countries experienced a drastic fall in prices. Still, many corporations were able to reduce production costs and achieve better productivity rates with industrial production increasing by 40% in Britain and by over 100% in Germany. A comparison of capital formation rates in both countries helps to account for the different industrial growth rates. During the depression, the British ratio of net national capital formation to net national product fell from 11.5% to 6.0%, but the German ratio rose from 10.6% to 15.9%. Britain took the course of static supply adjustment, but Germany stimulated effective demand and expanded industrial supply capacity by increasing and adjusting capital formation. For example, Germany dramatically increased investment of social overhead capital, such as in the management of electric power transmission lines, roads, and railroads, thereby stimulating industrial demand in that country, but similar investment stagnated or decreased in Britain. The resulting difference in capital formation accounts for the divergent levels of industrial production in the two countries and the different growth rates during and after the depression.

=== India ===
The discovery of large quantities of silver in the United States and several European colonies caused the panic of 1873 and thus a decline in the value of silver relative to gold, devaluing India's standard currency.

=== South Africa ===
In the Cape Colony, the panic caused bankruptcies, rising unemployment, a pause in public works, and a major trade slump that lasted until the discovery of gold in 1886.

=== Ottoman Empire ===
In the Ottoman Empire rates of growth of foreign trade dropped, external terms of trade deteriorated, declining wheat prices affected peasant producers, and the establishment of European control over Ottoman finances led to large debt payments abroad. The growth rates of agricultural and aggregate production were also lower during the Long Depression than the later period.

=== Latin Monetary Union ===
The general demonetization and cheapening of silver caused the Latin Monetary Union in 1873 to suspend the conversion of silver to coins.

== United States ==
=== Factors ===
The American Civil War (1861–1865) was followed by a boom in railroad construction. 33,000 miles (53,000 km) of track were laid across the country between 1868 and 1873, with much of the craze in railroad investment being driven by government land grants and subsidies to the railroads. The railroad industry was the largest employer outside of agriculture and involved large amounts of money and risk. A large infusion of cash from speculators caused spectacular growth in the industry and in the construction of docks, factories, and ancillary facilities. Most capital was involved in projects offering no immediate or early returns.

=== Coinage Act of 1873 ===
A period of economic overexpansion arose from the northern railroad boom before a series of economic setbacks: the Black Friday panic of 1869, the Chicago fire of 1871, an outbreak of equine influenza and the Boston fire of 1872.

The decision of the German Empire to cease minting silver thaler coins in 1871 caused a drop in demand and downward pressure on the value of silver, which in turn affected the U.S. since much of the supply of silver was mined there. As a result, the U.S. Congress passed the Coinage Act of 1873, which changed the national silver policy. Before the act, the U.S. had backed its currency with both gold and silver and minted both types of coins. The act moved the U.S. to a de facto gold standard, which meant it would no longer buy silver at a statutory price or convert silver from the public into silver coins, but it would still mint silver dollars for export in the form of trade dollars.

The act had the immediate effect of depressing silver prices, hurting Western mining interests who labeled the act "The Crime of '73", but its effect was offset somewhat by the introduction of a silver trade dollar for use in Asia and the discovery of silver deposits at Virginia City, Nevada, that resulted in new investment in mining activity. The act also reduced the domestic money supply, raising interest rates and hurting farmers and others who normally carried heavy debt loads. The resulting outcry raised serious questions about how long the new policy would last. The perception of U.S. instability in its monetary policy caused investors to shy away from long-term obligations, particularly long-term bonds. The problem was compounded by the railroad boom, which was then in its later stages.

==== Jay Cooke & Company fails ====
In September 1873, Jay Cooke & Company, a major component of the country's banking establishment, found itself unable to market several million dollars in Northern Pacific Railway bonds. Jay Cooke's firm, like many others, had invested heavily in the railroads. Some investment banks were then anxious for more capital for their enterprises. U.S. President Ulysses S. Grant's monetary policy of contracting the money supply and thus raising interest rates made matters worse for those in debt. Businesses were expanding, but the money they needed to finance that growth was becoming scarcer.

Cooke and other entrepreneurs had planned to build the second transcontinental railroad, the Northern Pacific Railway. Cooke's firm provided the financing, and ground for the line was broken near Duluth, Minnesota, on 15 February 1870. The railroad had borrowed more than $1.5 million from Jay Cooke & Company but was incapable of paying it back. An expanding funding gap became harder to resolve due to the Credit Mobilier scandal. Due to the financial crises in Europe, Cooke could not sell the securities abroad. Just as Cooke was about to access a $300 million government loan in September 1873, reports circulated that his firm's credit had become nearly worthless. On 18 September, the firm declared bankruptcy.

==== Insurance industry ====
Many U.S. insurance companies went out of business, as the deteriorating financial conditions created solvency problems for life insurers. The common factor of the surviving companies was that all marketed tontines.

=== Effects ===
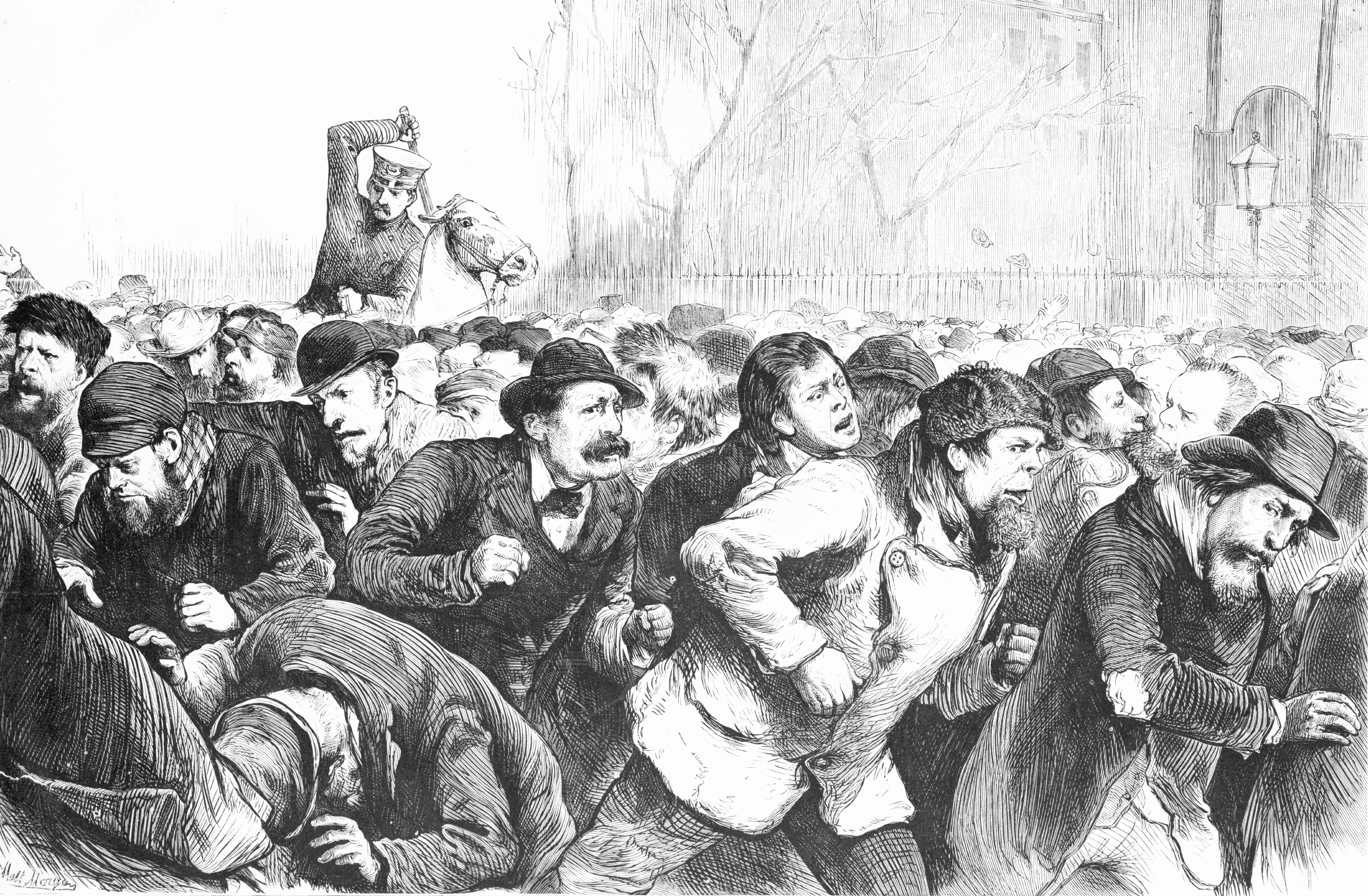
New York police violently attacking unemployed workers in Tompkins Square Park, 1874

The failure of Cooke's bank and soon afterward of Henry Clews' set off a chain reaction of bank failures and temporarily closed the New York Stock Exchange. Factories began to lay off workers as the country slipped into depression. The effects of the panic were quickly felt in New York (where 25% of workers became unemployed) and more slowly in Chicago, Virginia City, Nevada (where silver mining was active), and San Francisco.

The New York Stock Exchange closed for ten days starting on 20 September. By November, 55 of the nation's railroads had failed, and another 60 had gone bankrupt by the first anniversary of the crisis. Construction of rail lines, formerly one of the backbones of the economy, plummeted from 7,500 miles (12,100 km) of track in 1872 to just 1,600 miles (2,600 km) in 1875, and 18,000 businesses failed between 1873 and 1875. Unemployment peaked in 1878 at 8.25%. Building construction was halted, wages were cut, real estate values fell, and corporate profits vanished.

In 1874, Congress passed "the Ferry Bill" to allow for the printing of currency, increasing inflation and reducing the value of debts. The bill was vetoed by President Grant. The following year, Congress passed the Specie Resumption Act of 1875, which would back United States currency with gold. Backing American currency with gold helped curb inflation and stabilize the dollar.

=== Railroad strike ===
The railroad industry had seen major growth in the decades before 1873, driven in part by strong European interest in bonds issued by railroad companies. The failure of Jay Cooke & Co., heavily invested in railroad bonds, triggered a crisis in the railroad industry.

In 1877, steep wage cuts led railroad workers to launch the series of protests and riots later dubbed the Great Railroad Strike. Initial protests broke out in Martinsburg, West Virginia, after the Baltimore and Ohio Railroad (B&O) cut workers' pay for the third time in a year. West Virginia Governor Henry M. Mathews sent the militia, under Colonel Charles J. Faulkner, to restore order but was unsuccessful, largely because the militia sympathized with the workers. Mathews called on President Rutherford B. Hayes for federal assistance, and Hayes dispatched federal troops. That restored peace to Martinsburg but proved controversial, with many newspapers critical of Mathews' characterization of the strikes as an "insurrection", rather than an act of desperation and frustration. The Martinsburg Statesman recorded a striking worker's perspective that he "might as well die by the bullet as to starve to death by inches".

Within a week, similar protests had erupted in other cities. In Baltimore, strikers set fire to buildings owned by B&O and an outnumbered militia guard division opened fire when they were surrounded by rioters, killing 10 and injuring 25 more, leading to a days-long standoff at Camden Yards. In New York, striking workers began throwing objects at arriving trains, prompting a response from local police. Pennsylvania saw perhaps the worst violence of the railroad strikes; notably in the Pittsburgh railroad strike of 1877, the Reading Railroad massacre and the Scranton general strike. In Chicago, striking workers brought freight and passenger trains to a standstill, leading to an order from Judge Thomas Drummond that such actions were illegal. The United States Marshals Service responded by arresting dozens of strikers. In Missouri, strikers also brought rail traffic to a halt, and at least 18 people died in conflicts.

In July 1877, the market for lumber crashed, leading several Michigan lumber companies to go bankrupt. Within a year, the effects of this second business slump reached all the way to California.

=== Aftermath ===
The depression ended in the spring of 1879, but tension between workers and the leaders of banking and manufacturing interests lingered on. Poor economic conditions caused voters to turn against the Republican Party. In the 1874 congressional elections, the Democratic Party assumed control of the House for the first time since the Civil War.

Public opinion made it difficult for the Grant administration to develop a coherent policy on the Southern states, and the North began to steer away from Reconstruction. Ambitious railroad building programs crashed across the South, leaving most states deep in debt and burdened with heavy taxes. Retrenchment was a common response of the South to state debts during the depression. One by one, each state fell to the Democrats in the South, and the Republicans lost power.

The end of the crisis coincided with the beginning of the great wave of immigration to the United States, which lasted until the early 1920s.

== Global protectionism ==
After the 1873 depression, agricultural and industrial groups lobbied for protective tariffs. Conservative politicians such as Bismarck shifted from classical liberal economic policies in the 1870s, embracing many economic interventionist policies, including high tariffs, nationalization of railroads, and compulsory social insurance. The political and economic nationalism also reduced the fortunes of the German and Canadian classical liberal parties. France, like Britain, entered into a prolonged stagnation that extended to 1897. The French attempted to deal with their economic problems by the implementation of tariffs. French laws implemented in 1880 and 1892 imposed stiff tariffs on many agricultural and industrial imports. The U.S. continued to be protectionist.

== See also ==
- Panic of 1857 – American economic crisis
- Panic of 1893 – 1893–97 financial crisis in the United States
- Second-term curse – Purported curse regarding the second term of U.S. presidents
- Workingmen's Party of Illinois

== Popular Culture ==
- "The Working-Man's Soliloquy" Words by Louis P. Marto, 1875, music by Alfred J. Cobbin.

== Cited sources ==
- Loomis, Noel M. (1968). Wells Fargo.
- Marek, George R. (1974). The Eagles Die: Franz Joseph, Elisabeth, and Their Austria. Harper & Row. ISBN 978-0-246-10880-7.
- Masur, Gerhard (1970). Imperial Berlin. New York: Basic Books. ISBN 0465032095.
