= Darß =

Peninsula in Mecklenburg-Western Pomerania, Germany

Coordinates: 54°25′N 12°32′E

The Darß or Darss (German pronunciation: [daʁs]) is the middle part of the peninsula of Fischland-Darß-Zingst on the southern shore of the Baltic Sea in the German state of Mecklenburg-Western Pomerania. The peninsula's name is of Slavic origin. There is a large forest in the Darß. In recent times, the name "Darß" has also been used to refer to the entire peninsula.

The Darß is famous for being a resting place for tens of thousands of migrating cranes and geese. Tourism has long been a source of income and has increased since German reunification, but the Darß is still far from being a crowded tourist place.

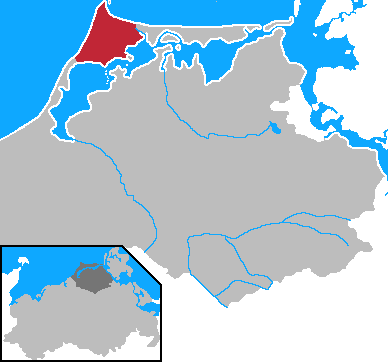
Location of the Darß in Mecklenburg-Western Pomerania.

== Location and character ==
The Darß lies northeast of Fischland and west of the peninsula of Zingst, its boundary with the latter being formed by the inlet of the Prerower Strom. To the north lies the Baltic Sea; to the south the lagoons of Saaler Bodden and Bodstedter Bodden, which belong to the Darss-Zingst Bodden Chain. The Darß measures between 10 and 12 kilometres (6.2 and 7.5 mi) from north to south and from east to west and is home to the villages of Born a. Darß, Prerow and Wieck. The village of Ahrenshoop in the municipality of Ahrenshoop belongs to Vordarß, whilst the southern villages in Ahrenshoop, Althagen and Niehagen, are part of Fischland.

Most of the Darß is covered by the woodland of the Darß Forest, 5,800 hectares (14,000 acres) in area. On the northern tip of the Darß, at Darßer Ort, is a lighthouse of the same name. The National Park exhibition in Wieck a. Darß provides information about the geological development as well as the flora and fauna of the Western Pomerania Lagoon Area National Park, as does the Natureum in Wieck a. Darß attached to the Darßer Ort Lighthouse, as outstations of the German Oceanographic Museum in Stralsund. Darßer Ort is an extended chain of sandbanks running in a northeasterly direction. The entire area around Darßer Ort as well as the northwestern part of the Darß Forest is part of Protection Zone I of the National Park and may only be visited on marked paths. The rest of the forested region is also part of the National Park.
