= Born auf dem Darß =

Born
- Municipality
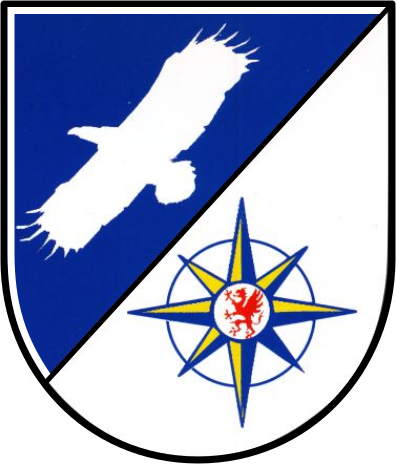
- Coat of arms

- Location of Born within Vorpommern-Rügen district
- Interactive map of Born
- Location within Germany Location within Mecklenburg-Vorpommern
- Coordinates: 54°23′09″N 12°31′36″E
- Country: Germany
- State: Mecklenburg-Vorpommern
- District: Vorpommern-Rügen
- Municipal assoc.: Darß/Fischland

Government
  - Mayor: Gerd Scharmberg

Area
  - Total: 63.56 km^{2} (24.54 sq mi)
- Elevation: 3 m (9.8 ft)

Population (2025-12-31)
  - Total: 1,037
  - Density: 16.32/km^{2} (42.26/sq mi)
- Time zone: UTC+01:00 (CET)
  - Summer (DST): UTC+02:00 (CEST)
- Postal codes: 18375
- Dialling codes: 038234
- Vehicle registration: VR, NVP
- Website: http://www.darss-fischland.de/

Born auf dem Darß (German pronunciation: [ˈbɔʁn ʔaʊf deːm ˈdaʁs], lit. 'Born on the Darß'; officially Born a. Darß) is a municipality in the Vorpommern-Rügen district, in Mecklenburg-Western Pomerania, Germany. It is part of the peninsula Darß, to which also belong the villages of Prerow and Wieck. Born is situated at the southern shore of the peninsula Darß at the coastal lagoon (Low German: Bodden), between Wieck and the Baltic seaside resort Ahrenshoop.

== Landscape ==
The Darß is part of the former islands Fischland, Darß and Zingst. The peninsula is part of the Western Pomerania Lagoon Area National Park.

== History ==
For centuries Born belonged to the Duchy of Pomerania and became Swedish after the Thirty Years War. After the Treaty of Westphalia in 1648 Born became part of Swedish Pomerania until 1815, when Sweden ceded Pomerania to Prussia.

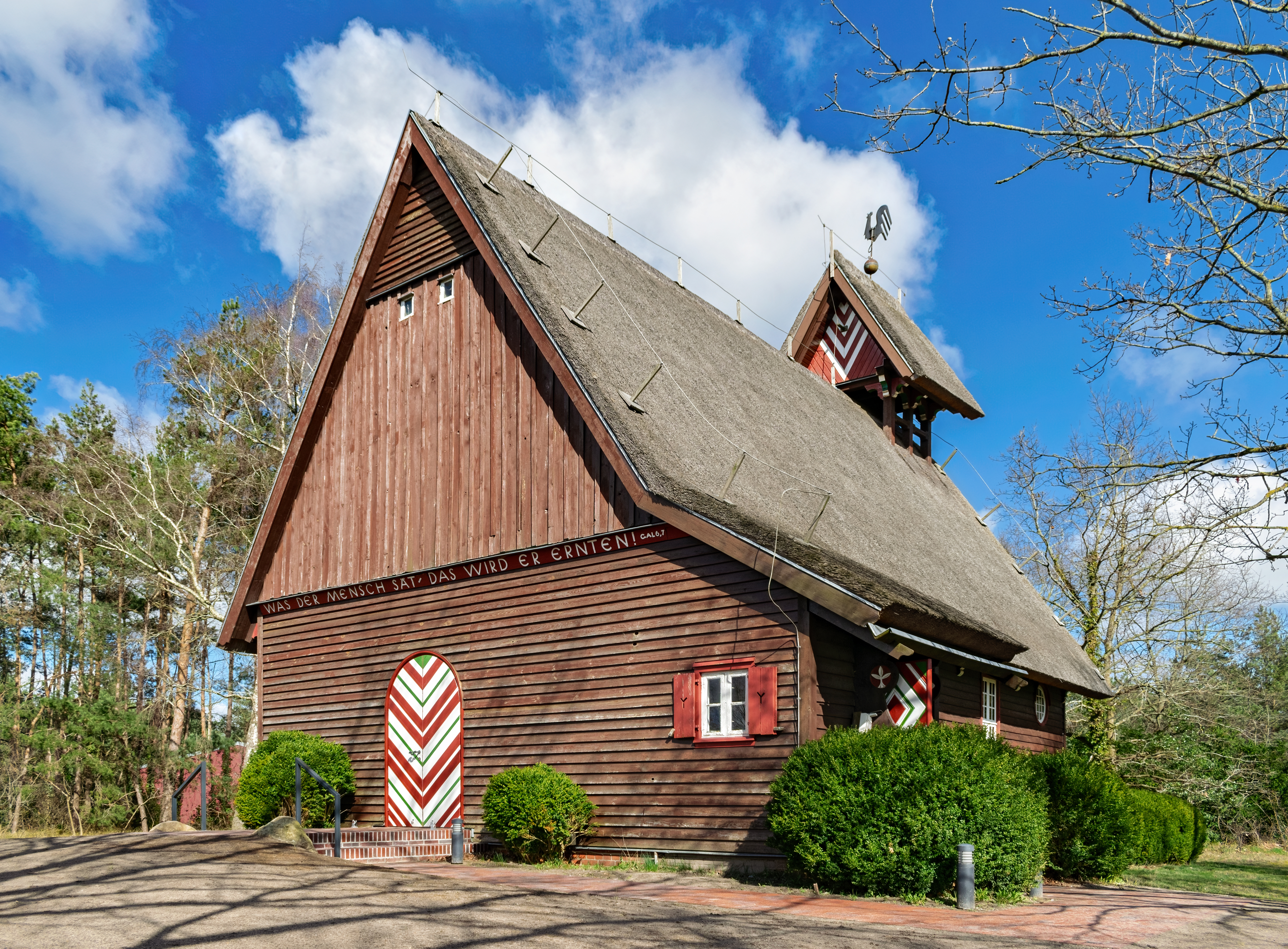
Fishermen's Church

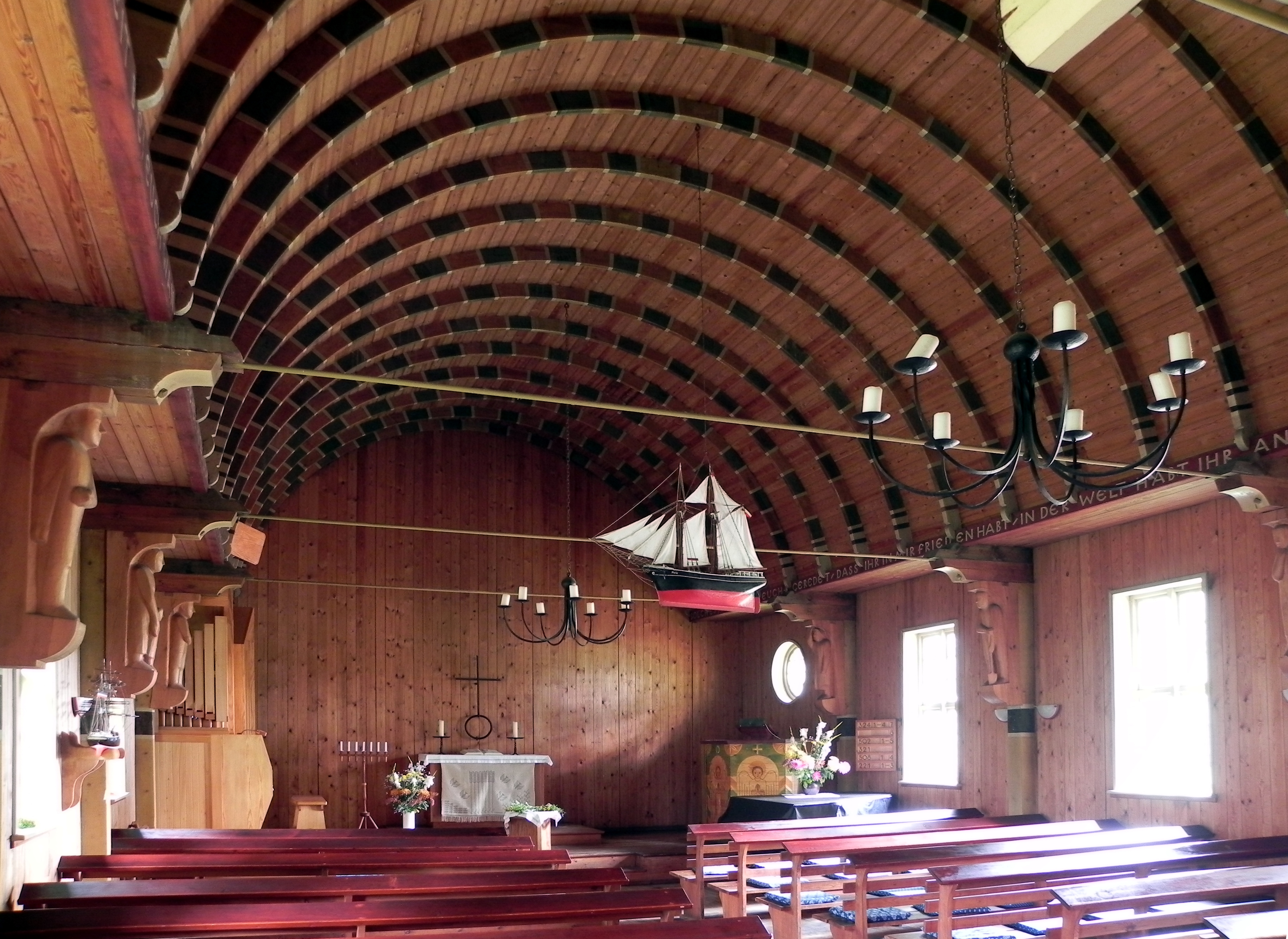
Interior of the Fishermen's Church

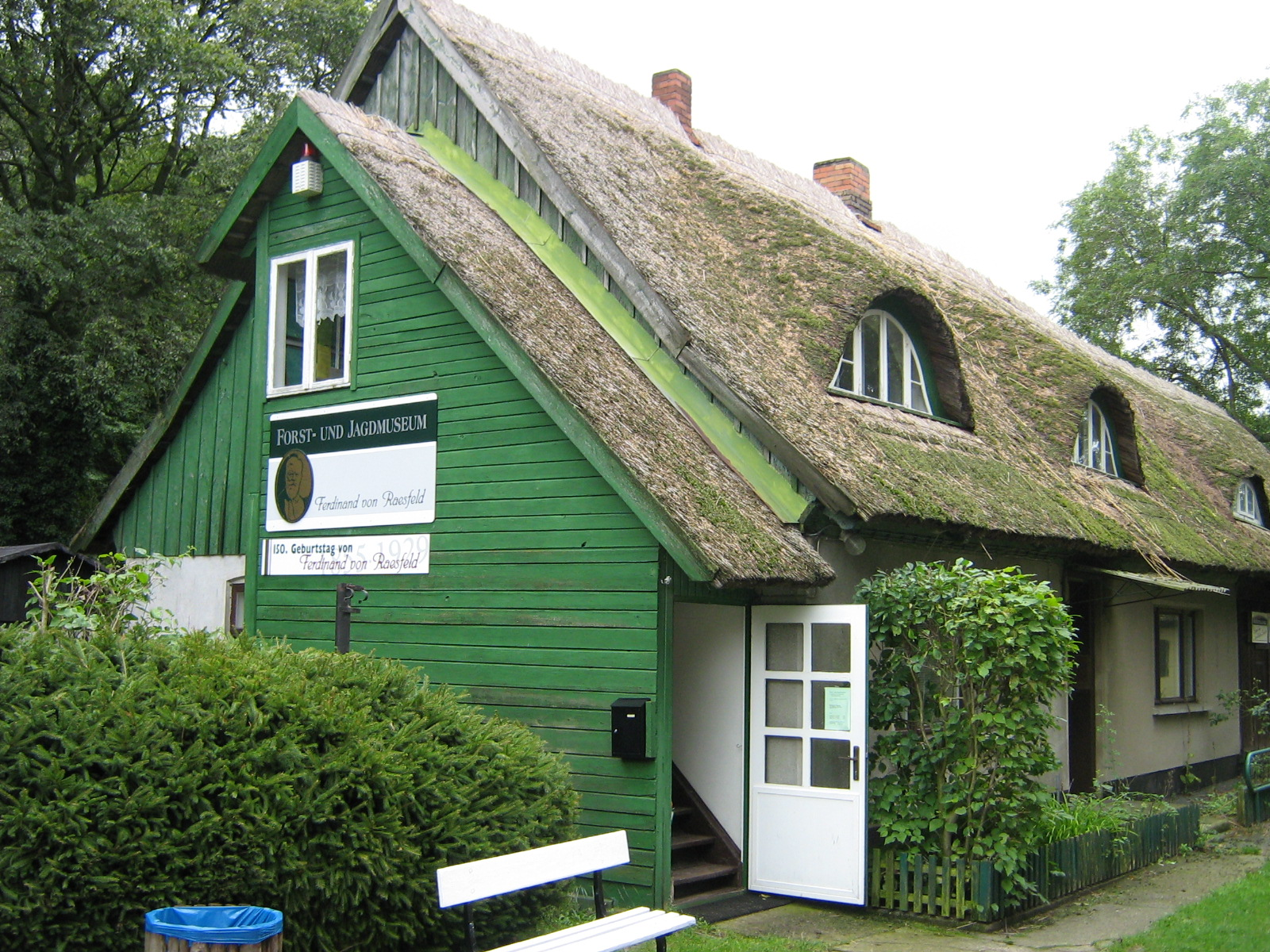
"Forst- und Jagdmuseum Ferdinand von Raesfeld" in the former Forstamt
