= Charles Kreeft =

New Zealand cricketer (1859–1924)

Personal information
- Full name: Charles Vaughan Kreeft
- Born: 1859; Williamstown, Victoria, Australia
- Died: 1 August 1928 (aged 68–69); Wellington, New Zealand
- Batting: Right-handed
- Bowling: Right-arm fast

Domestic team information
- Years: Team
- 1882/83: Wellington
- Source: Cricinfo, 24 October 2020

Charles Vaughan Kreeft (1859 – 1 August 1924) was a New Zealand cricketer. He played in one first-class match for Wellington in 1882–83 and played representatively for the Wellington Rugby Union.

Kreeft was born in Williamstown, Victoria in 1859. His family was considered one of the oldest living in Wellington and he was educated at Wellington College. Described as "a prominent all-round athlete" who was "well-known" in Wellington sporting circles, he played rugby for Wellington FC and played in the 1877 provincial representative match against West Coast. As a cricketer he was considered a "great bowler" and an "aggressive batsman". He was part of Wellington Cricket Club's side that won the senior championship during the 1880s and later captained the club's sides at times.

Kreeft's only first-class match for Wellington was a December 1882 fixture against Auckland at the Basin Reserve. He took one wicket and scored 12 runs in a heavy defeat.

Professionally Kreeft worked as a civil servant for more than 40 years. He worked in the Treasury Department of the New Zealand government, initially in the property tax office before transferring to the land and income tax branch. A life member of Wellington FC, Kreeft was considered a "highly respected" resident of the city. He died after a long illness in 1924. His wife, who he had married in 1890, had died earlier in the year.
