= Wieck auf dem Darß =

- Municipality
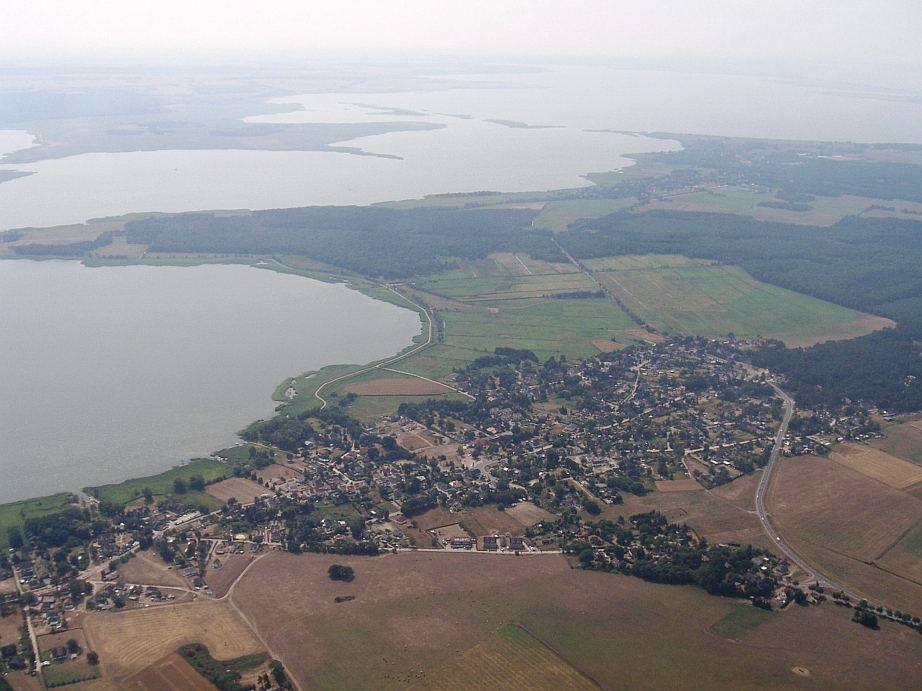
- Wieck af dem Darß and Born auf dem Darß

- Location of Wieck auf dem Darß within Vorpommern-Rügen district
- Interactive map of Wieck auf dem Darß
- Location within Germany Location within Mecklenburg-Vorpommern
- Coordinates: 54°24′35″N 12°34′55″E
- Country: Germany
- State: Mecklenburg-Vorpommern
- District: Vorpommern-Rügen
- Municipal assoc.: Darß/Fischland

Government
  - Mayor: Bernd Evers

Area
  - Total: 9.02 km^{2} (3.48 sq mi)
- Elevation: 3 m (9.8 ft)

Population (2025-12-31)
  - Total: 701
  - Density: 77.7/km^{2} (201/sq mi)
- Time zone: UTC+01:00 (CET)
  - Summer (DST): UTC+02:00 (CEST)
- Postal codes: 18375
- Dialling codes: 038233
- Vehicle registration: NVP
- Website: http://www.darss-fischland.de/

Wieck auf dem Darß (German pronunciation: [ˈviːk ʔaʊf deːm ˈdaʁs], lit. 'Wieck on the Darß'; officially Wieck a. Darß) is a municipality in the Vorpommern-Rügen district, in Mecklenburg-Vorpommern, Germany.

== Geography ==
Wieck is situated at the southern shore of the peninsula Darß at the coastal lagoon (Low German: Bodden), between Born and the Baltic seaside resort Prerow.

== History ==
For centuries, Wieck belonged to the Duchy of Pomerania and became Swedish after the Thirty Years' War. After Napoleon, Wieck became in 1815 Pomeranian again. After World War II, it was part of the district of Ribnitz-Damgarten. Wieck now belongs to the federal state of Mecklenburg-Vorpommern.

== Places of interest ==
- Wieck Harbour
- Typical small thatched cottages
- Information centre of the national park with a huge exhibition
- Galleries with works of local artists

== Landscape ==
The Darß is part of the former islands Fischland, Darß and Zingst. The peninsula is part of the Western Pomerania Lagoon Area National Park. The surrounding of Wieck is famous for being a resting place for tens of thousands of migrating cranes and geese. Tourism has long been a source of income and been increased after the German reunification, but the Darß is still far from becoming a crowded tourist place.
