= Friedrich Spielhagen =

German novelist, literary theorist and translator

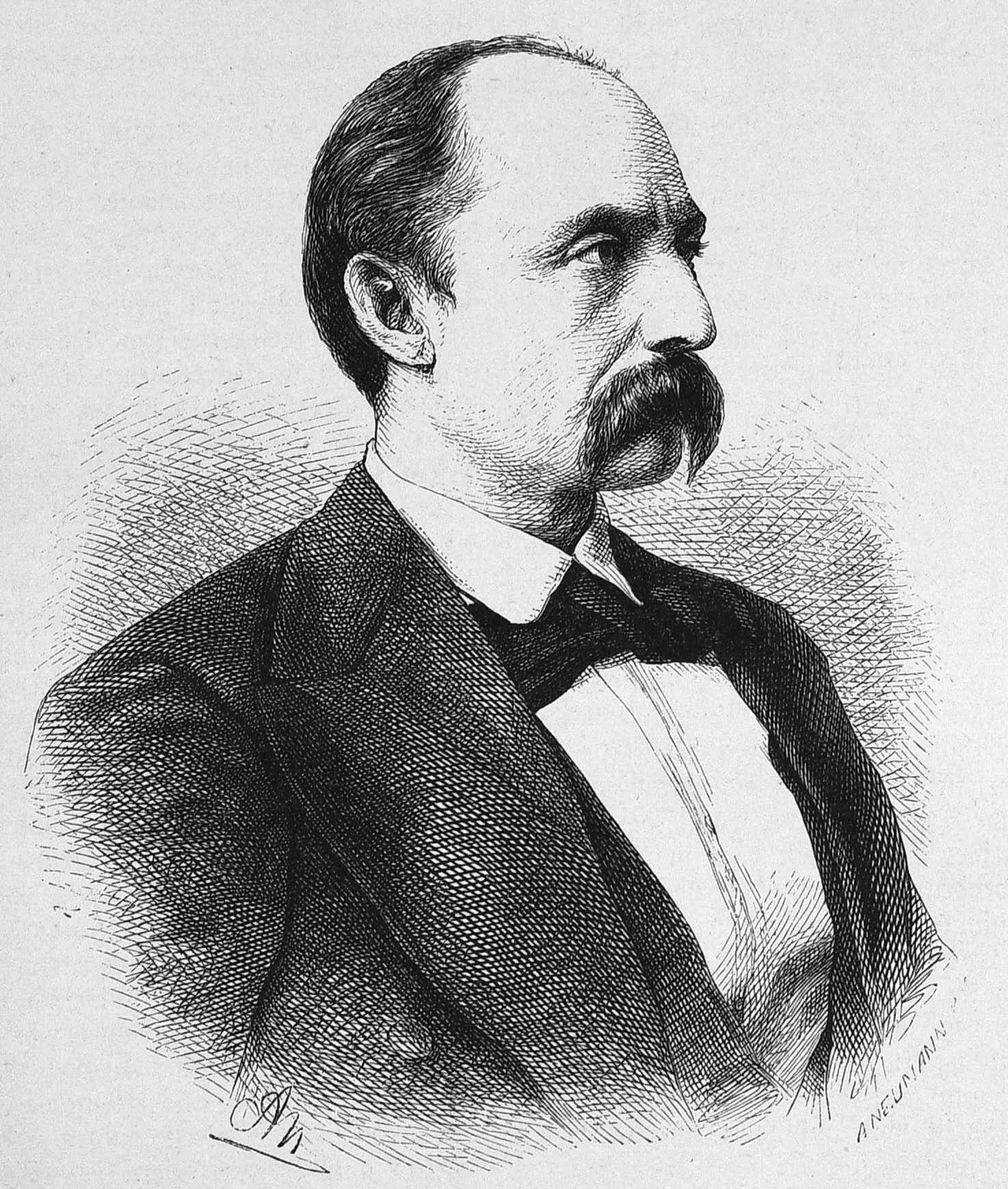
- Born: 24 February 1829; Magdeburg
- Died: 25 February 1911 (aged 82); Berlin

Friedrich Spielhagen (24 February 1829 – 25 February 1911) was a German novelist, literary theorist and translator. He tried a number of careers in his early 20s, but at 25 began writing and translating. His best known novel is Sturmflut and his novel In Reih' und Glied was quite successful in Russia.

== Life ==
Spielhagen was born in Magdeburg and brought up in Stralsund, where his father was appointed a government architect in 1835. He attended the gymnasium (roughly equivalent to an American high school) in Stralsund, studied law, and subsequently literature and philosophy at the universities of Berlin, Bonn and Greifswald.

At Bonn, he was a member of the Burschenschaft Franconia, which at that time also included Carl Schurz, Johannes Overbeck, Julius Schmidt, Carl Otto Weber, Ludwig Meyer and Adolf Strodtmann. In his Reminiscences, Schurz recalls Spielhagen as a person "in whom, in spite of his somewhat distant and reserved character, we all recognized a man of rare intellectuality and moral elevation, and who later became a star of the first magnitude among the novelists of the century."

After leaving university, he tried his hand at being a private tutor, an actor, a soldier and a teacher in a school in Leipzig, but upon his father's death in 1854 he devoted himself entirely to writing. In 1859, he became editor of the Zeitung für Norddeutschland (Newspaper for Northern Germany) in Hannover, and then, in 1862, moved to Berlin where he later edited Westermanns illustrirte deutsche Monatshefte (Westermann's Illustrated German Monthly) 1878–84.

As a translator, Spielhagen rendered into German George William Curtis's Howadji, Ralph Waldo Emerson's English Traits, a selection of American poems (1859; 2d ed. 1865), and William Roscoe's Lorenzo de' Medici. He also translated from the French minor works of Jules Michelet: L'amour, La femme, La mer.

He married Therese Boutin (1835–1900) with whom he had a daughter, Elsa Spielhagen (1866–1942). He died on 25 February 1911. Streets are named after him in his hometown of Magdeburg, as well as the three cities in which he lived: Stralsund, Hannover, and Berlin.

== Novels and a play ==
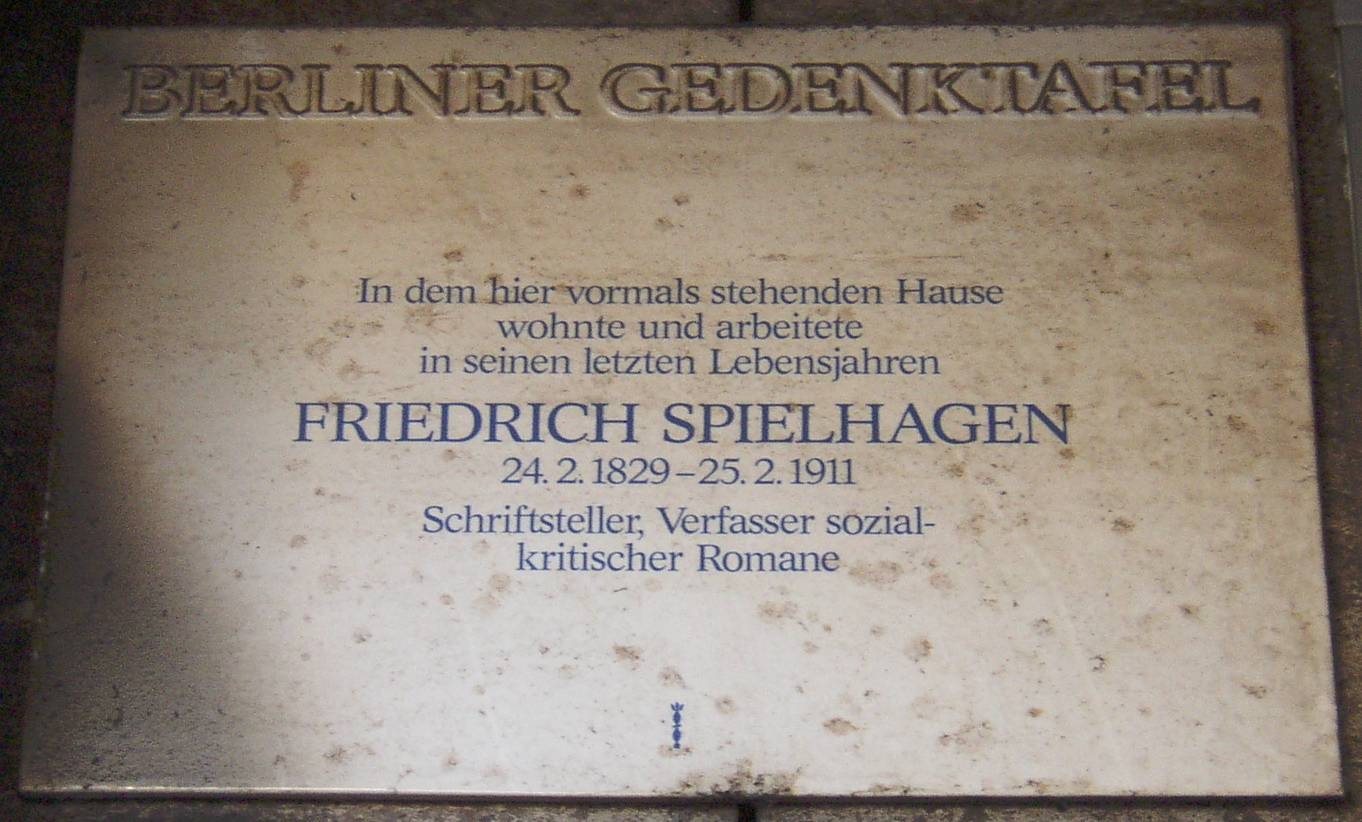
Berlin memorial tablet

After publishing Clara Vere (1857) and Auf der Düne (1858), neither of which was widely read, he began to write for newspapers and journals. In 1861, he struck gold with Problematische Naturen (1860–1861; English translation "Problematic Characters," by Prof. Schele de Vere, New York, 1869); it was followed a year later by a sequel, Durch Nacht zum Licht (English translation, "Through Night to Light," by Prof. Schele de Vere, New York, 1869), then by Die von Hohenstein (1863; English translation, "The Hohensteins," by Prof. Schele de Vere, 1870), In Reih' und Glied (1866), Hammer und Amboß (1869; English translation, "Hammer and Anvil," by William Hand Browne, 1873), Deutsche Pioniere (1870), Allzeit voran (1872), Was die Schwalbe sang (1873; English translation, "What the Swallow Sang," 1873), Ultimo (1874), Liebe für Liebe (a drama, which was produced in Leipzig; 1875), Sturmflut (based on the financial crises in Berlin following the Franco-Prussian War; 1876), Plattland (1878), Quisisana (1880), Angela (1881), Uhlenhans (1884), Ein neuer Pharao (1889), Faustulus (1897) and Freigeboren (1900) among many others. These days, Sturmflut is his best known work though it is currently only available in an abridged form. Spielhagen's later works were almost entirely on literary theory.

Spielhagen's Sämtliche Werke (Complete Works) were published in 1871 in sixteen volumes, in 1878 in fourteen volumes. His Sämtliche Romane (Complete Novels) followed in 1898 (22 vols), and these were followed by a new series in 1902. In 1890, he published his autobiography, Finder und Erfinder (2 vols, 1890).

His novel In Reih' und Glied, translated into Russian as Один в поле не воин [literally Odin v pole ne voin, a proverb meaning "One man in the field is not a warrior" or "One man alone can't win a war"] (1867–1868), with its revolutionary protagonist Leo (based on Ferdinand Lassalle), was extraordinarily popular in Russia, and virtually all his novels were subsequently translated there at least once, collected editions being brought out in 1895 (8 vols.) and 1898 (30 vols.).

== List of works ==
- Clara Vere, Novelle, 1857
- Auf der Düne, Novelle, 1858
- Problematische Naturen, Roman, 4 Bde., Berlin: Janke, 1861
- Durch Nacht zum Licht, Roman (Fortsetzung von Problematische Naturen), 1862
- In der zwölften Stunde, Novelle, 1862
- Vermischte Schriften, Bd. I, 1864
- Röschen vom Hofe, Novelle, 1864
- Die von Hohenstein, Roman, 1864
- In Reih’ und Glied, Roman, 1866
- Goethe-Galerie. Nach Original-Kartons von Wilhelm von Kaulbach. Mit erläuterndem Text von Friedrich Spielhagen. Verl.-Anst. für Kunst u. Wissenschaft, München 1867. Digitalisierte Ausgabe
- Vermischte Schriften, Bd. II, 1868
- Die Dorfcoquette, humoristischer Roman, 1868
- "Hammer und Amboß". Projekt Gutenberg-DE. 1869. Archived from the original on September 25, 2015., Roman
- Allzeit voran, Roman, 1871
- Was die Schwalbe sang, Roman, 1873 (1872 in: Die Gartenlaube erschienen)
- Ultimo, Novelle, 1874
- Liebe für Liebe, Schauspiel in vier Acten, 1875
- Sturmflut, Roman, 1877
- Platt Land, Roman, 1879
- Quisisana, Novelle, 1880
- Beiträge zur Theorie und Technik des Romans, 1883
- Was will das werden?, Roman, 1885
- Ein neuer Pharao, Roman, 1889
- Finder und Erfinder. Erinnerungen aus meinem Leben, 2 Bde., 1890
- Sonntagskind, Roman, 1893
- Susi, Roman, 1895
- Stumme des Himmels, Roman, 1895
- Zum Zeitvertreib, Roman, 1897
- Faustulus, Roman, 1898
- Neue Beiträge zur Theorie und Technik der Epik und Dramatik, 1898
- Opfer, Roman, 1899
- Freigeboren, Roman, 1900
