= Prerow =

- Municipality
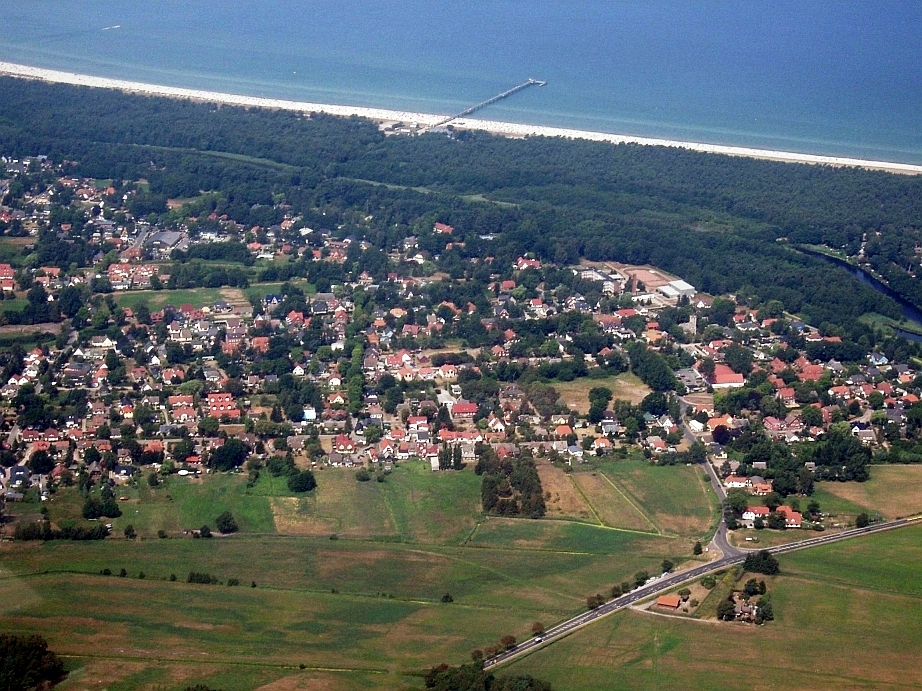
- Aerial view of Prerow, peninsula of Darß

- Location of Prerow within Vorpommern-Rügen district
- Interactive map of Prerow
- Location within Germany Location within Mecklenburg-Vorpommern
- Coordinates: 54°26′49″N 12°34′04″E
- Country: Germany
- State: Mecklenburg-Vorpommern
- District: Vorpommern-Rügen
- Municipal assoc.: Darß/Fischland

Government
  - Mayor: Renè Roloff

Area
  - Total: 11.24 km^{2} (4.34 sq mi)
- Elevation: 3 m (9.8 ft)

Population (2025-12-31)
  - Total: 1,324
  - Density: 117.8/km^{2} (305.1/sq mi)
- Time zone: UTC+01:00 (CET)
  - Summer (DST): UTC+02:00 (CEST)
- Postal codes: 18375
- Dialling codes: 038233
- Vehicle registration: NVP
- Website: www.ostseebad-prerow.de

Prerow (German pronunciation: [ˈpʁeːʁoː]) is a municipality in the district of Vorpommern-Rügen in the German state of Mecklenburg-Vorpommern. This Baltic seaside resort on the Darß peninsula is located about halfway between the historic Hanseatic towns of Rostock and Stralsund. It is one of three main settlements on the Darß, the others being the villages of Born and Wieck. Prerow has fine, sandy beaches and a picturesque landscape. It is hard to say where the forest ends and the village begins. The primeval Darß Forest has over 50 km of footpaths and cycle ways, a bridleway and tracks for horse-drawn carriages. West of the forest is West Beach with rugged terrain formed by wind and waves. South of Prerow is the bodden countryside. Visitors can take trips on a steam paddle boat and experience wildlife first-hand, nesting areas and various birds as the seasons change.

The seaside resort of Prerow is located within the Western Pomerania Lagoon Area National Park which stretches from Ahrenshoop along the southern coast to the island of Hiddensee.

Prerow itself was a fishing village, but has now been a seaside resort for over 130 years. Thanks to its varied climatic environment with the sea, meadows, forest and reeds, combined with good water quality, it was always recognised as a health spa. In 1998, the Minister of Social and Economic Affairs officially recognized the village as a seaside and health resort.

== Sights ==
The village of Prerow, with over 1,600 inhabitants, has become the largest village on the Darß. Its typical thatched roof cottages are well-preserved and have long given the village a serene charm. Prerow boasts the oldest lighthouse in Germany; it celebrated its 160th anniversary in 2008. The other famous landmark, the "Seafarers' Church", is over 280 years old. It is the oldest building on the Darß peninsula, and was built in 1726/28. It is also the oldest Lutheran church in the region. It hosts Evangelical-Lutheran and Roman Catholic services as well as art exhibitions, guided tours, classical concerts and other special events.

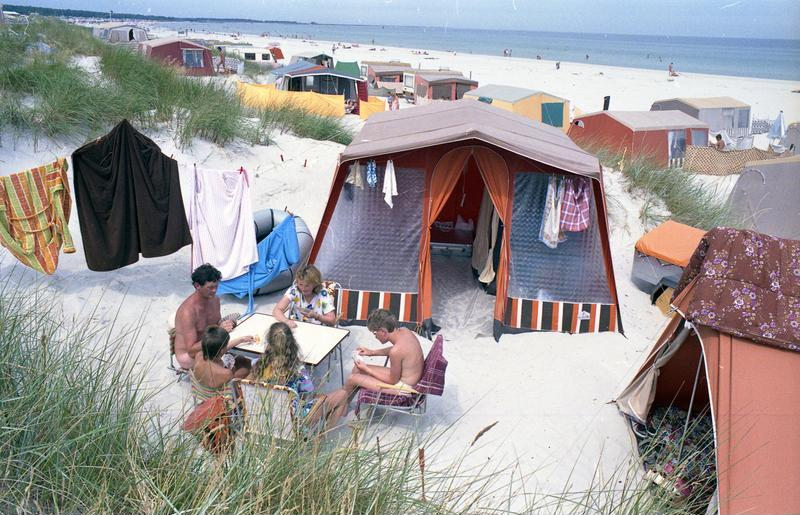
Camping on the beach at Prerow in 1990

The Darß Museum was founded in 1953 and various events are held here during the summer months. The museum displays the culture of the region, dominated by its countryside by the sea. Its exhibition contains information about geological history, traditional sailing boats, typical architectural style, flora and fauna. On Fridays, members of staff speak to all guests in the traditional local language, Low German.

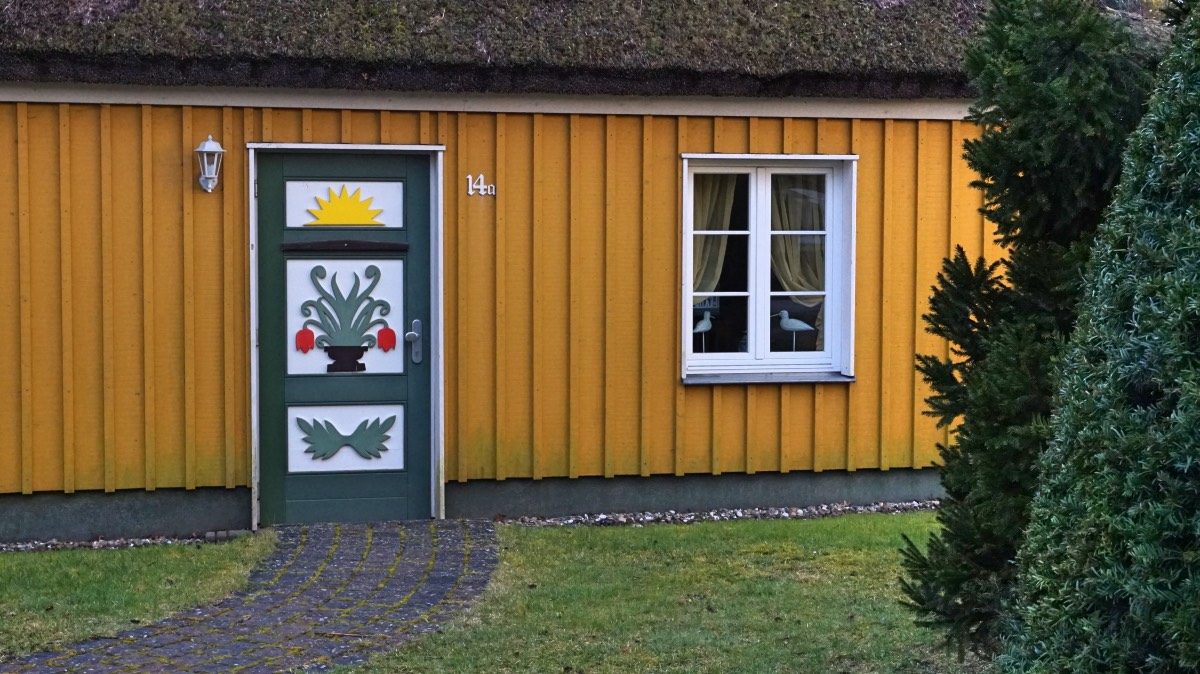
Traditional house in Prerow

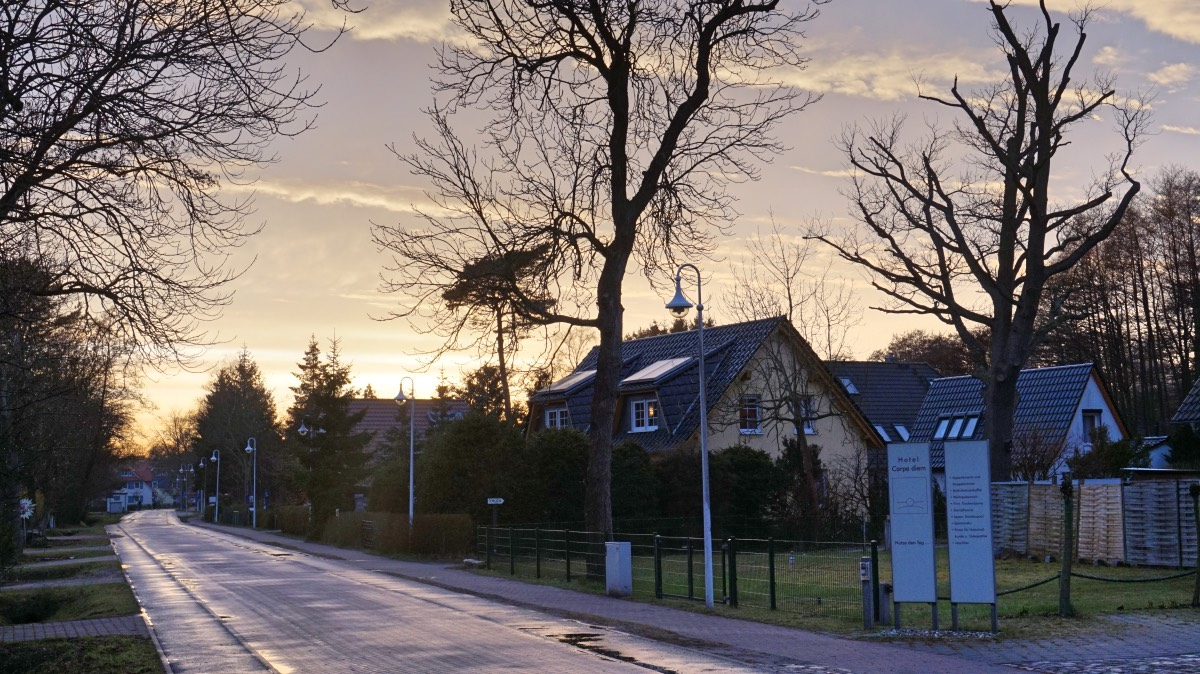
Prerow in the evening.

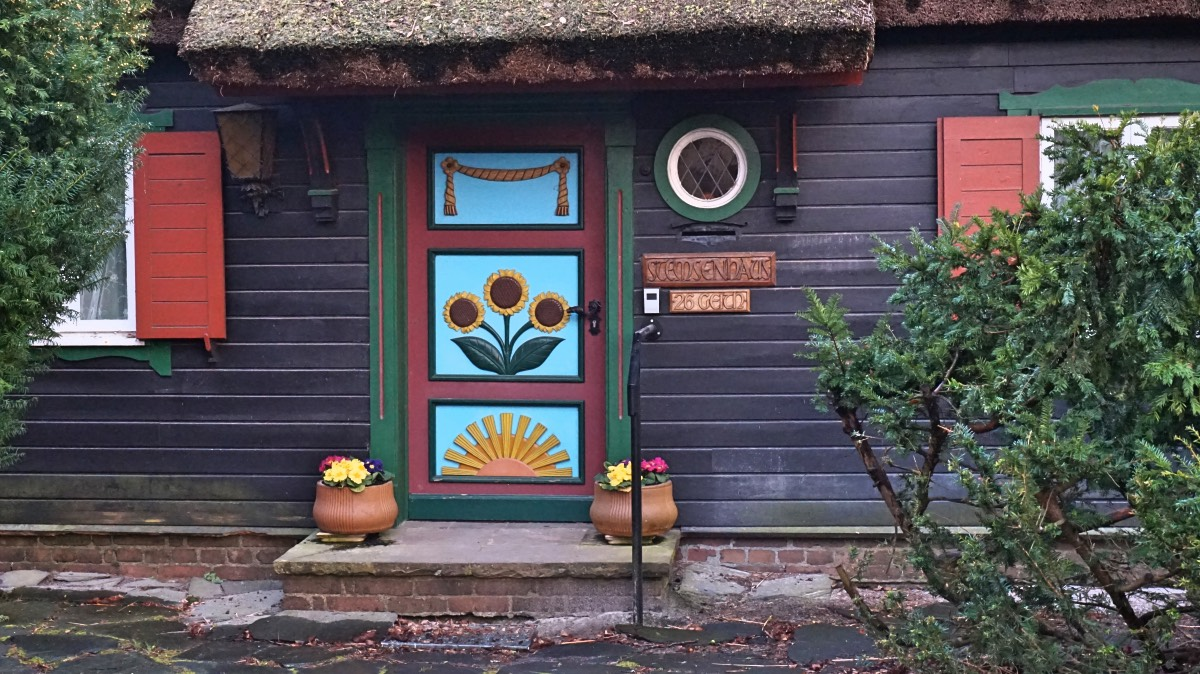
Traditional house in Prerow

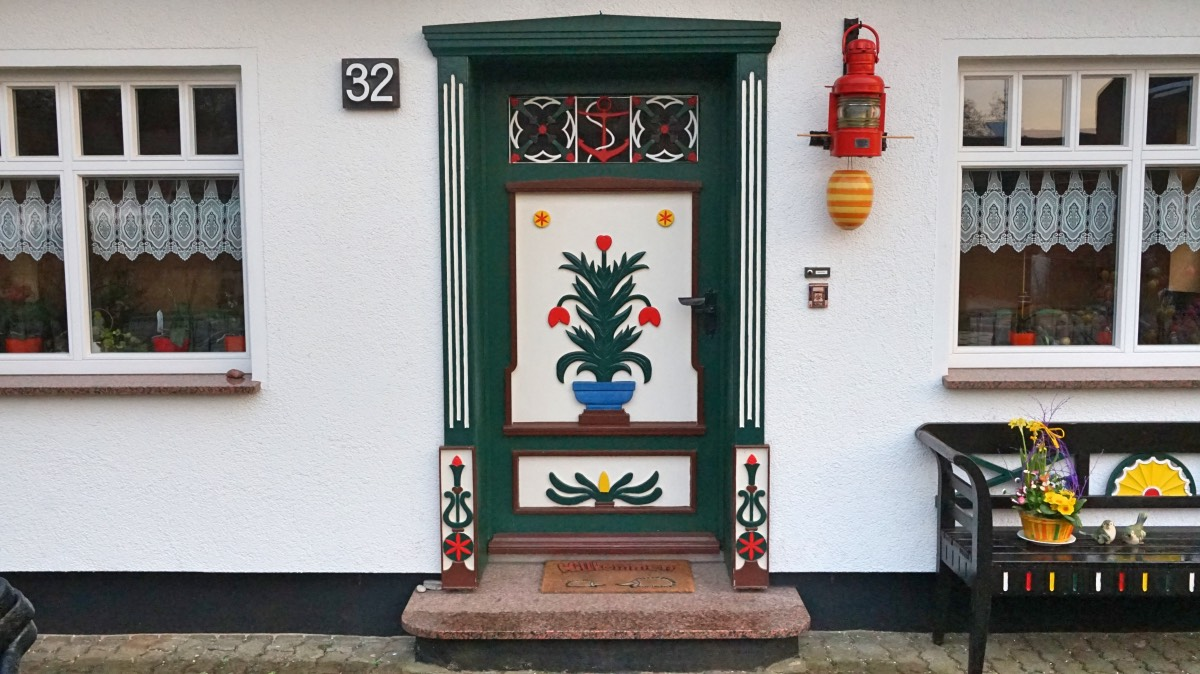
Traditional house in Prerow

== History of tourism ==
After the great storm surge of 1872, an intense development of tourism began. Within a few years the number of visitors had risen enormously. The publican, Herrmann Scharmberg, first organized simple swimming facilities. On 12 November 1878 he asked the royal government of Stralsund to establish a Baltic seaside spa. His request was granted. Two years later, in 1880, eighty visitors made their way to the village, which at the time had a population of approximately 1,550. The date is celebrated as the admission of Prerow into the circle of the Baltic resorts. In 2010, Prerow, as the second biggest resort in this region, celebrated 130 years as a seaside resort.

== Personality related to the place ==
- Bogislaus von Rosen (1572-1658), Swedish merchant and governor, born in Prerow
- Erich Heckel (1883-1970), painted in summer 1911 in Prerow
- Dietmar Bartsch (born 1958), politician (The Left), lives in Prerow
- Sebastian Hämer (born 1979), singer, grew up in Prerow
