= Friedrich Wachenhusen =

German landscape artist, draftsman and etcher (1859–1925)

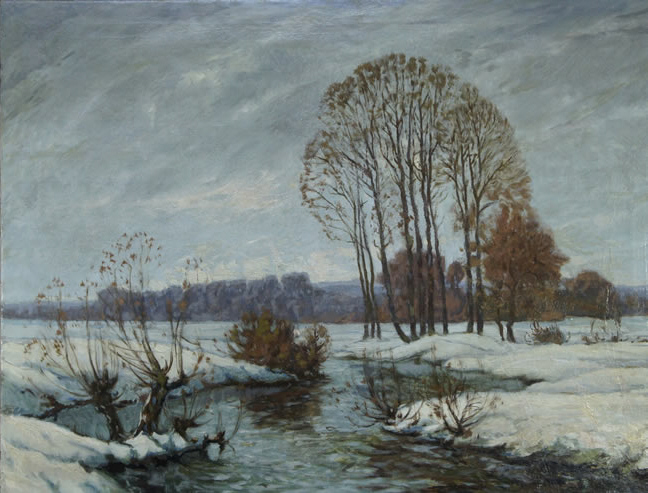
- Auf dem Darss
- Born: 27 May 1859; Schwerin, Mecklenburg, Germany
- Died: 2 May 1925 (aged 65); Schwerin, Mecklenburg, Germany
- Occupations: landscape artist, draftsman and etcher

Adolf Friedrich Wilhelm Wachenhusen (27 May 1859 – 2 May 1925) was a German landscape artist, draftsman and etcher. The focus of his work was on the countryside of his home region, Mecklenburg.

== Life ==
At the urging of his father, a Schwerin ministerial secretary, Wachenhusen went after attending high school in Schwerin in 1880 to study architecture at the Polytechnikum Karlsruhe. He moved in 1881 to the Academy in Karlsruhe, to study painting. After the change in 1884 to the Grand Ducal Saxon School of Arts of Weimar, he continued to study under the landscape painter Theodor Hagen. In 1889 he moved to Berlin, attended the Academy of Fine Arts and painted a year with Eugen Bracht. Then he worked as head of a drawing and painting school in Berlin. Since 1889 he was also a member of the Association of Berlin Artists. In 1892 to 1895 Wachenhusen had several stays in Ahrenshoop on the Baltic Sea. Here together with Paul Müller-Kaempff he ran the painting school of St Lukas during the summer months. Müller-Kaempff lived here since 1892. Study trips led Wachenhusen 1892 to northern Italy and in 1894 to Holland, where he was in Volendam and the artists' colony Katwijk.

On March 1, 1897, Wachenhusen married the Dresden opera singer Eva Baroness von Gillern. In the same year Wachenhusen built his house to his own plans on "Schifferberg 10" in Ahrenshoop. As well as Müller-Kaempff, fellow artists Anna Gerresheim, Elisabeth von Eicken and de:Fritz Grebe had already settled here before him. It was soon the Ahrenshoop artists' colony, whose founders also include Wachenhusen. He counted with the painters Theobald Schorn and Paul Müller-Kaempff among the founders of Ahrenshooper Kunstkaten (art cottage) which opened 1909. In the meantime Wachenhusen had from about 1903 a residence in Hamburg, where he also led a painting school. After the death of his wife in 1910 he married in 1912 his second wife, the 20 years younger Lucie Schindowski, a former painting student. In 1909 he was appointed professor by the Grand Duke of Mecklenburg.

Wachenhusen left Ahrenshoop with the end of World War I in 1918. His house and that next to it, the "Dünenhaus" (dune house), where he have had his own sommer painting school, were sold in 1920. He lived now mostly in his home in Schwerin-Görries. After his death in 1925 the urn funeral took place on the "Schifferfriedhof" (skipper-graveyard) of Ahrenshoop. In 1926 a Memorial exhibition take place in the Mecklenburg State Museum Schwerin.

The works of Wachenhusen are applied in the painting manner of Impressionism. They included next to the mainly landscapes also forest and animal motifs, which is certainly due to his passion for hunting. Wachenhusen was, in addition to the membership of the Association of Berlin Artists, member of the General German Arts Cooperative, the Association of German Illustrators, in the Association for Original Etching in Berlin, the Hamburger Kunstverein von 1817 (Art Association), the Hamburger Künstlerverein von 1832 (Artist Association) and the Association for Mecklenburg History and Archaeology. He was an honorary member of the Académie des Beaux-Arts in Paris.

== Works (selection) ==
Wachenhusen was regularly represented with his works between 1884 and 1914 at the well known exhibitions of the Royal Academy of Arts in Berlin, and the "Great Art Exhibition Berlin". He also shows his landscapes at the Mecklenburg Art Exhibition in 1911 and in the Munich Glass Palace (1891). He had his first solo exhibition in 1902 at the Hamburger Kunstverein von 1817.

- Mond über dem Bodden (Moon over the lagoon)
- Hof im Mecklenburgischen (Farm in Mecklenburg)
- Steilküste bei Ahrenshoop (Steep coast near Ahrenshoop)
- Mecklenburgische Winterlandschaft (1887) (Winter landscape)
- Am Schweriner See (1890) (On the Lake Schwerin)
- Blick zur Ahrenshooper Mühle (1900) (View to the Mill)
- Aus Ahrenshoop (1902)
- Dorfstraße im Schnee (1910) (Village road in snow)
- Rügener Küste (1911) (Coast of Rügen)
- Paar am Hafen von Volendam (around 1894) (Couple at the harbor of Volendam)
- Mappenwerke: Verlag Kähler Hamburg, 1902: Malerisches aus Hamburg, Aus Lübeck und Umgebung, Von Cuxhaven nach Helgoland
  (3 Folders with Lithographs from Northern Germany)
