= Paul Müller-Kaempff =

German painter, illustrator and lithographer

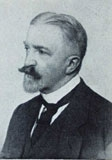
- Born: 16 October 1861; Oldenburg
- Died: 5 December 1941 (aged 80); Berlin

Paul Müller-Kaempff (1861–1941) was a German painter, illustrator and lithographer. He is associated with the Düsseldorf school of painting.

== Biography ==
Kaempff received his first training from 1883 to 1886 at the Düsseldorf Academy of Fine Arts, then at the Academy of Karlsruhe under Gustav Schönleber (1851–1917) and finally at the Berlin Academy in the studio of Hans Gude (1825–1903).

In 1905 he married his student, Else Schwager, and was appointed professor a year later. From 1908 he lived in Hamburg, later becoming a member of the Hamburg Artists Association. In 1904 he and his wife were founder members of the Oldenburg Art Society.

Müller-Kaempff was a successful landscape artist. He produced watercolours, pastels and drawings as well as furniture designs and a multitude of postcards. He was also an accomplished lithographer and produced bird illustrations for the revised edition of Naumann's "Naturgeschichte der Vögel Mitteleuropas". During his lifetime his works were acquired by museums in Rostock, Oldenburg, Kiel and Hamburg, and bought by numerous private collectors as far afield as Argentina and China. Prince Eitel Friedrich, the second son of Emperor Wilhelm II, acquired several of Müller-Kaempff's pieces for the imperial court in 1908. Müller-Kaempff stayed in touch with his former fellow-student, Georg Müller vom Siel, and visited him at Dötlingen in June 1908.

On a hike in 1889 with his friend, Oskar Frenzel (1855–1915), they discovered the secluded fishing village of Ahrenshoop. Müller-Kaempff was so inspired by the isolated hamlet that he moved there, built himself a house in 1892, and started the painting school of St. Lucas in 1894. Fellow artists followed his lead, and soon the artists' colony was home to Anna Gerresheim (1852–1921), Elisabeth von Eicken (1862–1940), Friedrich Wachenhusen (1859–1925), Fritz Grebe (1850–1924), Heinrich Schlotermann (1859–1922), Theobald Schorn (1866–1913) and Hugo Richter-Lefensdorf (1854–1904).

== Selected paintings ==
Farmstead with Cornfield

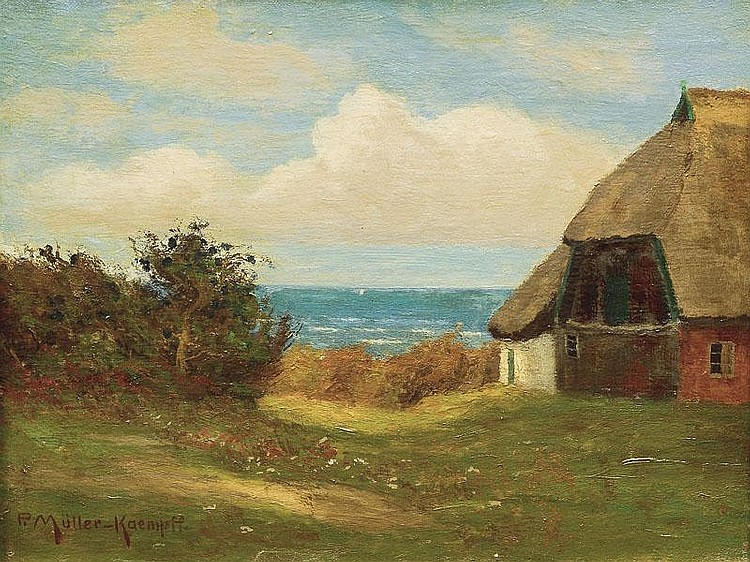
The Baltic Sea near Ahrenshoop

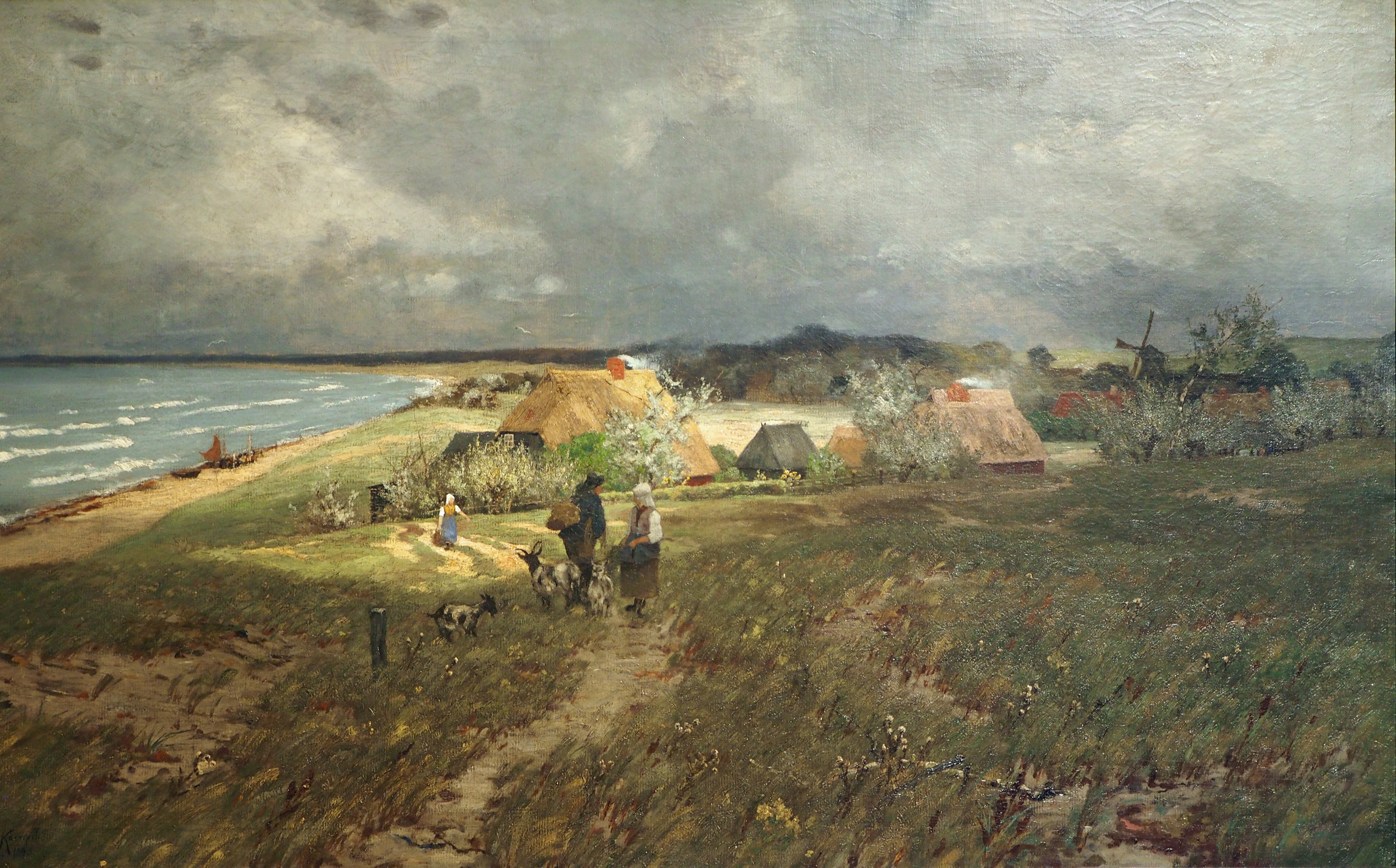
The High Path at Ahrenshoop

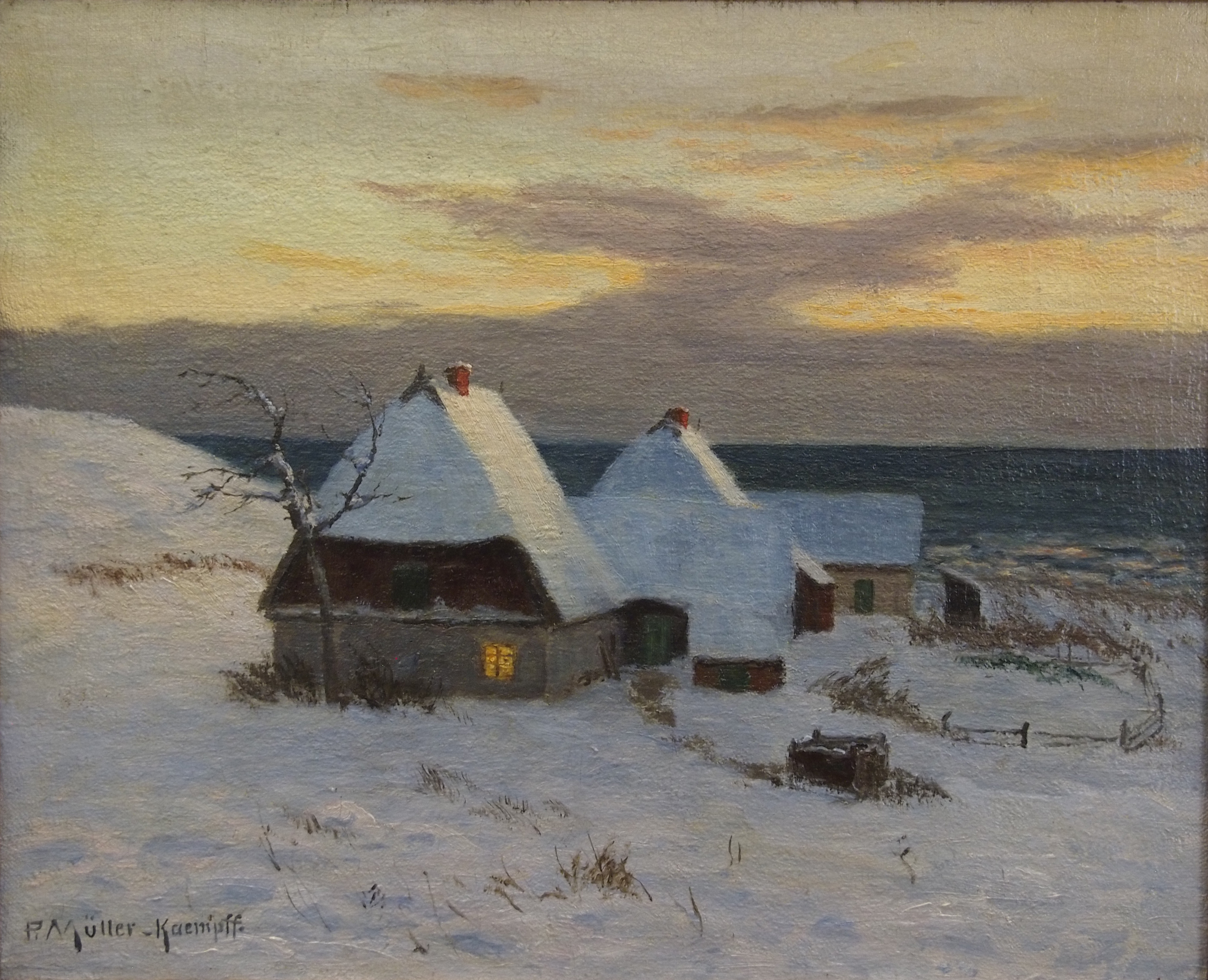
Darß Winter

== Sources ==
- Paul Müller-Kaempff: "Erinnerungen an Ahrenshoop" In: Mecklenburgische Monatshefte, Schwerin, Bd. 2 (1926), 7, S. 333–336. (Digitalized)
- Konrad Mahlfeld: Paul Müller-Kaempff. Begründer der Künstlerkolonie Ahrenshoop. Hasenverlag, Halle (Saale) 2010, ISBN 978-3-939468-54-7.
- Wolf Karge: Paul Müller-Kaempff : 1841 Oldenburg – Ahrenshoop – Berlin 1941. Mit einem Beitrag von Friedrich Schulz, Verlag Atelier im Bauernhaus, Fischerhude 2006, ISBN 3-88132-268-X.
- Paul Müller-Kaempff. In: Ulrich Thieme, Felix Becker u. a.: Allgemeines Lexikon der Bildenden Künstler von der Antike bis zur Gegenwart. Vol. XXV, E. A. Seemann, Leipzig 1931, S. 245.
- Paul Müller-Kaempff. In: Hans Vollmer: Allgemeines Lexikon der bildenden Künstler des XX. Jahrhunderts. Vol. 5. E. A. Seemann, Leipzig 1961, S. 409
