= Museum of Cultural History =

Museum of Cultural History may refer to:

- Fowler Museum at UCLA, in Los Angeles, California
- Museum of Cultural History, Oslo, Norway
- Museum of Cultural History, Rostock, Mecklenburg-Vorpommern, Germany
