= Oskar Frenzel =

German painter (1855–1915)

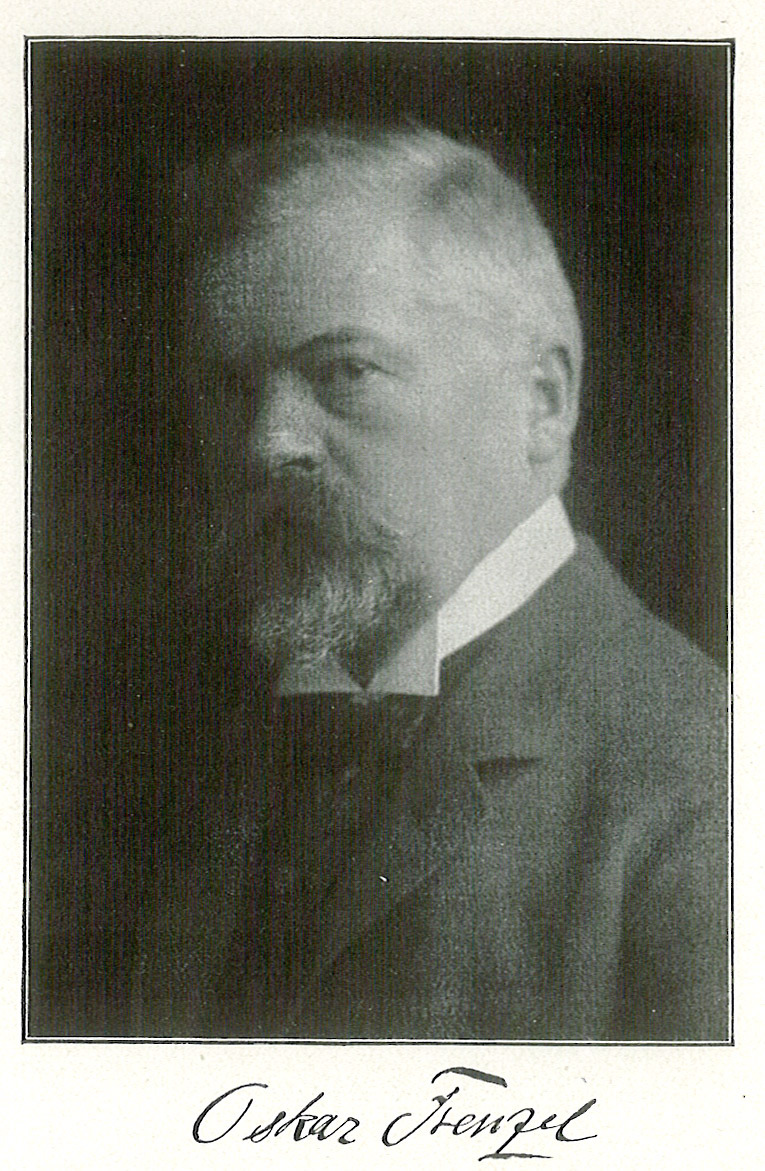
- Born: 12 November 1855; Berlin, Kingdom of Prussia
- Died: 15 May 1915 (aged 59); Berlin, Kingdom of Prussia, German Empire
- Occupations: landscape painter, animal painter and lithographer

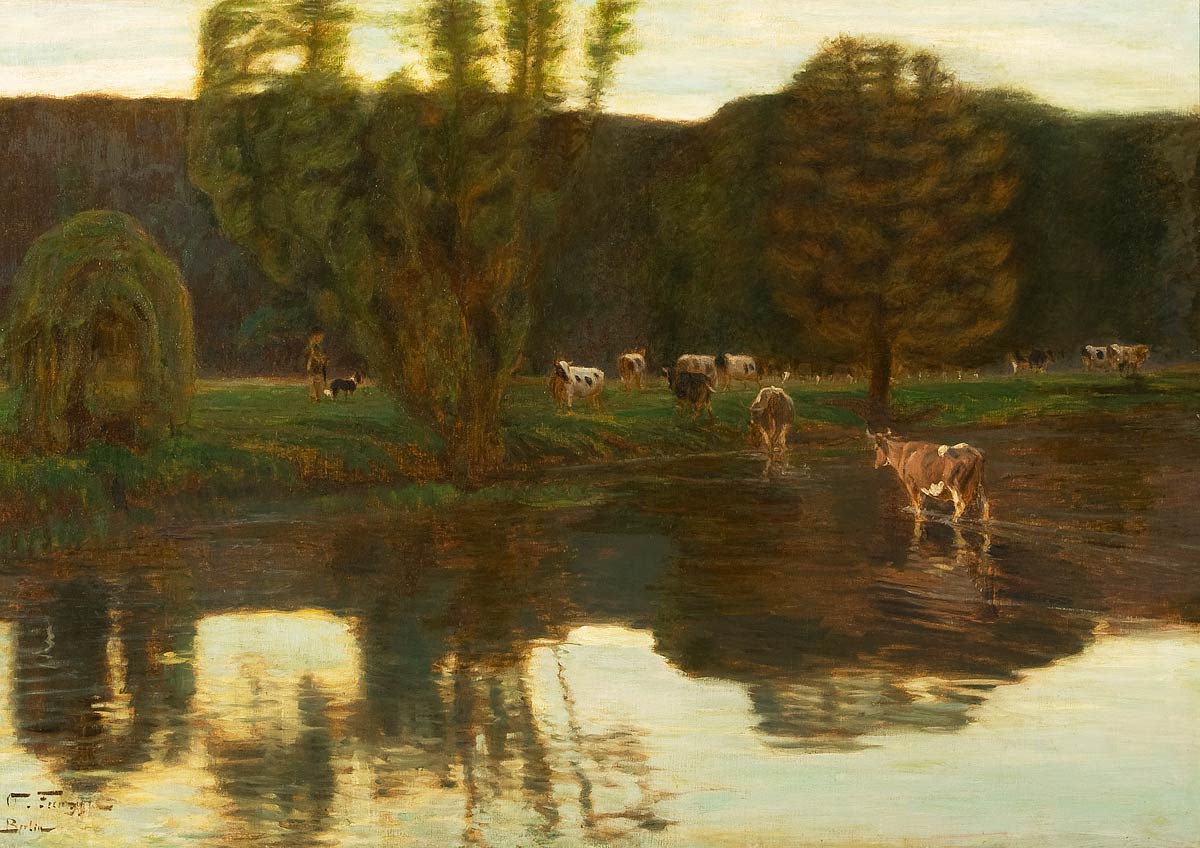
Cows at a Ford

Oskar Frenzel (12 November 1855 – 15 May 1915) was a German landscape-artist, animal painter and lithographer.

== Life ==
Frenzel was originally a lithographer. He became an animal and landscape painter in addition to his work as a lithographer from 1879 in the evening classes of the teaching institute of Museum of Decorative Arts Berlin. Between 1884 and 1889, he studied at the Prussian Academy of Arts in Berlin under Paul Friedrich Meyerheim and Eugen Bracht. With his colleague Paul Müller-Kaempff in 1889 he "discovered" the fishing village of Ahrenshoop on the Baltic Sea, where an artists' colony emerged in the following years.

He won first prizes at exhibitions in Berlin, such as in 1896 a large gold medal at the International Art Exhibition, Frenzel in 1898 co-founded the Berlin Secession and was a member of its committee. In 1902 he joined the Secession again and was from 1904 until his death a member of the Prussian Academy of Arts. His works were in the Alte Nationalgalerie (Old National Gallery) in Berlin, the Neue Pinakothek (New Pinakothek) in Munich and in the museums of Dresden, Königsberg, Magdeburg and Vienna.
