= Elisabeth von Eicken =

German painter (1862–1940)

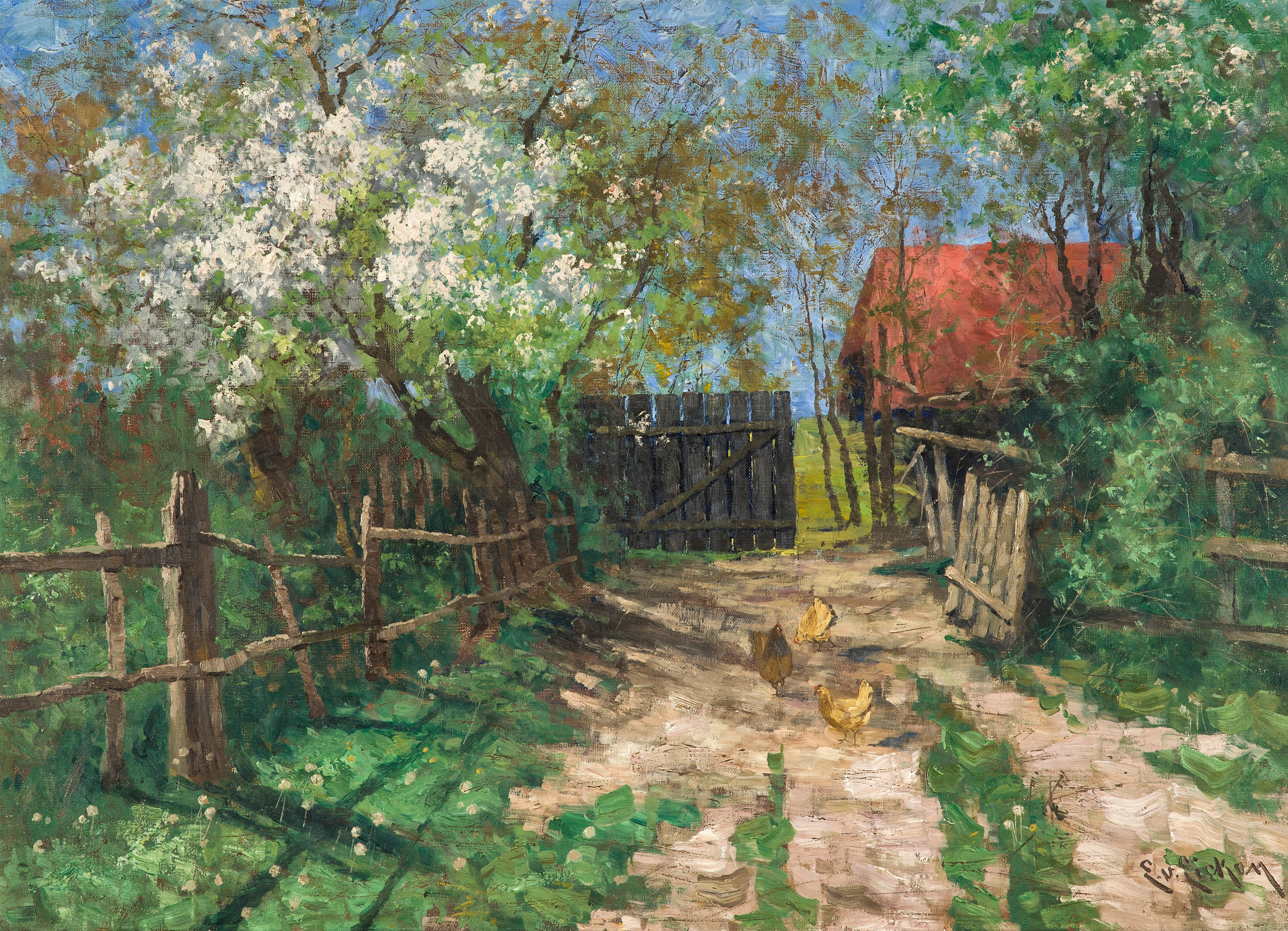
- Frühling (Spring)
- Born: 18 July 1862; Mülheim an der Ruhr, North Rhine-Westphalia, Germany
- Died: 21 July 1940 (aged 78); Potsdam, Brandenburg, Germany
- Occupation: landscape painter
- Spouse: Henry Edler von Paepke

Elisabeth von Eicken (18 July 1862 – 21 July 1940) was a German landscape painter.

== Life ==
Elisabeth von Eicken was born as the third daughter of Hermann Wilhelm von Eicken (1816–1873) and Anna Elisabeth Borchers (1836–1916) in Mülheim an der Ruhr. She attended the municipal lyceum "Luisenschule" in her hometown from 1871 to 1878. After studying in Merano, Menton, Geneva and Berlin she continued her training in Paris with Edmond Yon. In this period she was strongly influenced, in her landscape painting, by the Barbizon School and by Alfred Sisley.

From 1894 von Eicken worked as a freelancer in the artists' colony at Ahrenshoop and in Berlin-Grunewald. In 1894 she built a house in Ahrenshoop, where she was close to the founders of the artists' colony, including Paul Müller-Kaempff, Friedrich Wachenhusen, Anna Gerresheim and Fritz Grebe. In Berlin she was regularly represented, from 1894, at the Great Berlin Art Exhibition, and also on international art exhibitions including in Munich, Paris and St Louis). She was a member of the Association of Berlin Woman Artists and the General German Arts Cooperative. In 1895 she married Henry Edler von Paepke, the lord of the manor of Quassel near Lübtheen in Mecklenburg.

== Works (selection) ==
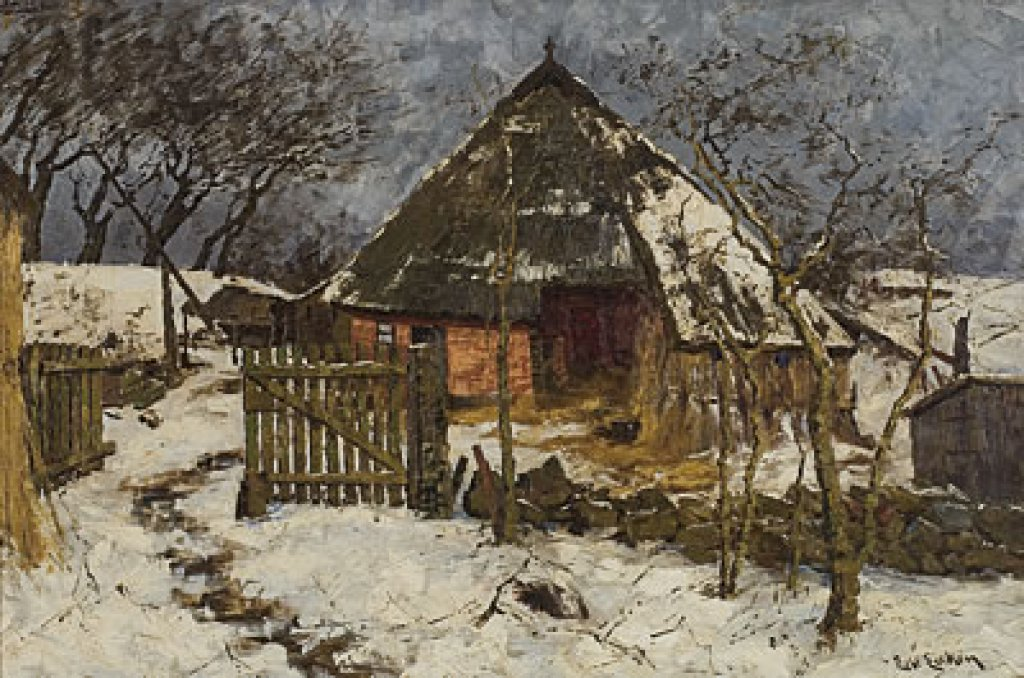
Das Dornenhaus in winterlichem Tauschnee (The Thorns House in Wintry Thawing Snow)

Great Berlin Art Exhibition

- 1894: Waldeinsamkeit (Forest Loneliness); Aus der Picardie (From the Picardy); Regenstimmung – in Ahrenshoop (Rain mood)
- 1895: Bauernhof in Mecklenburg (Farm); Die letzten Blätter (The last Leafs); Tannenwald (Forest Firs); Birken im Spätherbst (Birch trees in the late fall)
- 1896: Wenn die Natur zur Ruhe geht (When nature comes to rest); Unser deutscher Wald (Our German Forest); Waldeszauber (Forest Magic)
- 1897: Memento mori; Herbst im Walde (Autumn in the Forest)); Auf der InseI Bornholm (On the Bornholm island); Waldesweben (Forest Weaving) (Watercolor); Das Geheimnis des Waldes (The secret of the forest) (W); Dorfmotiv im Nebel (Village Scene in Fog) (W)
- 1898: Octobermorgen im Walde (October Morning in the Forest); Im Spätherbst (Later Autumn) (W); Am Entenpfuhl (On the Dug Mudhole) (W)
- 1899: Im Schutz der Dünen (Under the protection of Dunes); Das Geheimnis des Waldes (The secret of the forest); Herbst-Eiche (Autumn-Oak) (W)
- 1901: Waldeinsamkeit (Forest Loneliness); Herbstgedanken (Autumn Thoughts) (W)
- 1902: Im Steinweld; Im Dorf (In the Village); Herbstgedanken (W)
- 1903: Im tiefen Schweigen liegt die Natur (The Nature is in deep Silence)
- 1904: Grenshooyer Friedhof (Cemetery) (Tempera)
- 1906: Ein stiller Winkel (A silent Corner)
- 1910: Stille am Bach (Silence on the Creek)
- 1912: Waldbach (Forest Creek)

== See also ==
- List of German women artists
