= Max Dungert =

German painter (1896–1945)

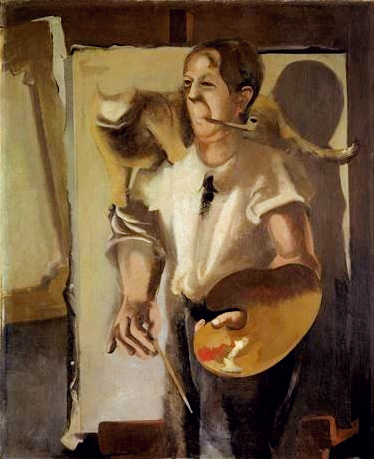
Self-portrait with Easel (late 1920s)

Max Wilhelm Waldemar Dungert (3 September 1896, Magdeburg - April/May 1945, Berlin) was a German painter and graphic artist.

== Life and work ==
He was born to Ferdinand Dungert, a police courier, and his wife Betty Elise née Koehler. From 1910, he attended the Kunstgewerbeschule Magdeburg, where he studied with Rudolf Bosselt and Adolf Rettelbusch, among others. In 1919, he was one of the co-founders of a short-lived artists' association known as "Die Kugel" (The Sphere); devoted to Expressionist art. Its membership included Bruno Beye, Wilhelm Höpfner, August Bratfisch. After 1920, his works would briefly display a trend toward Realism.

In 1921, he went to Berlin and joined the Novembergruppe, another association of Expressionist artists and architects. Later, he would also create works in the Cubist style. During the next few years, he occasionally shared a studio with Beye. From 1925 to 1928, he made several study trips to Italy, France, and Switzerland. He established his own private drawing school in 1930, and joined "Porza" (named after the city in Switzerland), an international association for intellectual and artistic exchanges.

During the Nazi regime, in 1937, several of his works were confiscated as part of the campaign to identify and eliminate "Degenerate Art". He was drafted into military service in 1944. His studio and many of his works were destroyed not long after. He was killed sometime during, or immediately following, the Battle of Berlin.

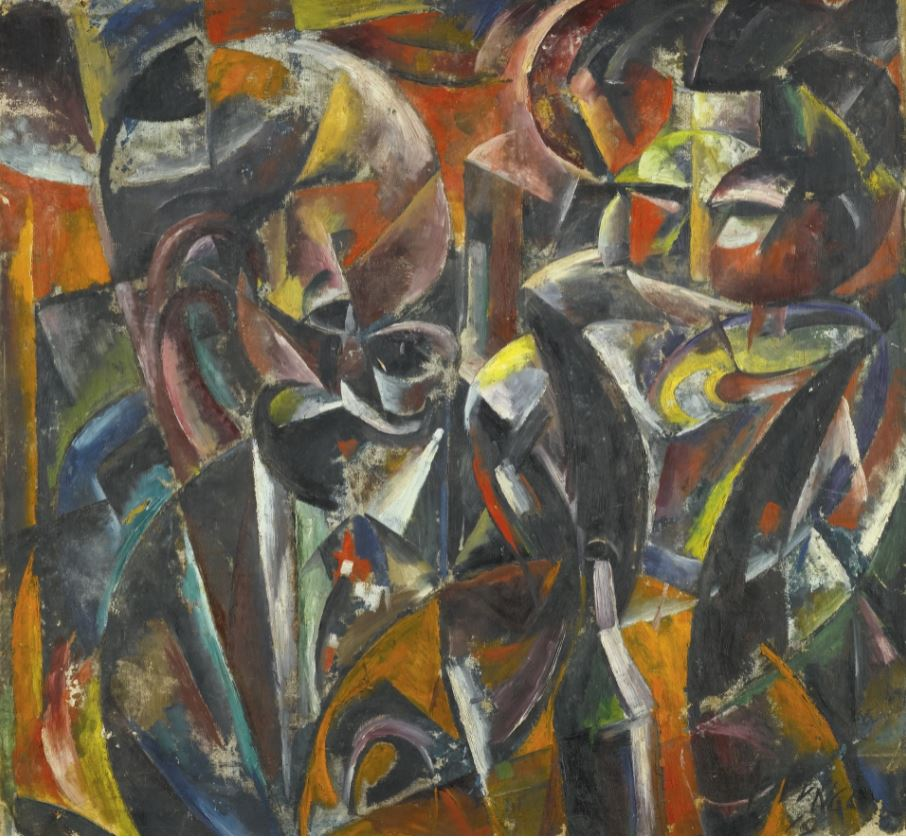
In the Café

In addition to his paintings, in 1925 he created stained glass windows for a dancing school operated by Berthe Trümpy (1895–1983), which were destroyed during the war. He also produced portrait sketches of notable musicians and composers, such as Kurt Weill, Paul Hindemith and the French singer, Yvette Guilbert.

His works may be seen at the Kulturhistorisches Museum Magdeburg, and the Berlinische Galerie. The city of Magdeburg has named a street after him.
