= Adolf Rettelbusch =

German painter

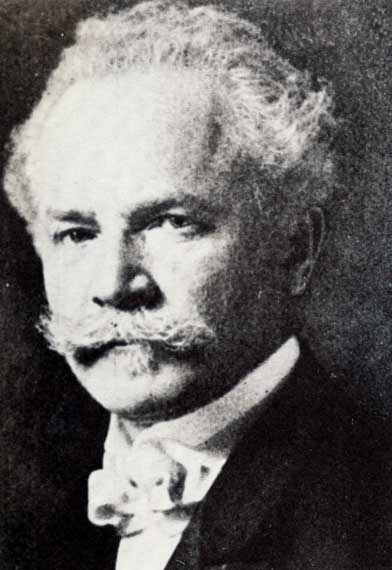
Adolf Rettelbusch (c.1910–1920)

Johann Adolf Rettelbusch (15 December 1858 – 8 January 1934) was a German painter. He was nicknamed the Brockenmaler, after Brocken, a peak in the Harz mountains, which became a major focus of his work after he took a trip there in 1888.

== Life ==
Rettelbusch was the eighth child born to a family of innkeepers. He was born in Kammerforst. After attending the local schools, he went to the Weimar Saxon-Grand Ducal Art School in 1878. Theodor Hagen and Alexander Struys were among his teachers. After trying several styles, he decided to devote himself to landscape painting. Before graduating, however, he had to quit school for financial reasons. In 1880 and 1881, he took lessons to pass the drawing teacher exams with Karl Gussow at the Prussian Academy of Arts.

Despite this, he remained unemployed. Returning to Kammerforst, he supported himself with an occasional odd job. In 1883, he was able to study at the Museum of Decorative Arts in Berlin, thanks to a generous stipend from Max Friedrich Koch and Ernst Ewald. He acquired skills in landscape, portrait, and decorative painting, receiving several awards.

In 1886 and 1887, he took a study trip to Italy. The drawings and watercolors he made there led to a job offer from the Prussian Ministry of Trade and Industry, teaching decorative painting at the new arts and crafts school in Magdeburg. He began work in 1887 and later became vice-rector under the engineer Eduard Spieß. By 1892, he was Acting Manager of the school. In 1906, he was appointed a Professor and remained there until his retirement in 1924.

He was also involved in the cultural life of Magdeburg. In 1893, he founded the Artists' Association of St. Luke and was its president for many years. Nine years later, he founded the Artists' Association of Börde (a region in Northern Germany). He was an active member of the Masonic Lodge.

He died in 1934 in Magdeburg. A street in that town is named after him.

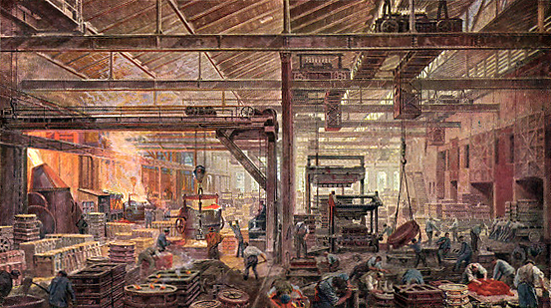
Krupp AG Grusonwerk, steel foundry

== Work ==
Although he is primarily known as a landscape painter, his more than 4,000 canvases dealt in a wide variety of subjects, including the First World War and the Krupp-Gruson armaments factory. Every year, he produced a series of Brocken-related postcards. Hundreds of his works are in private collections, and many were destroyed in World War II, but a large selection may be seen at the Magdeburg Cultural History Museum and the Rennstieg-Hotel in Kammerforst, which is still operated by the Rettelbusch family.
