= Clara von Rappard =

Swiss painter (1857–1912)

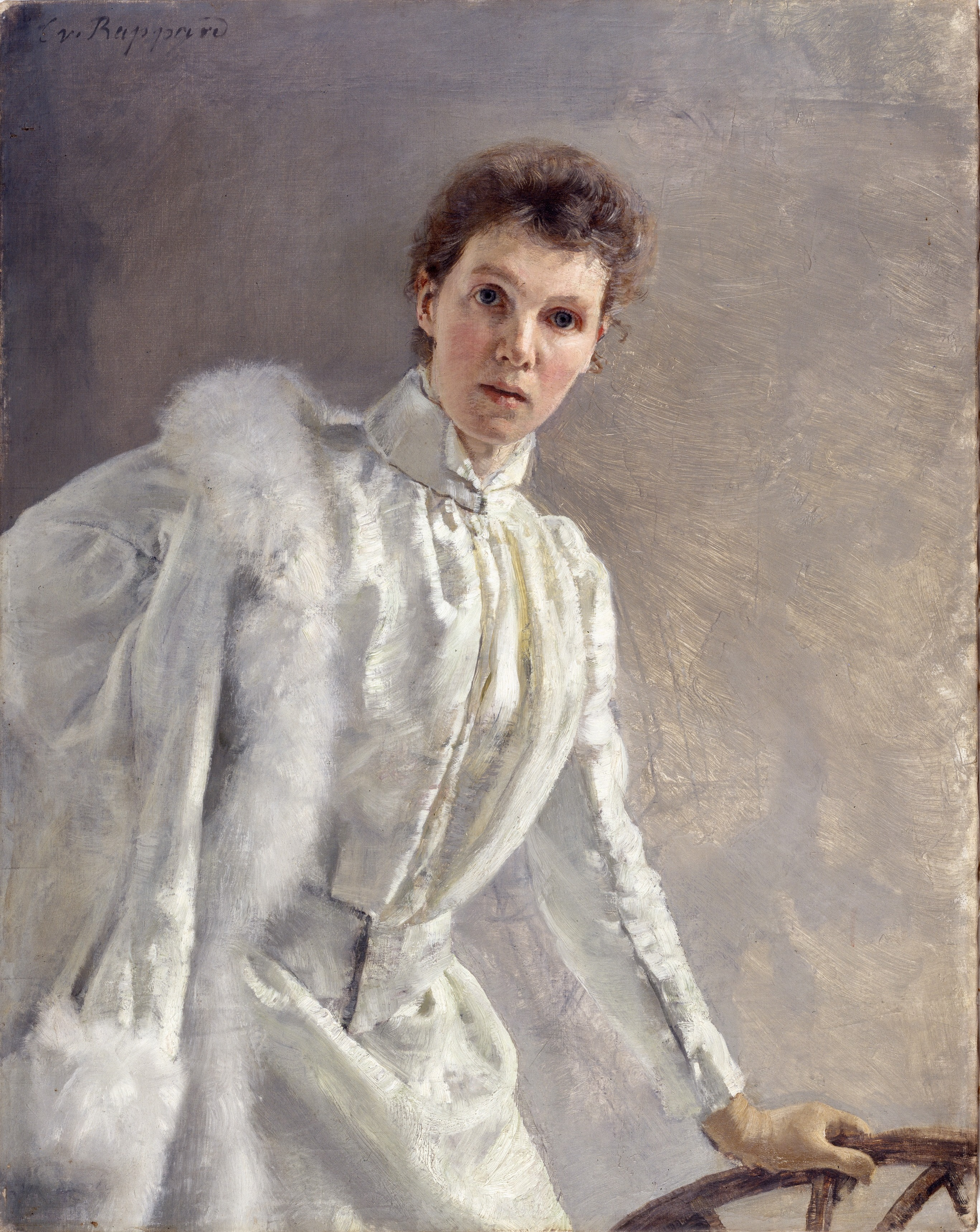
Self-portrait (1894)

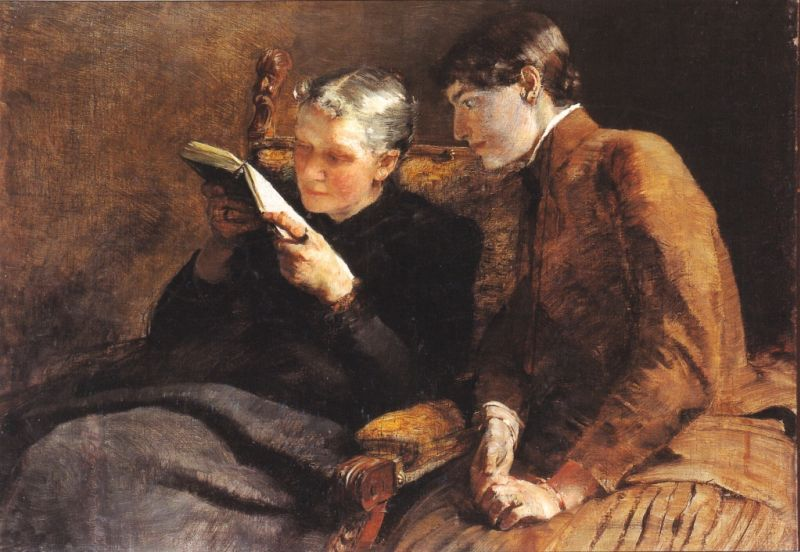
The Readers (1886)

Clara Julia Elisa von Rappard (19 May 1857 – 12 January 1912) was a Swiss painter. She worked in a wide variety of genres and materials including illustrations, etchings and murals, although she is best known for landscapes and portraits.

== Biography ==
Clara von Rappard was born on 19 May 1857 in Wabern bei Bern. She was the only child of Jurist Conrad von Rappard and Albertine Engell (1832–1922) of Mecklenburg, the younger sister of the writer and women's rights activist Juliane Engell-Günther. Her father also operated a microscopy institute (presumably related to forensics) and was co-owner, with his brother Hermann Gisbert von Rappard (1814–1902), of the Grandhotel Giessbach on Lake Brienz. She spent her formative years in Wabern bei Bern, then in Interlaken. Extensive travelling throughout Europe with her parents gave her an acquaintance with art and culture. Her artistic inclinations made themselves apparent at a relatively early age, and she was immediately given formal lessons.

From 1868 to 1869, she studied with Dominik Skutecký in Venice, from 1870 to 1871 with Heinrich Dreber in Rome, from 1871 to 1874 with Antonie Volkmar and Carl Steffeck in Berlin and, from 1875 to 1885 in the women's art school operated by Karl Gussow. In between, she also took lessons from Eduard Lürssen, Friedrich Kaulbach in Hanover, and at the school in the Kunstgewerbemuseum Berlin. During the 1880s, she also studied etching with Ludwig von Gleichen-Rußwurm. Other artists who participated, to a greater or lesser degree, in her education included Adolph von Menzel, Paul Friedrich Meyerheim, Arnold Böcklin and Eugène Burnand. For a brief period in the mid 1880s, she operated her own studio in Munich.

She exhibited widely throughout Western Europe and the United States, although she focused on German speaking areas. She held several solo showings there, including ones at the Kunsthalle Bremen (1894), Kunstverein Hannover (also 1894) and the Kunstmuseum Bern (1896). She took second place at the German Exhibition in London (1891) and received a gold medal at the International Women's Exhibition (also in London, 1900).

She died on 12 January 1912 in Bern from pneumonia, following a long illness.
