= Karl Gussow =

German painter (1843–1907)

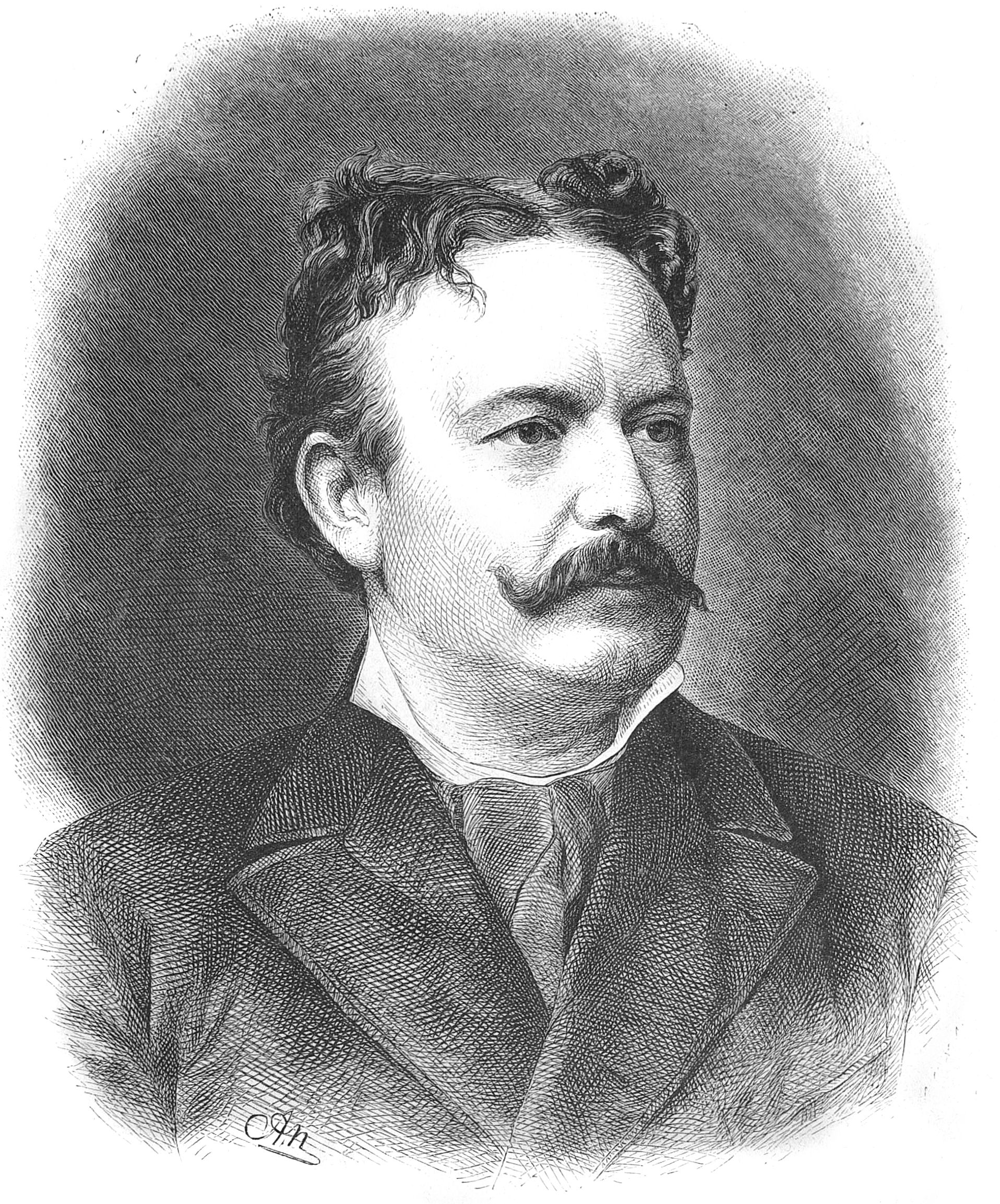
- Illustration of Karl Gussow from Die Gartenlaube (1881)
- Born: February 25, 1843; Havelberg
- Died: March 27, 1907 (aged 64); Munich

Karl Gussow (25 February 1843 – 27 March 1907) was a German painter and university professor.

== Life and work ==
He was born in Havelberg. His early inclination to art was encouraged by his family so, as soon as he completed his secondary schooling, he was enrolled at the newly founded Grand-Ducal Saxon Art School, Weimar. This led to studying the Dutch Masters in the studios of the history and genre painter, Arthur von Ramberg. He later worked with the Belgian history painter, Ferdinand Pauwels, who had a decisive influence on his style. In 1867, after leaving Pauwels' studio, he went to Munich to continue his studies with Karl von Piloty, but was there for only a short time before going to Italy, then returning to Weimar.

In 1870, he sent some works to an exhibition in Berlin. This attracted some positive critical attention, which led Count Stanislaus von Kalckreuth, a well known landscape painter, to offer him a professorship at the art school. He was there until 1874, when he accepted a similar position at the Academy of Fine Arts, Karlsruhe. After two years, he moved to the Prussian Academy of Arts. He resigned his position there in 1881, for undisclosed reasons. Two years later, he again went to Munich, where he taught at the Academy of Fine Arts, and established special classes for women, who could not be admitted to the academy at that time.

Among his students were Max Klinger, Hermann Prell, Carl von Marr, Adolf Rettelbusch, Ottilie Roederstein, Anna Gerresheim, and Clara von Rappard.

In style, he was a Realist. Anton von Werner, the Director of the Berlin Academy, said that "the exact reproduction of nature" was Gussow's ideal. He used specially designed brushes that enabled him to create more complex glazes. That type of brush is now known as the "Gussow-Pinsel".

Gussow died in Munich on 27 March 1907.

== Selected paintings ==
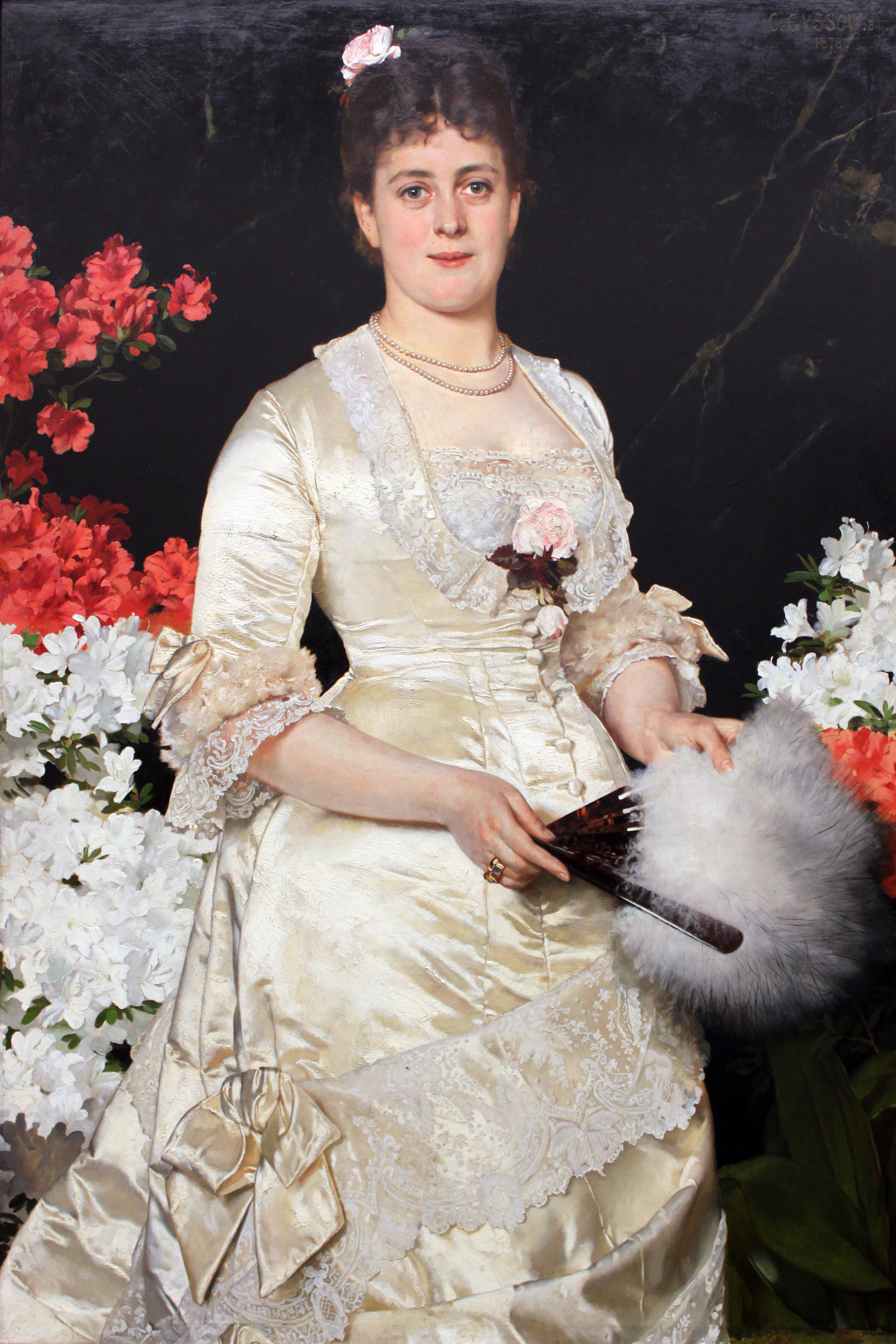
Hedwig Woworsky, 1878

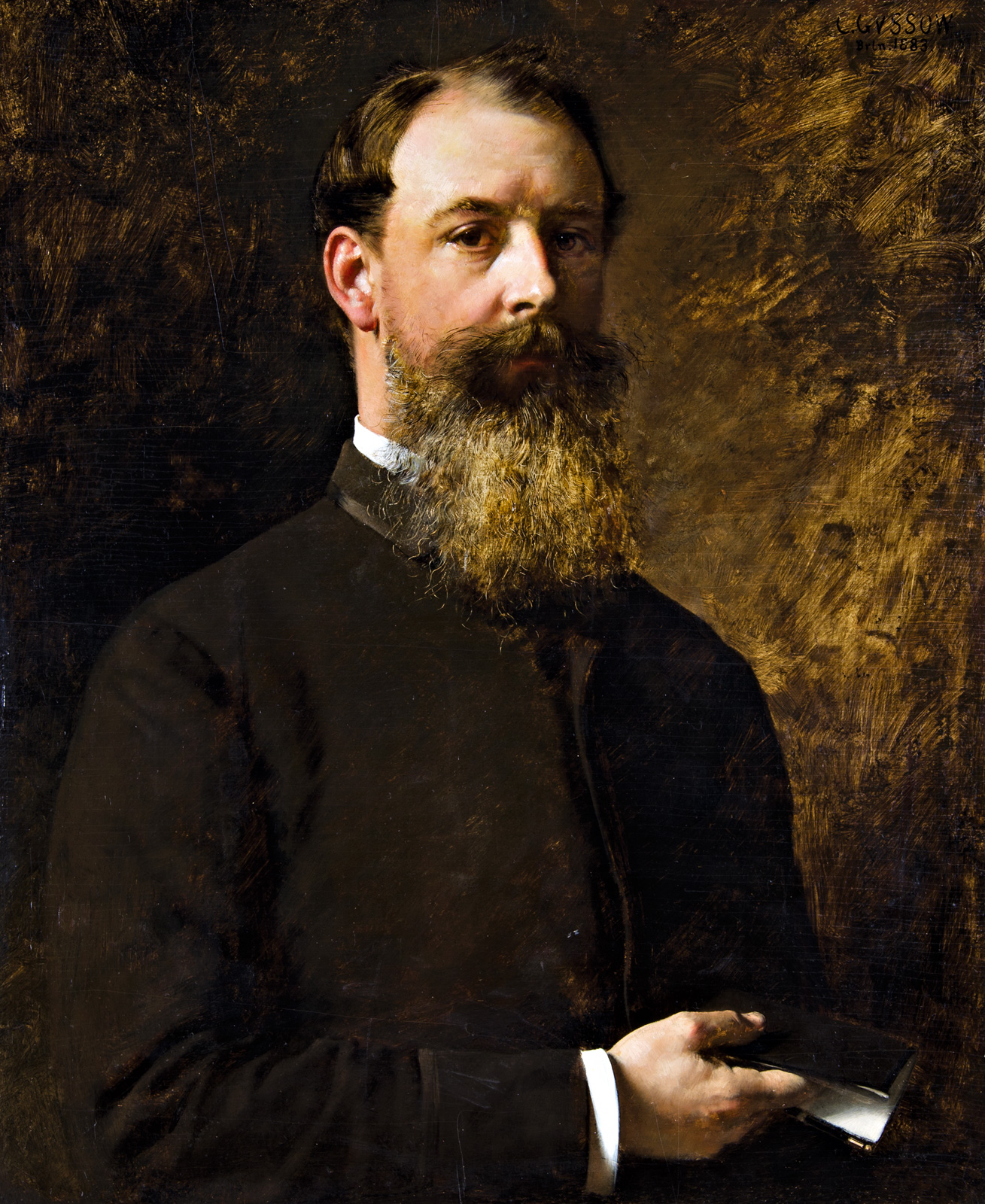
Portrait of a Man, 1883

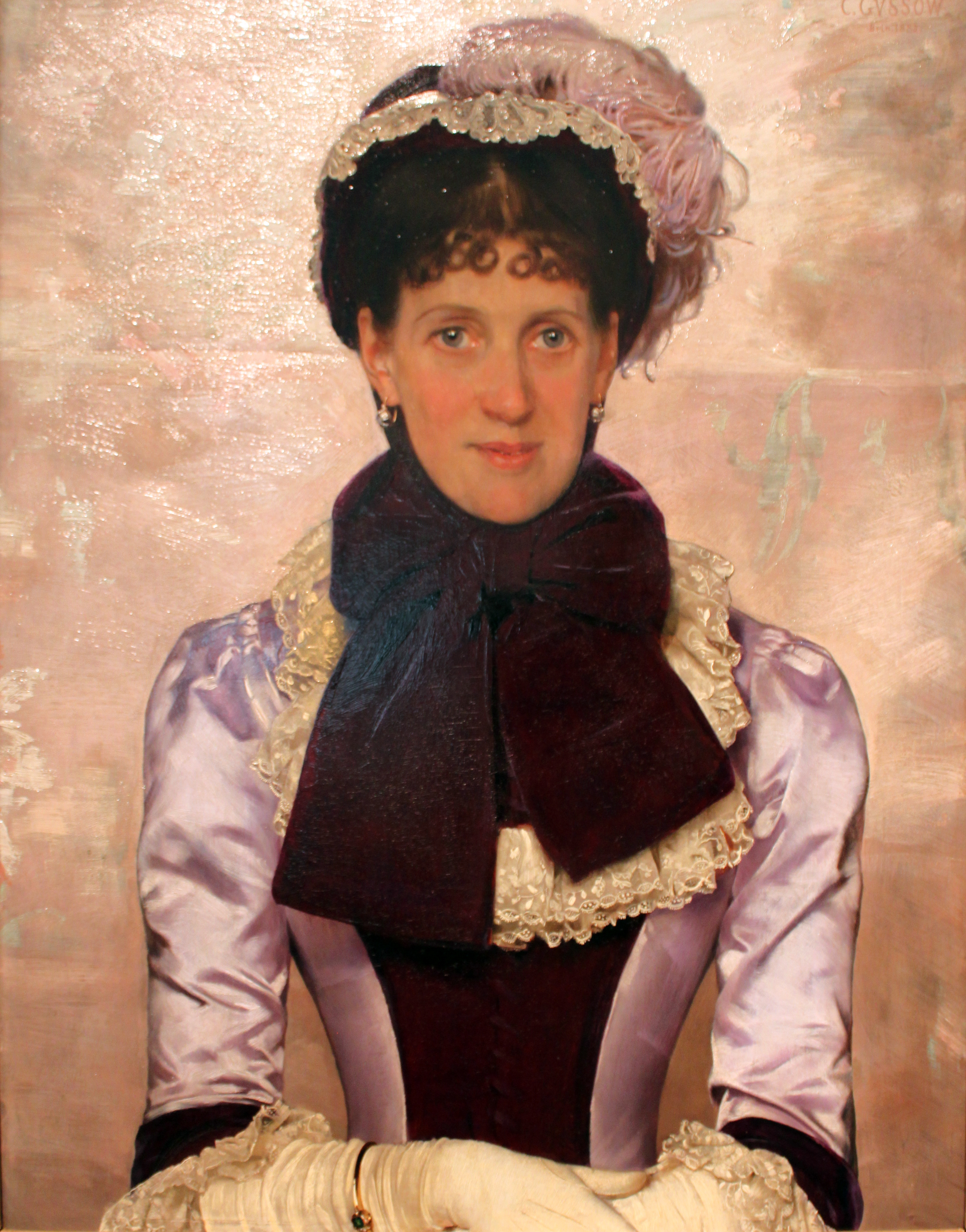
Portrait of a Woman, 1883

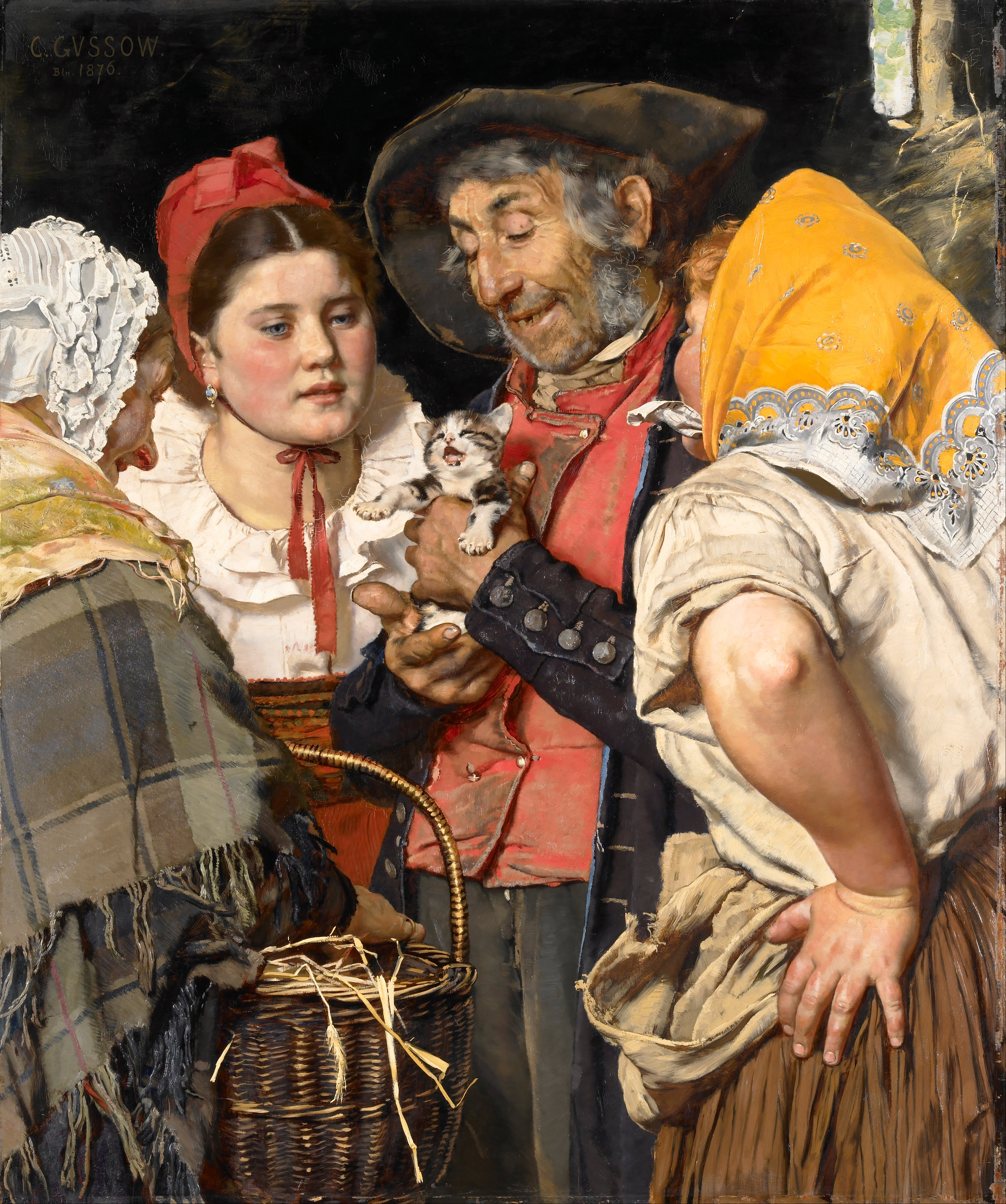
The Old Man's Treasure, 1876

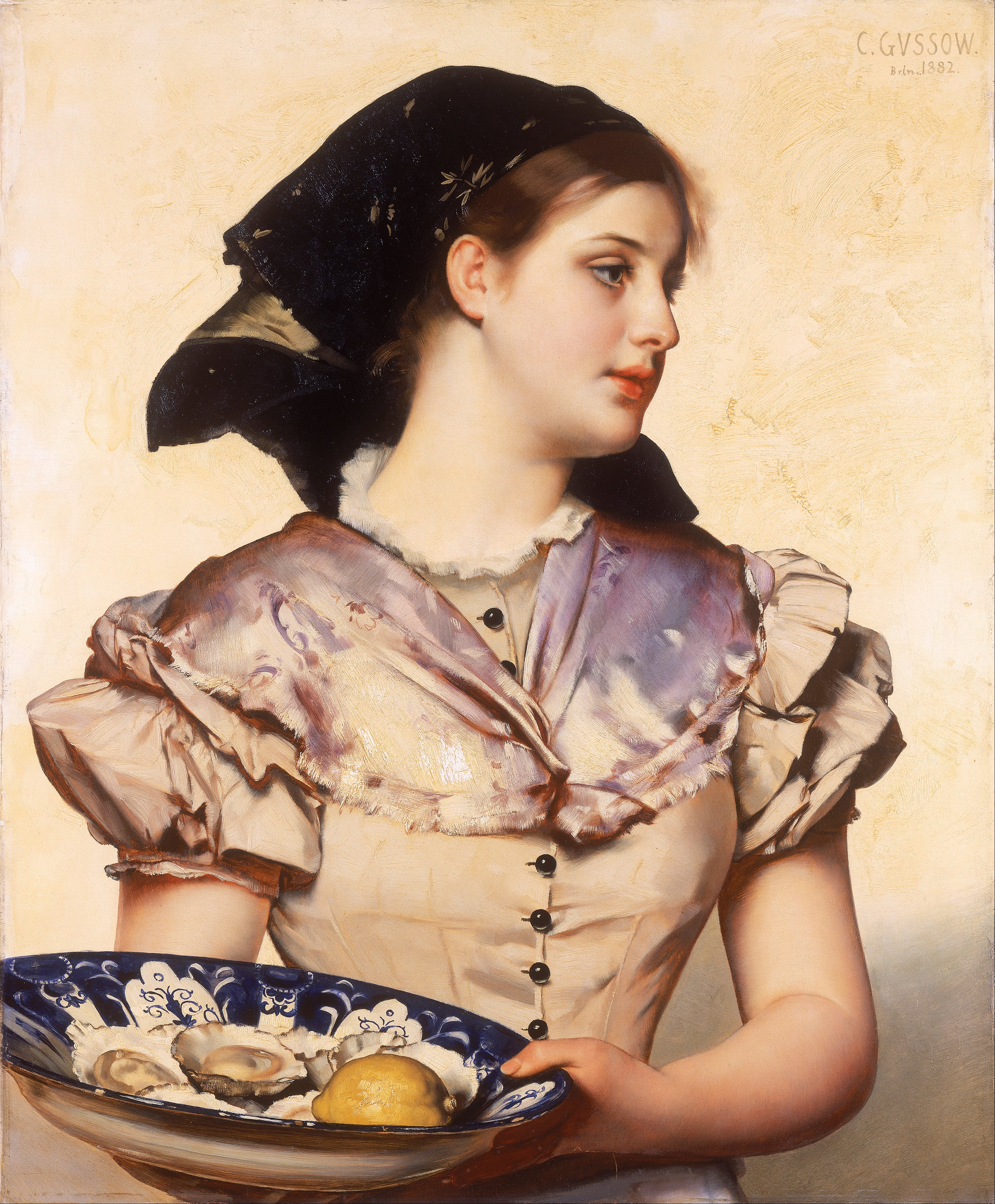
The Oyster Girl, 1882

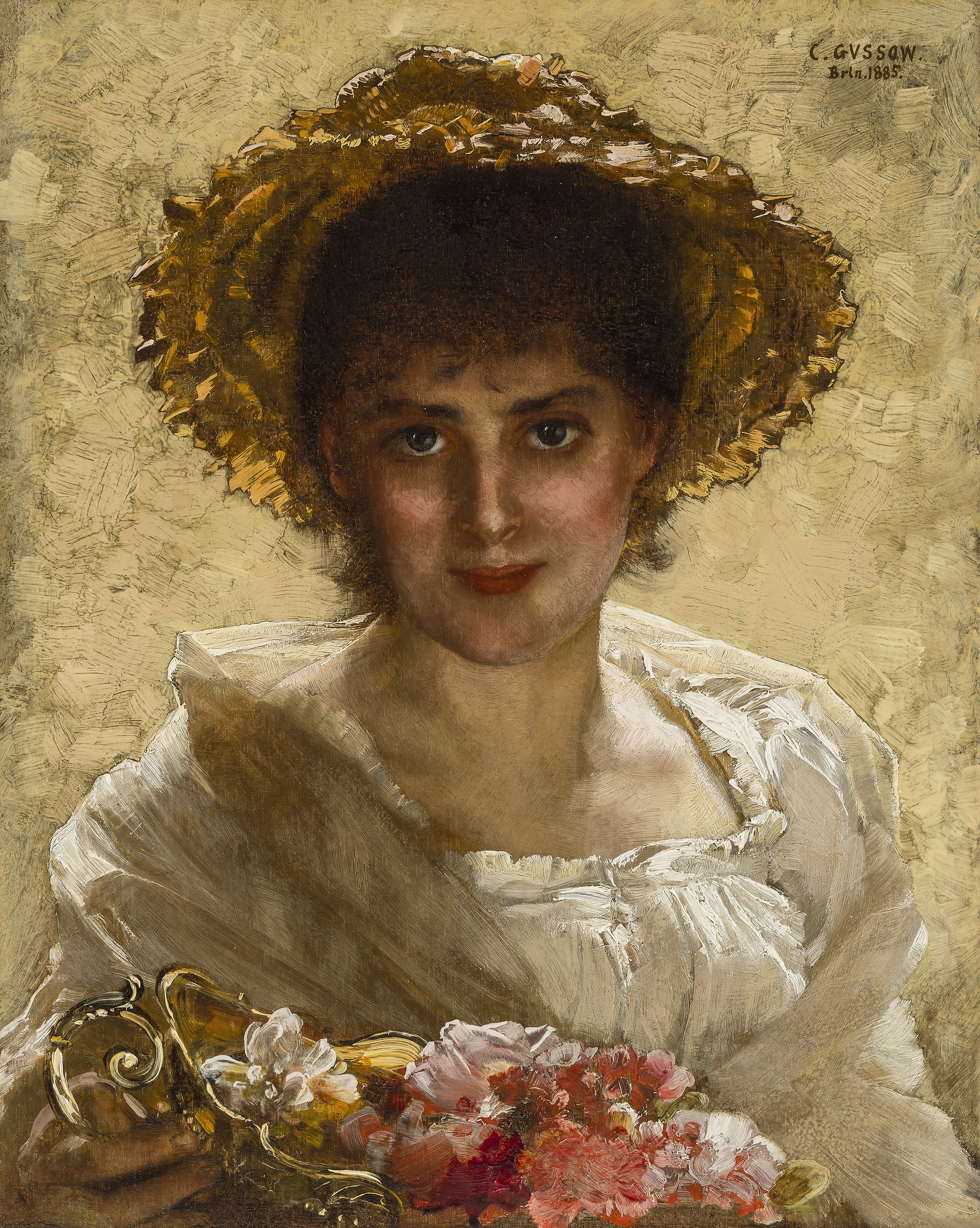
Flora, 1885

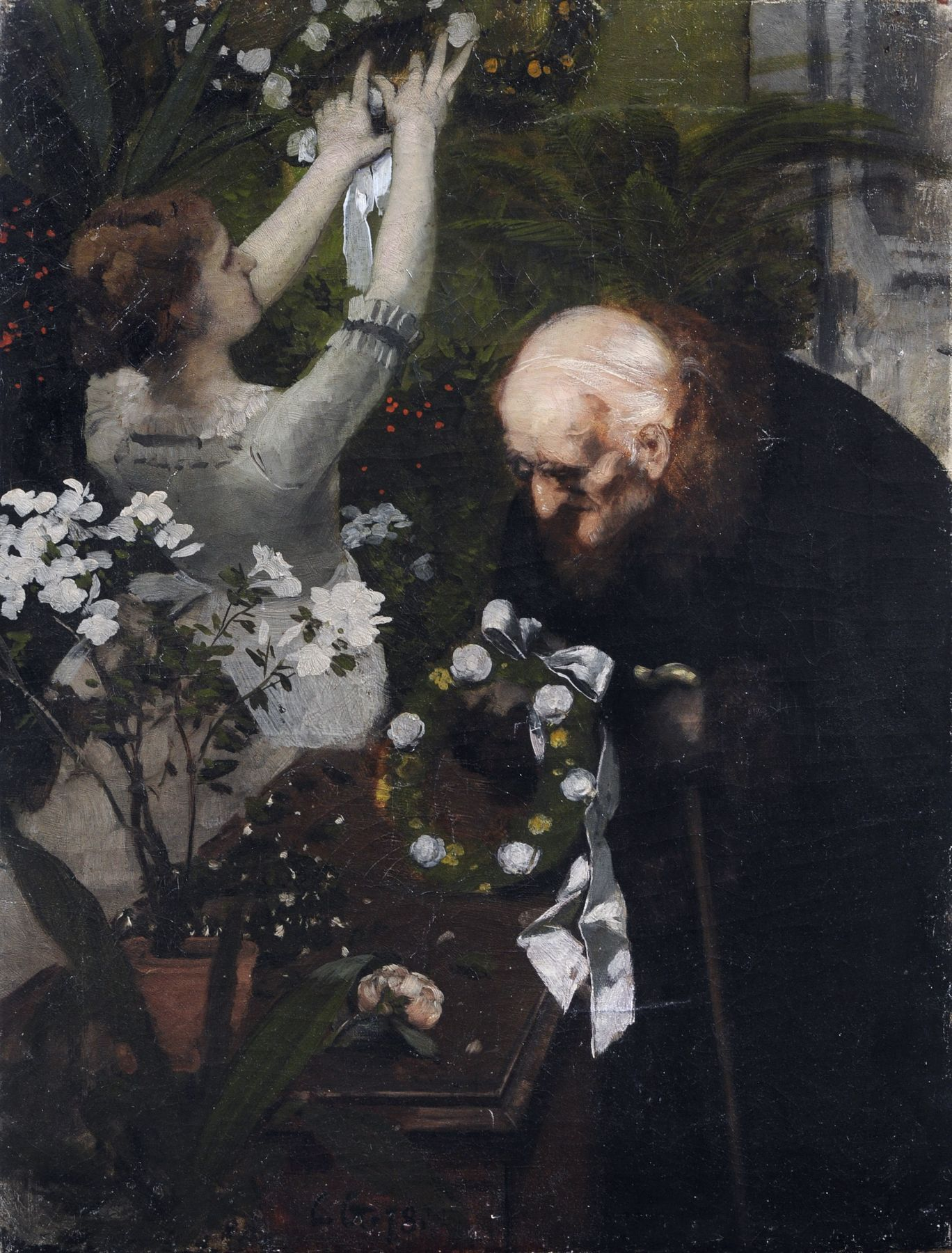
Old Gentleman in the Flower Shop, 1878

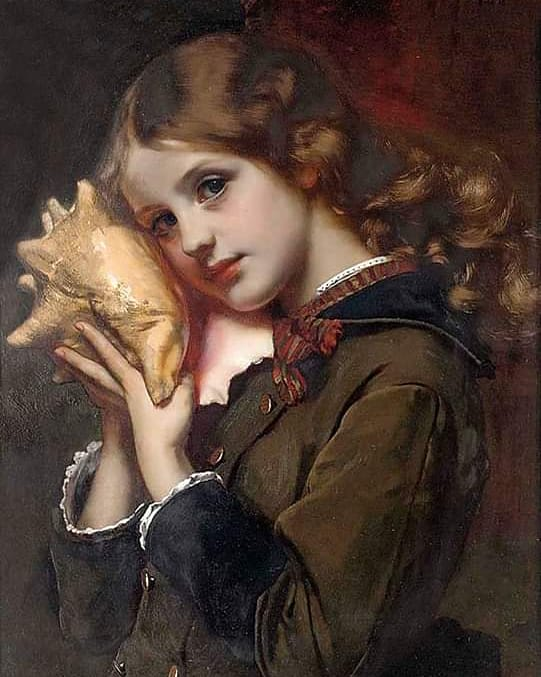
Listening to the Sea, 1879
