= Abbey of the Holy Cross, Rostock =

Abbey in Rostock, Germany

Coordinates: 54°5′14″N 12°7′57″E

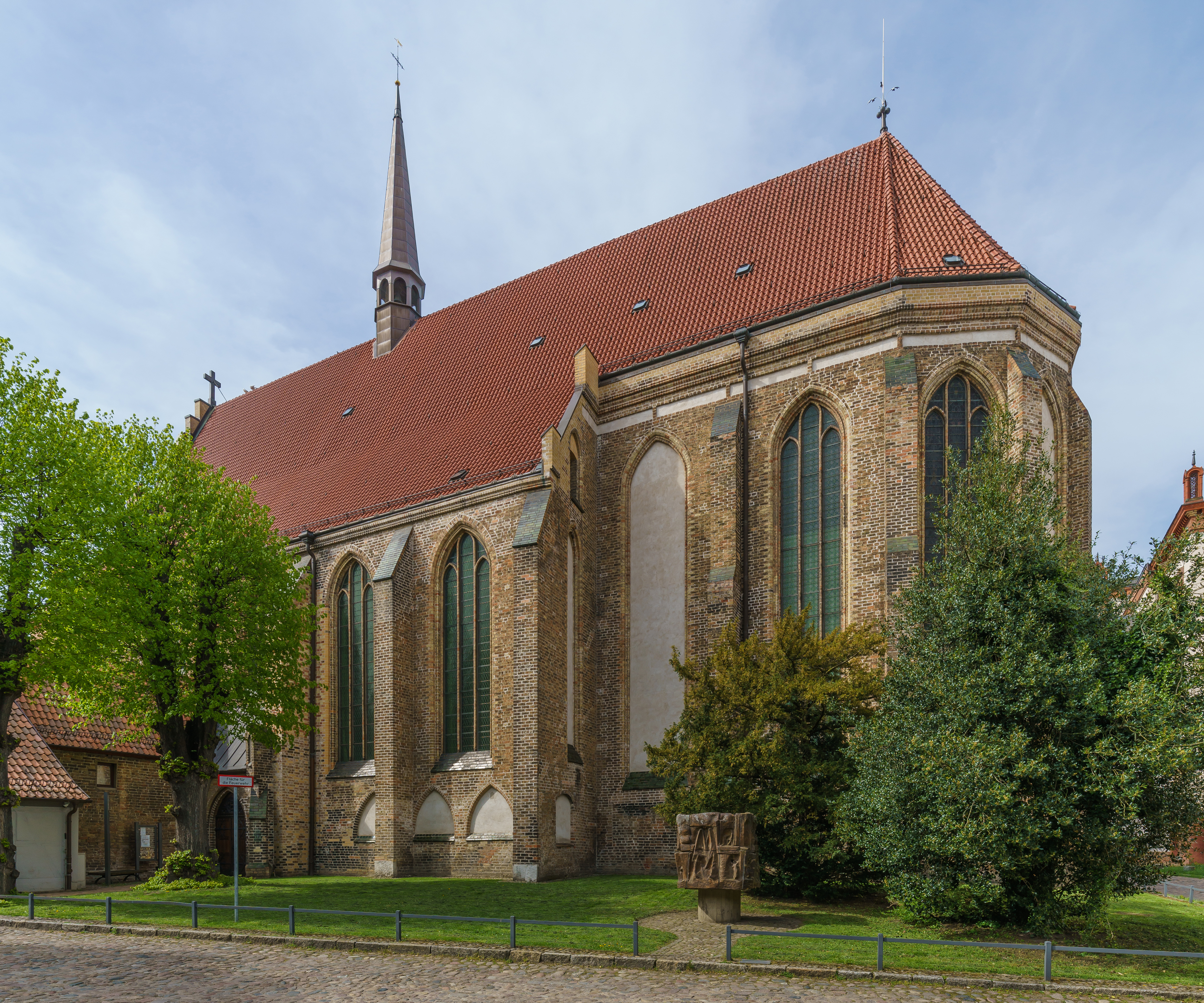
Abbey of the Holy Cross

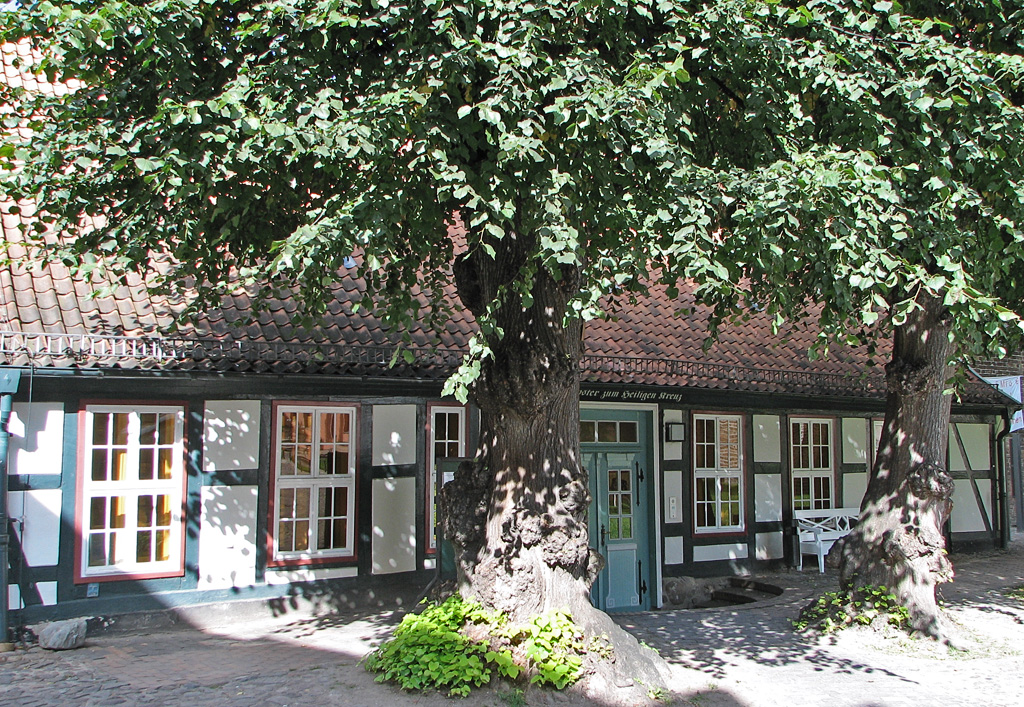
Cultural History Museum of Rostock

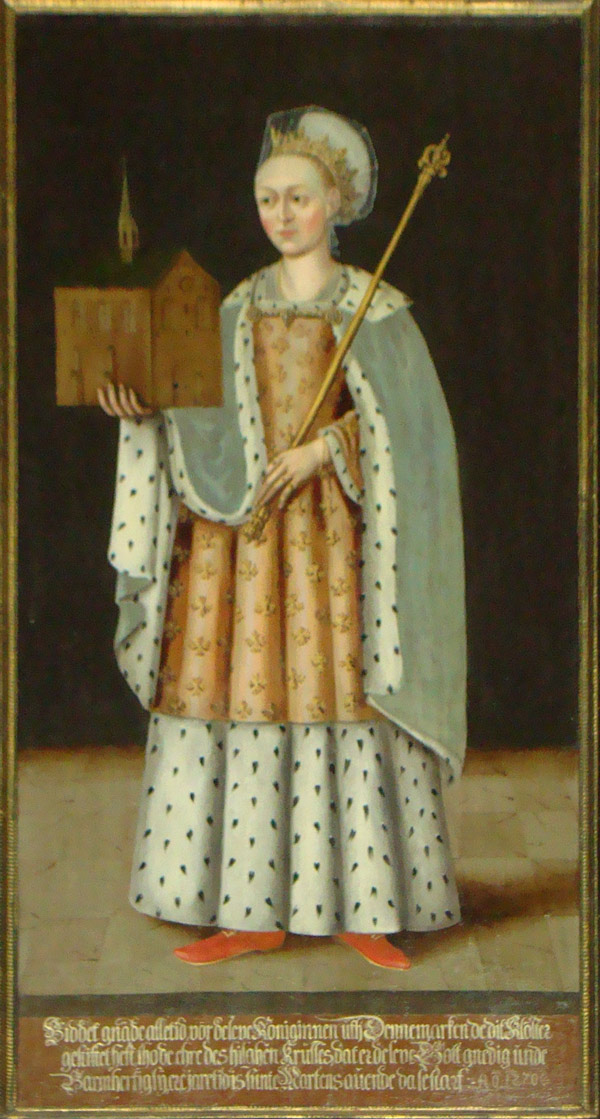
Painting of Queen Margaret Sambiria

The Abbey of the Holy Cross (German: Kloster zum Heiligen Kreuz) in Rostock, Germany, was founded in the 13th century by Cistercian nuns. It is the only fully preserved abbey in the city. The complex includes the former abbey church which is used today as the University Church (Universitätskirche). The remaining former convent buildings house the Museum of Cultural History (Kulturhistorische Museum) for the city of Rostock.

== History ==
The nunnery was founded by the Danish Queen Margaret Sambiria in 1270. According to legend, she founded the abbey in gratitude for a miraculous rescue at sea. She made large donations to the abbey. She died in 1282 and was buried at Doberan Abbey in Bad Doberan which belonged to the Cistercian Order. The abbey gained extensive estates in Rostock and also in the whole of Mecklenburg as a result of donations, endowments and bequests. The nuns came mostly from wealthy families in Rostock. The nunnery was very popular and even had to place restrictions on entry in the 14th century. The abbey church was completed in 1360.

The Reformation was accepted into the abbey in 1562 after just thirty years of "contemplation time" by the nuns in the convent. As a result of the Second Rostock Inheritance Agreement between the city of Rostock and the dukes of Mecklenburg in 1584 the nunnery was turned into a Lutheran damsels' convent (German: Frauenstift). The lives of its conventuals, however, hardly changed at all. The place still resembled a Roman Catholic monastic order. After the Thirty Years' War, however, there were only nine conventuals. In the 19th century, efforts were made to transfer the estate of the nunnery to the state. But it was not until 1920, when the Free State of Mecklenburg-Schwerin constitution was introduced, that the state appropriated all such parastatal entities, such as women's convents. As a result, Mecklenburg-Schwerin's Lutheran church was only allowed to continue legally as an organisation independent of the state. The effect of this was that the nunnery was expropriated by the state without any compensation to the church. On 17 August 1920, the abbey was dissolved, although the remaining conventuals were allowed the right to live there for life. The last abbess died in 1981. The abbey church was renovated both outside and, later, inside from 1997 to 2002. The former convent buildings now house the Cultural History Museum of Rostock.

== Literature ==
- Wolfgang Eric Wagner: Die Grabplatten des Klosters „Zum Heiligen Kreuz“ in Rostock. Redieck & Schade, Rostock 2007; ISBN 978-3-934116-61-0.
- Thomas Hill: Das Kloster zum Heiligen Kreuz, Margrethe Sambria und Rostocks Beziehungen zu Dänemark im 13. Jahrhundert, in: Ortwin Pelc: 777 Jahre Rostock. Neue Beiträge zur Stadtgeschichte, Rostock 1995, pp. 21–30.
- Sabine Pettke: Das Rostocker Kloster zum Heiligen Kreuz vom 16. bis zum 20. Jahrhundert : kirchen- und staatsrechtliche Auseinandersetzungen im Rahmen der mecklenburgischen Kloster- und Verfassungsfrage (Mitteldeutsche Forschungen, Vol. 106) Böhlau, Cologne. 1991.
