= Rostock Inheritance Agreement =

Several agreements between Rostock and Mecklenburg

The Rostock Inheritance Agreement (German: Rostocker Erbvertrag) describes several agreements reached by the Hanseatic city of Rostock with the dukes of Mecklenburg as landlords.

- The first Rostock Inheritance Agreement was reached in 1573 between the city of Rostock and John Albert I of Mecklenburg. Through the agreement the city recognised the duke's sovereignty.
- The Rostock Inheritance Agreement of 1788 was agreed with Duke Frederick Francis I, ending a forty-year power struggle. It set aside renewed disagreements between the parties that had arisen under his predecessor, Duke Frederick of Mecklenburg and awarded special rights to the city until 1918.

The inheritance agreements should not be confused with the State Constitutional Heritable Settlement (Landesgrundgesetzlicher Erbvergleich; LGGEV) of 1755, which Duke Christian Louis agreed with the duchy's estates (Landstände) combining the knights' federation (Ritterschaft) and the chartered cities eligible for the estates (Seestädte and Landstädte forming together the Landschaft), which also included the city of Rostock. This led to a permanent involvement of the estates in the government of the state and from then on blocked constitutional development in the modern sense. The strength of the estates, opposing dynastic divisions, kept Mecklenburg together, at times partitioned into several branch duchies with each its own government but one common body of the estates. And the power of the estates held down the dominance of the monarchs and successfully blocked absolutism in Mecklenburg.
