= Eugen Bracht =

German painter (1842–1921)

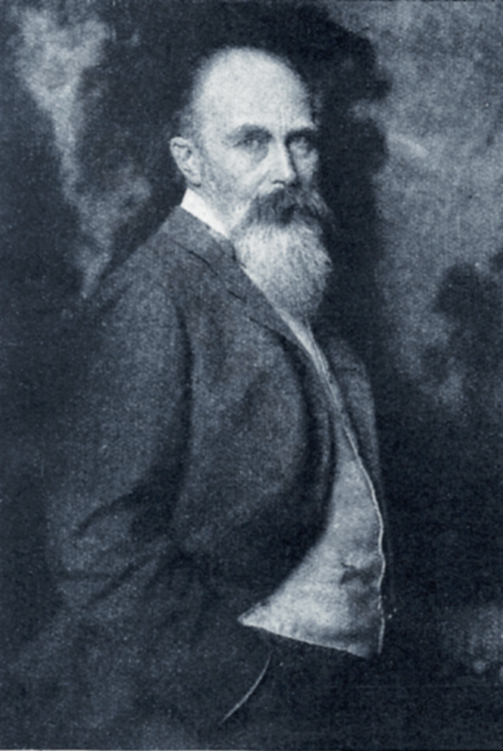
- Bracht – photo by Nicola Perscheid (1917)
- Born: 3 June 1842; Morges, Waadt, Switzerland
- Died: 15 November 1921 (aged 79); Darmstadt, Hesse, Germany
- Resting place: Darmstadt, Hesse, Germany
- Known for: Painting
- Movement: Romanticism, Symbolism, Impressionism

Eugen Felix Prosper Bracht (German pronunciation: [ˈɔʏɡeːn ˈfeːlɪks ˈpʁɔspɐ ˈbʁaxt, ˈɔʏɡn̩ -]; 3 June 1842 – 15 November 1921) was a German landscape painter.

== Biography ==
Bracht was born in Morges, Waadt (near Lake Geneva in Switzerland) of German parents. His family later moved to Darmstadt, Germany, where he became a pupil of Karl Ludwig Seeger at the Academy of Fine Arts, Karlsruhe and later studied under Hans Gude in Düsseldorf. Dissatisfied with his work, he moved to Berlin in 1864 and became a merchant, but in 1876 he renewed his interest in painting and joined his former teacher Seeger in Karlsruhe.

A late Romanticist painter, Bracht was known for his moody landscapes and coastal scenes in North Germany, and began a sketching trip through Syria, Palestine and Egypt from 1880 to 1881. In 1882, he became a professor of Landscape Painting at the Prussian Academy of Arts.

In 1885, he painted the Battle of Chattanooga for the "Philadelphia Panorama Company", a cyclorama which was installed in Philadelphia and Kansas City.

Bracht was supported by Anton von Werner, the conservative director of the Berlin Academy, but cut ties with him during the affair of the closure of Edvard Munch's Berlin exhibition in 1892.

Despite the hostility, when von Werner died, Bracht finished the late painter's panorama of the Battle of Sedan.

Later, Bracht became a representative of German Impressionism.

In 1901, he obtained a teaching position at the Dresden Academy of Fine Arts that he held until 1919. He retired to Darmstadt, where he died in 1921.

== Selected paintings ==
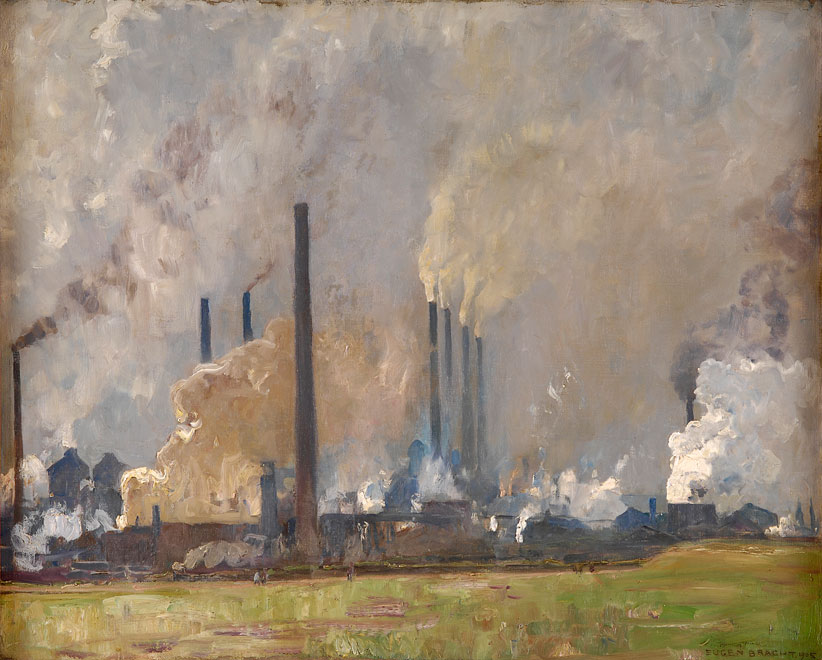
Hoesch Steelworks (1905)

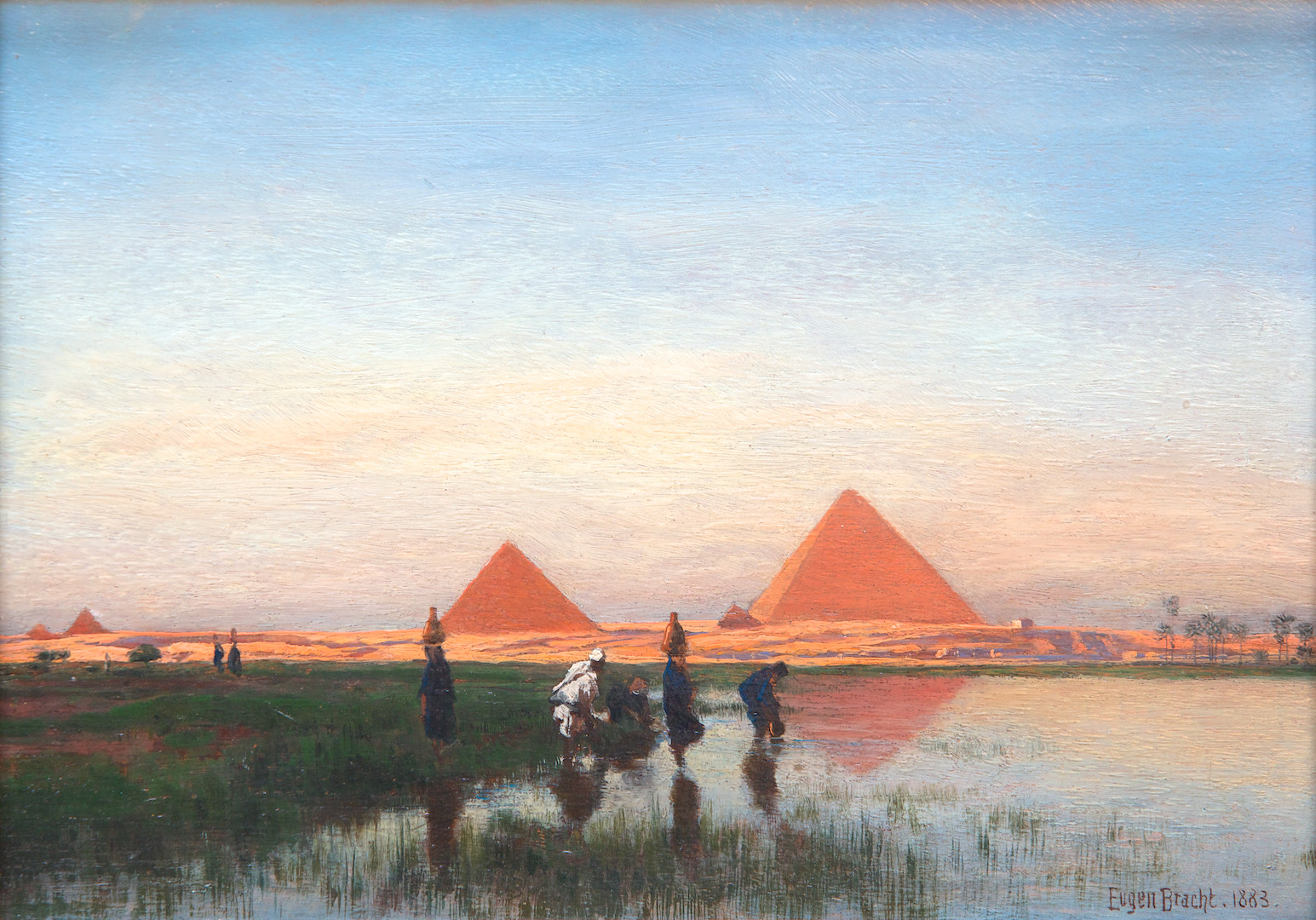
Memories of Giza (1883)

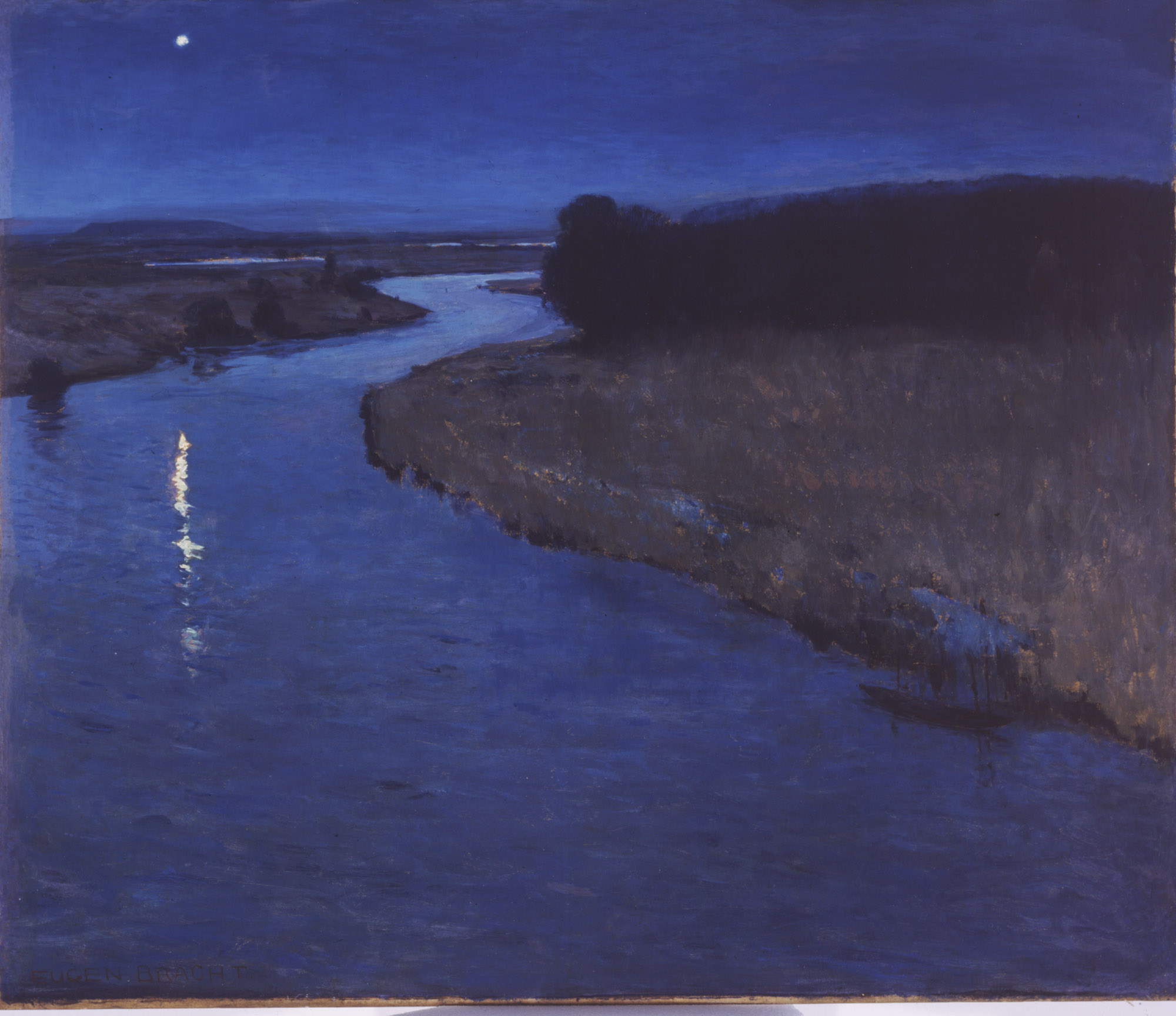
Morning Star (1889)

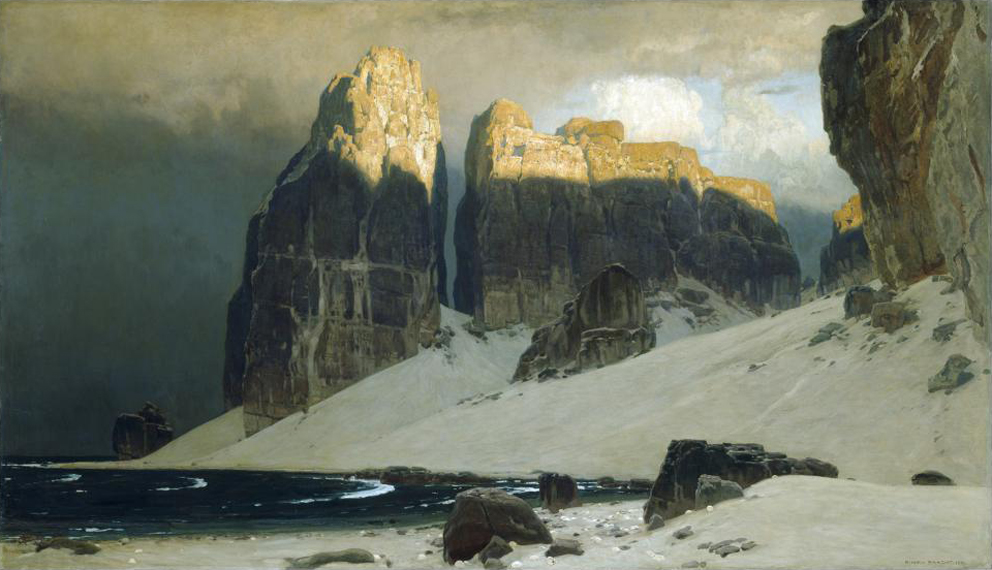
The Shore of Oblivion (1911)

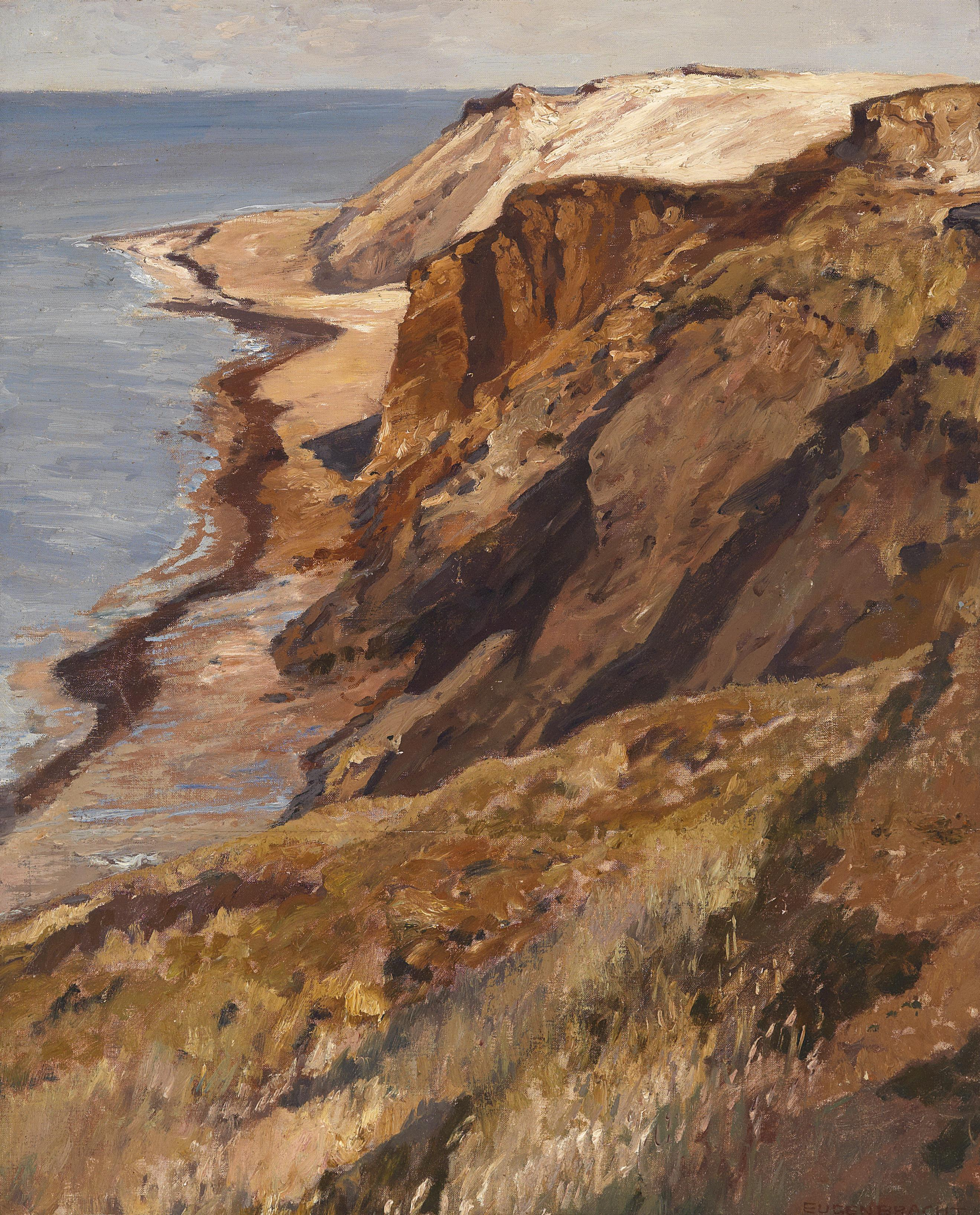
Coast of Sylt (Morsum-Kliff) (1897)

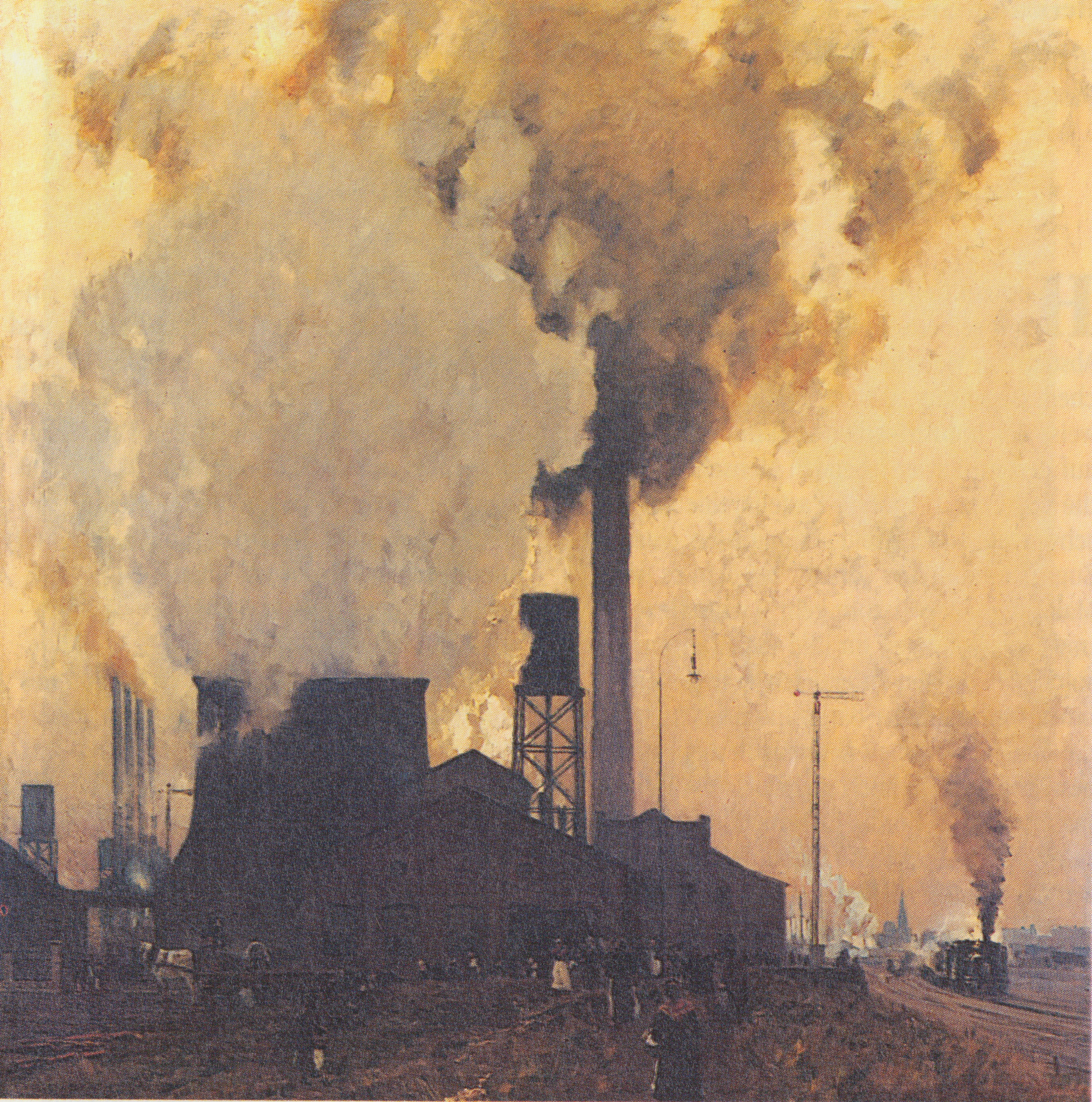
Hoesch Steelwoorks (1907)

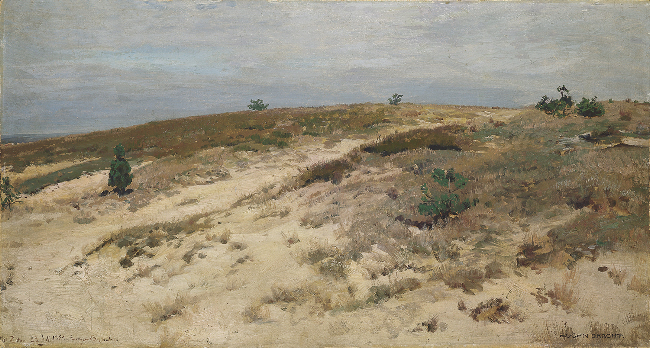
Neu Zittau (1884)

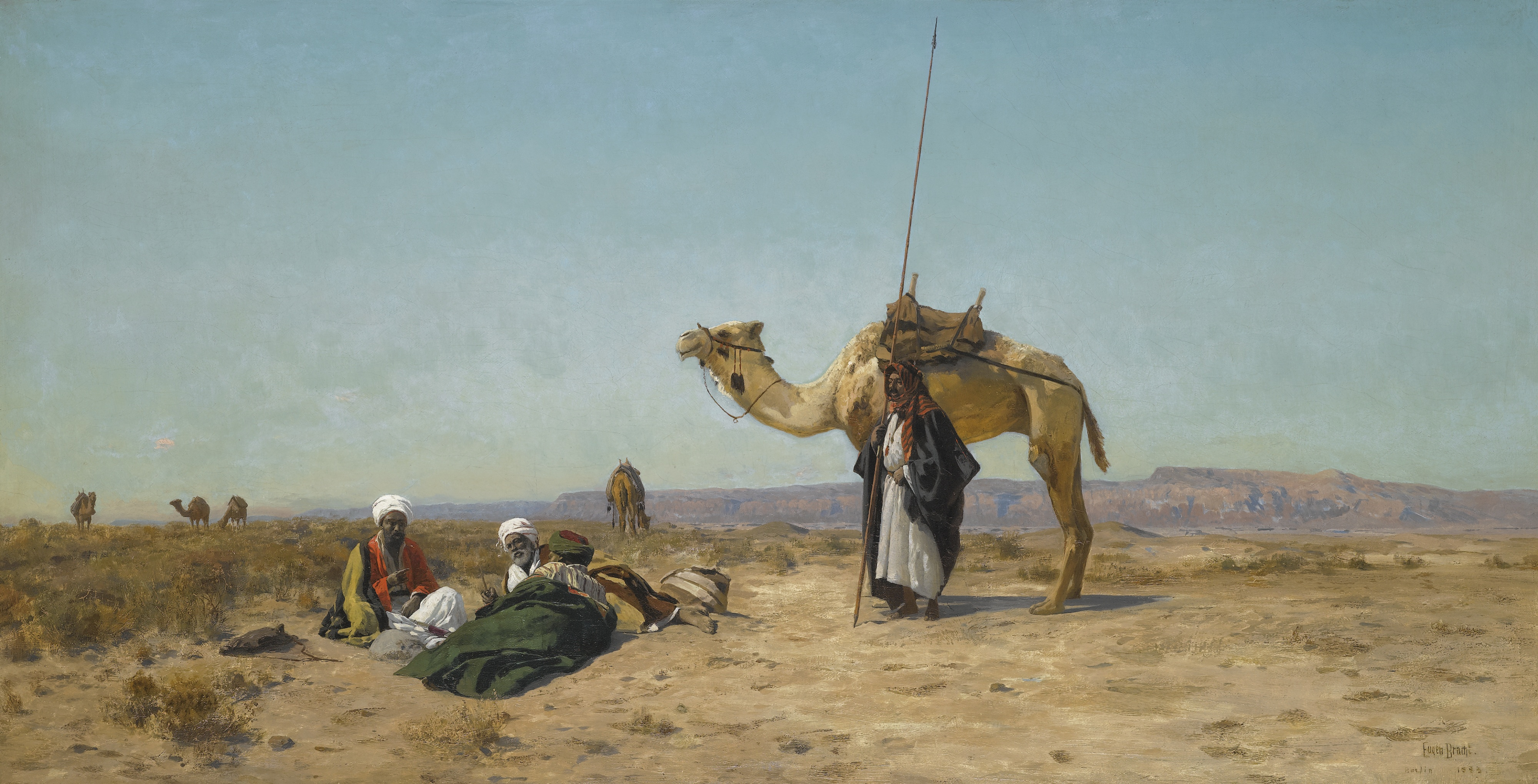
Rest in the Syrian Desert (1883)

== See also ==
- List of Orientalist artists
- Orientalism
