= Anna Gerresheim =

German painter (1852–1921)

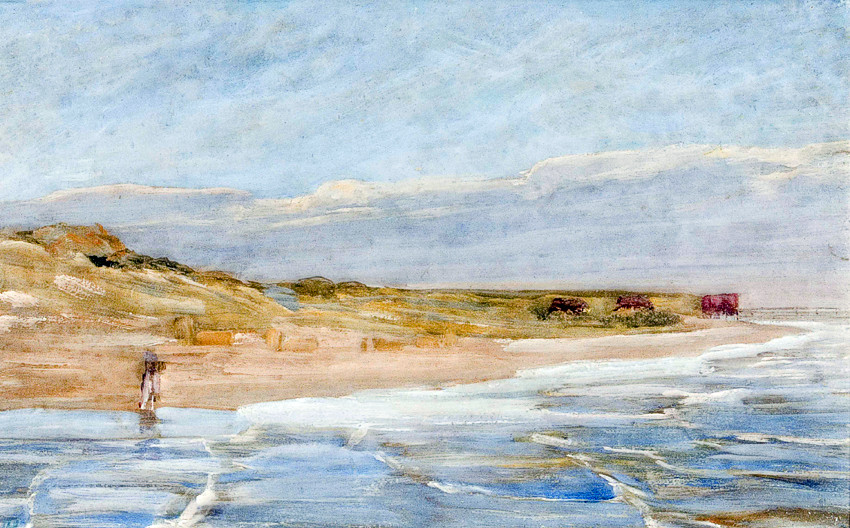
- Küste im Morgenlicht (1910) (Coast in the morning light)
- Born: 8 March 1852; Ribnitz, Mecklenburg, Germany
- Died: 1 December 1921 (aged 69); Ahrenshoop, Pomerania, Germany
- Occupations: landscape artist, portrait painter and etcher

Anna Louise Adolphine Eduardine Gerresheim (8 March 1852 – 1 December 1921) was a German landscape artist, portrait painter and etcher. She was among the founders of the artist's colony in Ahrenshoop on the Baltic Sea.

== Life ==
Anna Gerresheim was born in 1852. She was the third of the eight children born to Eduard Adolph Gerresheim, a member of the Ribnitz city council, and his wife Dorothea Henriette. Although women were not permitted in art academies at that time, her parents allowed her, in 1874, to visit the art school of August tom Dieck (1831–1893) in Dresden. After the death of the father in 1876, Gerresheim spent four years in Berlin at the Prussian Academy of Arts, studying in the "ladies class" of Karl Gussow. In 1880, Gerresheim visited the artists' colony in the Danish Hornbæk. In 1882 she spent three months in London and Wales, where she fulfilled several portrait commissions. In 1883 Gerresheim spent three months in Paris on a study visit with Emile Auguste Carolus-Duran and Jean-Jacques Henner. In 1884 Gerresheim became a member of the Berlin Association of Women Artists. In 1885 she visited Ahrenshoop for the first time and in 1892, with her sister Bertha (1846–1916), she built a house in the village there. They were joined in 1906 by her sister Auguste (1838–1908), who, like Bertha, was also a painter. None of the three sisters were married and neither Bertha nor Auguste Gerresheim reached the renown of their younger sister.

Anna Gerresheim died in their home in Ahrenshoop and was buried at the "Schifferfriedhof" (skipper-graveyard) in the village.

== Work ==
Gerresheim created mainly portraits and genre paintings during her years at the Berlin academy. She painted many landscape studies of the Baltic Sea after 1880, influenced by her stay in Hornbæk and the impact that the fisherman paintings of Peder Severin Krøyer and the seascapes of Kristian Zahrtmann had on her. In 1881 one of her paintings was shown at the Academic Art Exhibition in Berlin. She participated from 1884 in the exhibitions of the Berlin Association of Women Artists and later was also a member of the Munich club for original etching. Gerresheim made primarily works with motifs of the Baltic coast during her time in Ahrenshoop. She was still active there after 1918 when many artists left the village.

== Works (selection) ==
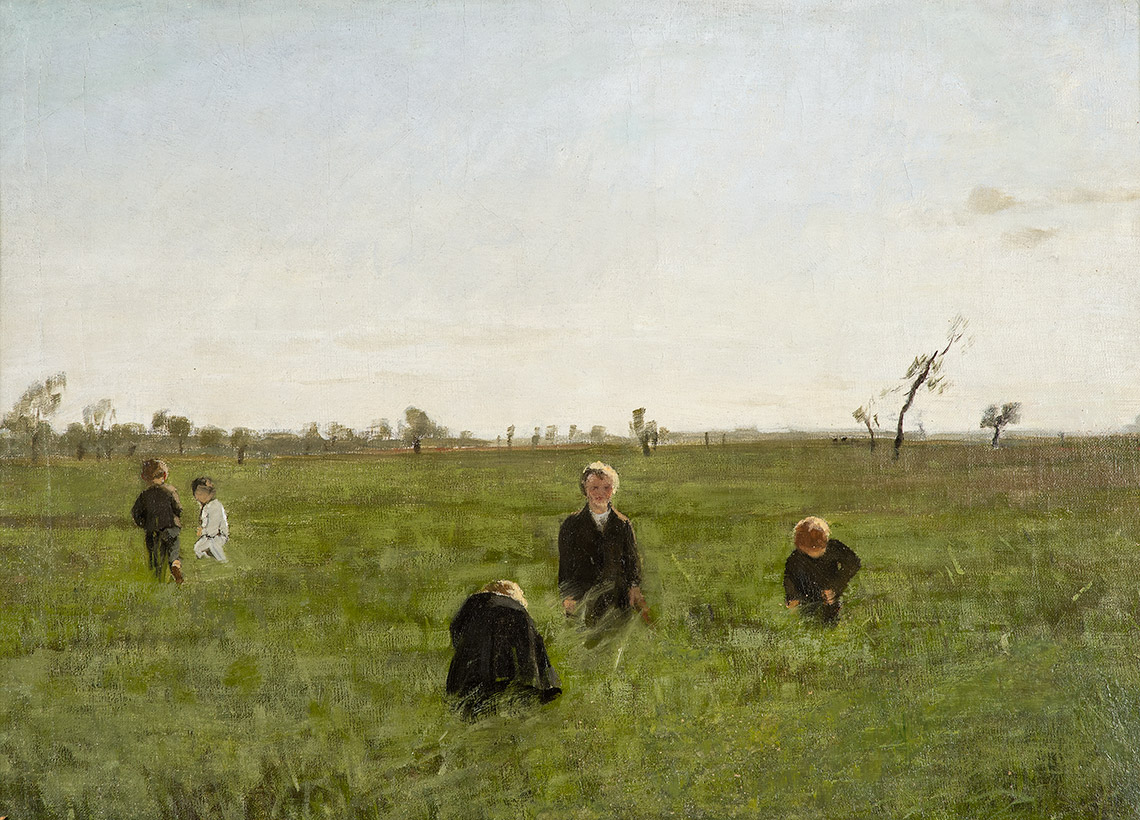
Spielende Kinder in einer Boddenwiese, um 1895 (Children playing on a lagoon meadow)

- Buchenwald (Beech wood) (1885)
- Weiden am Abendhimmel (Willow Trees in the Evening Sky) (1890)
- Fischerkaten am Bodden (Fishing huts at the Lagoon) (1895)
- Jakob sieht im Traum die Himmelsleiter (Jacob in a dream sees the ladder to heaven) (1895)
- Spielende Kinder in einer Boddenwiese (Children playing on a lagoon meadow) (1895), Art Museum Ahrenshoop (Kunstmuseum)
- Darßer Wald (Darss Forest) (1905)
- Selbstbildnis (Self-portrait) (1905)
- Weidelandschaft (Pasture)
- Bauerngehöft (Farmstead); all in the Museum of Cultural History of Rostock (Kulturhistorisches Museum)
- Hamburger Stimmungen (Hamburg Moods) (1884) – 11 Etchings
- Berliner Blätter (Berlin Sheets) (1885–1890) – 6 Etchings

== Exhibitions ==
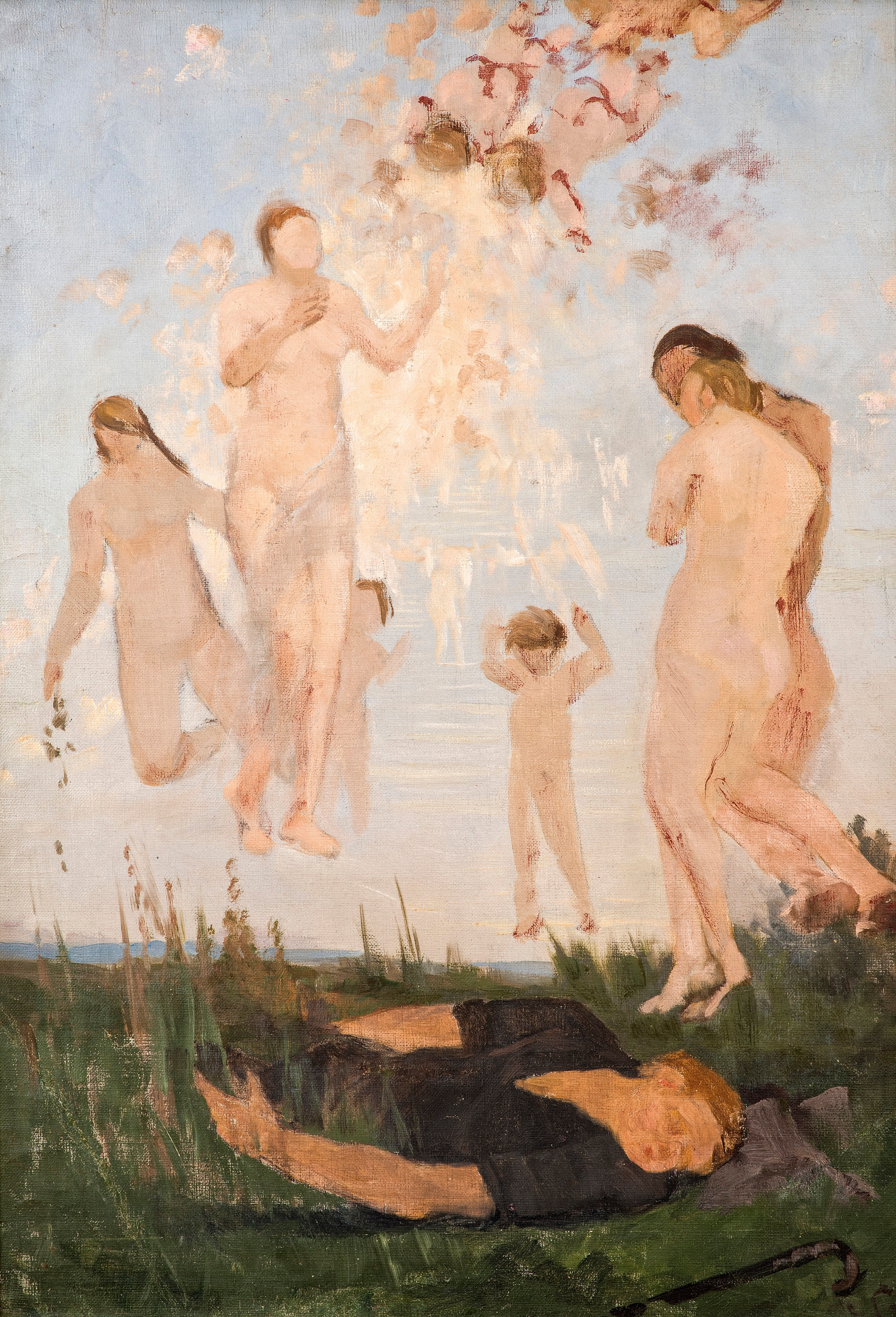
Jakob sieht im Traum die Himmelsleiter (Jacob in a dream sees the ladder to heaven)

- Until 1914: several times at the exhibitions of the Royal Academy of Arts in Berlin, the Great Berlin Art Exhibition. and in the Munich Glass Palace.
  - 1881: Aus dem Thiergarten bei Berlin (From the Tierpark Berlin) (1881)
  - 1888: Haidelandschaft (Heath landscape) (1888)
  - 1889: Märkische Landkirche in Parlow (March Country Church) (1889)
  - 1893: Eine Wildniss (A Wilderness) (1893)
  - 1897: März (March) (Tempera) (1897)[1]
- Exhibition of the Berlin Association of Women Artists:
  - 1884: Gänsehüterin in Mecklenburg (Geese keeper in Mecklenburg) and Kartoffelaufnehmer (Potato Picker)
  - 1894: Oktoberwald (October Forest) (Tempera), Spillbaumgruppe
- 1911: Mecklenburg Arts Exhibition in Schwerin: Winter in Ahrenshoop
- 1928: Memorial Exhibition in the "Great Berlin Art Exhibition"
- 2002: Dünenhaus Ahrenshoop and Singer–Museum Laren Netherlands
- 2003/2004: Anna Gerresheim – das Grafische Werk – von der Griffelkunst zum Erlebnis der Farbe, Museum of Cultural History, Rostock and Kunstkaten Ahrenshoop (the graphic work - from the stylus art to experience of color)

== See also ==
- List of German women artists
