= Prussian Academy of Arts =

Former art school in Berlin, Germany

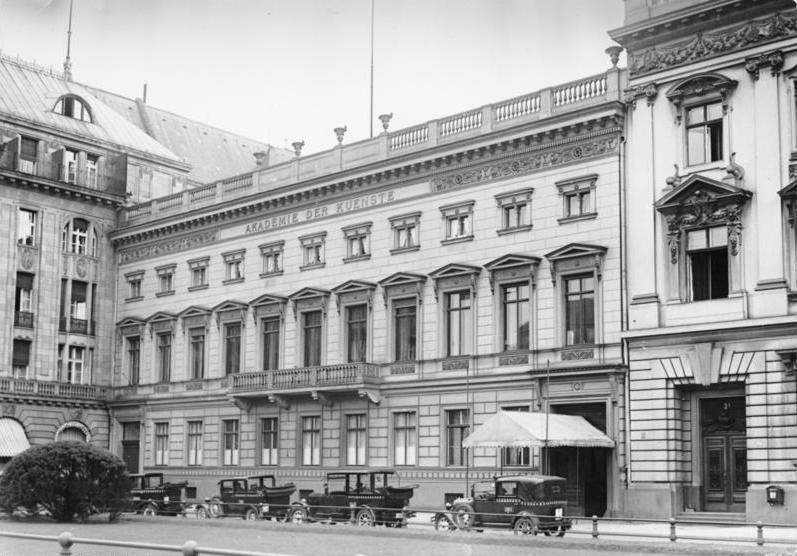
Arnim Palace, the Prussian Academy of Arts building on Pariser Platz in Berlin, c. 1903

The Prussian Academy of Arts (German: Preußische Akademie der Künste) was a state arts academy first established in 1694 by prince-elector Frederick III of Brandenburg in Berlin, in personal union Duke Frederick I of Prussia, and later king in Prussia.

After the Accademia dei Lincei in Rome and the Académies Royales in Paris, the Prussian Academy of Art was the oldest institution of its kind in Europe, with a similar mission to other royal academies of that time, such as the Real Academia Española in Madrid, the Royal Society in London, or the Royal Swedish Academy of Fine Arts in Stockholm.

The academy had a decisive influence on art and its development in the German-speaking world throughout its existence. For an extended period of time it was also the German artists' society and training organisation, whilst the Academy's Senate became Prussia's arts council as early as 1699.

It dropped 'Prussian' from its name in 1945 and was finally disbanded in 1955 after the 1954 foundation of two separate academies of art for East Berlin and West Berlin in 1954. Those two separate academies merged in 1993 to form Berlin's present-day Academy of Arts.

== People ==
Most artists were associated with the academy as members. Membership was an honorary distinction extended to prominent domestic Prussian artists (after unification, German artists) and selected foreign figures as well. A 'deliberative' body of senators was chosen from the membership – some elected, and some automatically included due to other rank.

The academy was not a school, although it had associations with educational institutions, notably the state school that evolved into the present-day Berlin University of the Arts.

=== Directors ===
- Joseph Werner (1695–1699)
- Samuel Theodor Gericke (1705–1712)
- Friedrich Wilhelm Weidemann (1718–1732 [1750?])
- Antoine Pesne (1732–1757)
- Blaise Nicholas Le Sueur (1757–1785)
- Bernhard Rode (1785–1797)
- Daniel Chodowiecki (1797–1801)
- Johann Gottfried Schadow (1815–1850)
- Anton von Werner (1875–1915)
- Franz Heinrich Schwechten (1915–1918)
- Max Liebermann (1920–1932)
- Max von Schillings (1932–1933)

== History ==
=== 1694 to 1799 ===
The academy was founded to include painters, sculptors, and architects as members, which reflected the classical unity of the arts ideal. The scope was expanded in 1704 to include "Mechanical Sciences". The academy's first director (president) was Swiss painter Joseph Werner. In 1796, the Academy announced a competition for a monument in honour of Frederick the Great. Friedrich Gilly designed a monumental temple in the style of revolutionary architecture (Revolutionsarchitektur) to be erected on Leipziger Platz in Berlin. Today, the design is part of the collection of the Kupferstichkabinett Berlin.

Name changes:

- 1696–1704 Kurfürstliche Academie der Mahler-, Bildhauer- und Architectur-Kunst (Electoral Academy of the Arts of Painter, Sculptor and Architecture)
- 1704–1790 Königlich-Preussische Akademie der Künste und mechanischen Wissenschaften (Royal Prussian Academy of the Arts and Mechanical Sciences)
- 1790–1809 Königliche Akademie der bildenden Künste und mechanischen Wissenschaften zu Berlin (Royal Academy of Fine Arts and Mechanical Sciences of Berlin)

=== 19th century ===
Longtime director and sculptor Johann Gottfried Schadow served from 1815 to 1850. In 1833 the academy added a fine arts division, and a music division in 1835.

Emil Fuchs studied at the Academy under Fritz Schaper and Anton von Werner, shortly before 1891. Otto Geyer studied there from 1859 to 1864. Sculptor Wilhelm Neumann-Torborg studied at the academy from 1878 until 1885, under Otto Knille and Fritz Schaper. In 1885, he won the Academy's Rome Scholarship for his thesis, "The Judgment of Paris". Anna Gerresheim studied there from 1876 for four years in the "ladies class" under Karl Gussow. Oskar Frenzel studied there between 1884 and 1889 under Paul Friedrich Meyerheim and Eugen Bracht. He was from 1904 until his death a member of the Academy. Painter Friedrich Wachenhusen studied there in 1889 under Eugen Bracht.

Name changes:

- 1790–1809 Königliche Akademie der bildenden Künste und mechanischen Wissenschaften zu Berlin (Royal Academy of Fine Arts and Mechanical Sciences of Berlin)
- 1809–1875 Königlich Preussische Akademie der Künste (Royal Prussian Academy of the Arts)
- 1875–1882 Königlich Preussische Akademie der Künste zu Berlin (Royal Prussian Academy of the Arts of Berlin)
- 1882–1918 Königliche Akademie der Künste zu Berlin (Royal Academy of the Arts of Berlin)

=== 20th century ===
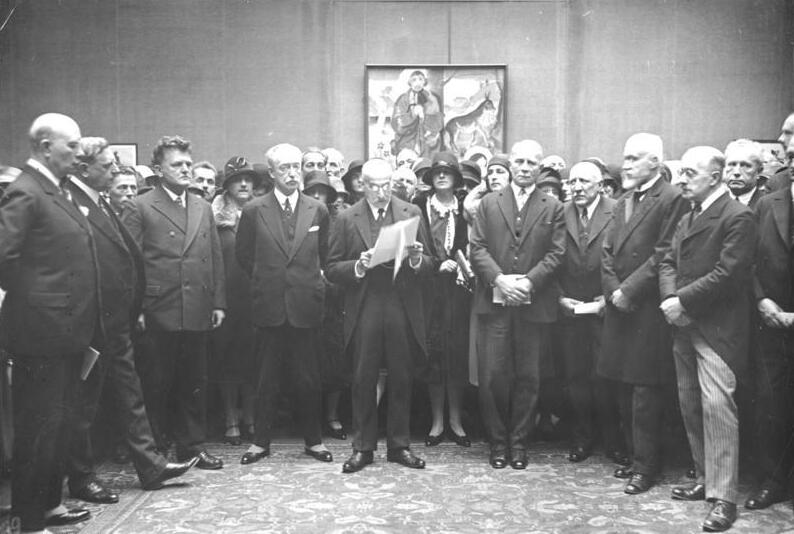
Director Max Liebermann (center) opening a 1922 "Black & White" Exhibition at the Academy

In 1926 the academy added a Dichtkunst (Fine Poetry) division, a Dichtung (Poetry) division in 1932, and the German Academy of Poetry from the beginning of June 1933. From 1930 until his parting into exile in 1933, novelist Heinrich Mann was its president.

Painter and sculptor Paul Wallat studied there from 1902 to 1909 under Otto Brausewetter (de) (1835–1904) and Carl Saltzmann. On 29 December 1906 he received the award of the Ginsberg Foundation of the Berlin Academy. In 1920, Käthe Kollwitz became the first woman elected to the Prussian Academy, but with the coming to power of Adolf Hitler in 1933 she was expelled because of her beliefs and her art.

Name changes:

- 1882–1918 Königliche Akademie der Künste zu Berlin (Royal Academy of the Arts of Berlin)
- 1918–1926 Akademie der Künste zu Berlin (Academy of the Arts of Berlin)
- 1926–1931 Preußische Akademie der Künste zu Berlin (Prussian Academy of the Arts of Berlin)
- 1931–1954 Preussische Akademie der Künste (Prussian Academy of the Arts; disbanded)
