= Hiddensee =

German island in the Baltic Sea

- Municipality
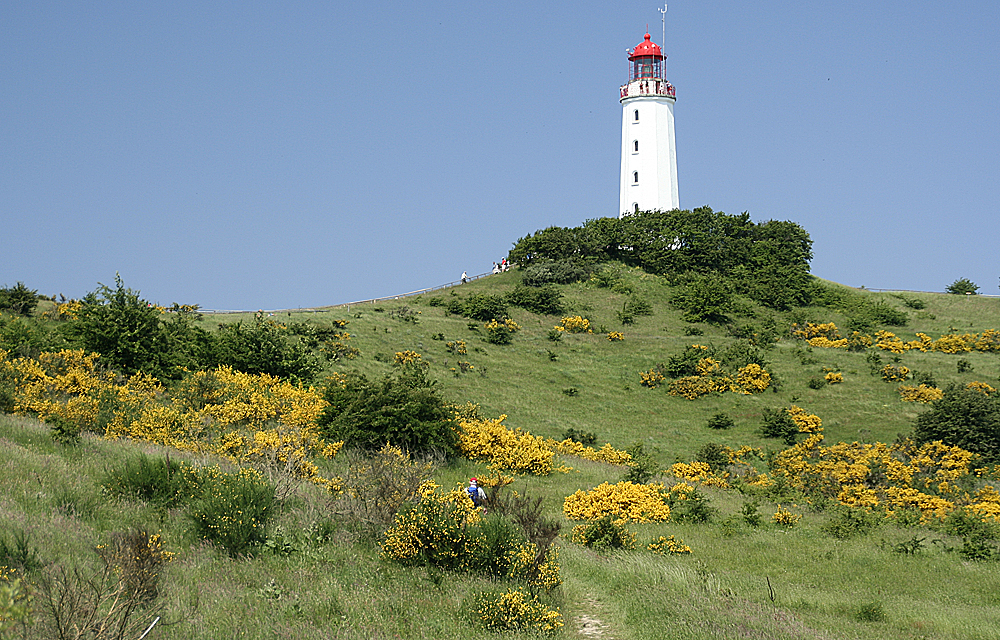
- Dornbusch Lighthouse on Hiddensee Island

- Flag Coat of arms

- Location of Hiddensee within Vorpommern-Rügen district
- Interactive map of Hiddensee
- Location within Germany Location within Mecklenburg-Vorpommern
- Coordinates: 54°32′24″N 13°5′34″E
- Country: Germany
- State: Mecklenburg-Vorpommern
- District: Vorpommern-Rügen
- Municipal assoc.: West-Rügen

Area
  - Total: 19.07 km^{2} (7.36 sq mi)
- Elevation: 0–72 m (0–236 ft)

Population (2025-12-31)
  - Total: 912
  - Density: 47.8/km^{2} (124/sq mi)
- Time zone: UTC+01:00 (CET)
  - Summer (DST): UTC+02:00 (CEST)
- Postal codes: 18565
- Dialling codes: 038300
- Vehicle registration: RÜG
- Website: website

Hiddensee (German pronunciation: [ˈhɪdn̩zeː]) is a mostly car-free island in the Baltic Sea, located west of Germany's largest island, Rügen, on the German coast.

The island has about 1,000 inhabitants. It was a holiday destination for East German tourists during German Democratic Republic (GDR) times, and continues to attract tourists today. It is the location of the University of Greifswald's ornithological station. Gerhart Hauptmann and Walter Felsenstein are buried there.

== Name ==
The name Hedinsey surfaces as early as the Prose Edda and the Gesta Danorum written by Saxo Grammaticus and means "Island of Hedin". The legendary Norwegian king, Hedin, was supposed to have fought here for a woman or even just for gold. Under Danish rule the name Hedins-Oe ("Hedin's Island") was common. Even in 1880 the island was shown in German maps as Hiddensjö and, in 1929, in German holiday guides as Hiddensöe. Its full Germanization to Hiddensee is thus relatively recent.

== Geography ==
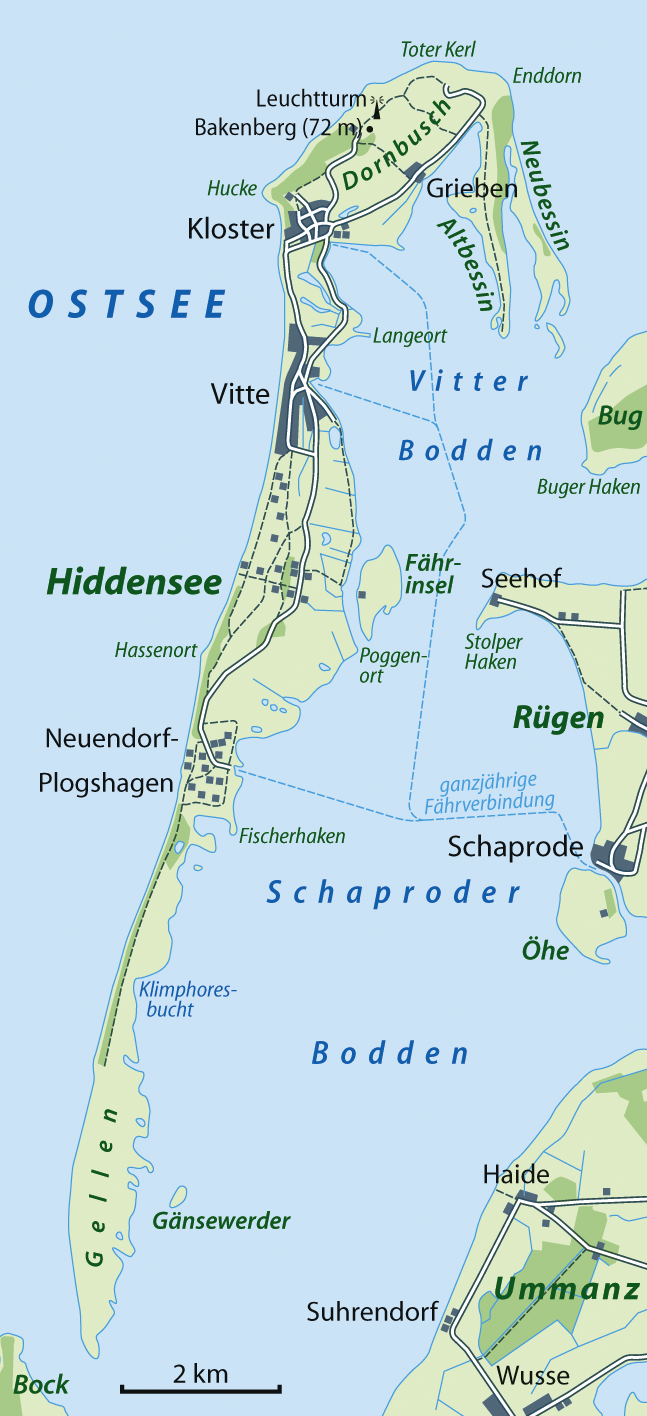
Overview map of Hiddensee

Hiddensee is about 16.8 kilometres (10.4 mi) long, about 250 metres (270 yd) wide at its narrowest point and about 3.7 kilometres (2.3 mi) wide at its broadest point. It is the largest island within the Western Pomerania Lagoon Area National Park and belongs to the district of Vorpommern-Rügen in the state of Mecklenburg-Western Pomerania. It lies west of the island of Rügen and is divided into an undulating, over 70-metre-high (230 ft) northern part (Dornbusch, whose highest point is the Bakenberg at 72 m above sea level (NN)), a dune and heath landscape in the central area (Dünenheide) and a flat, only few-metres-high southern part, the Gellen. In the northeast are the two three-kilometre-long (1.9 mi) spits of Alter Bessin and Neuer Bessin. The island is bounded by the Schaproder Bodden and Vitter Bodden to the east, the Gellenstrom (the shipping channel to Stralsund) to the south and the open Baltic Sea to the west and north.

=== Settlements ===
The following settlements are located on the island: Kloster, Vitte, Neuendorf, Grieben.

==== Grieben ====
Grieben is the northernmost place on the island. Its name is derived from the Slavic word for mushroom. Grieben was one of the two settlements on the island that existed in Slavic times before the arrival of the German monks in the 13th century. In the 14th century, eight cottages are documented for Grieben. The number of houses has hardly changed since then.

==== Kloster ====
The village was established around Kloster Hiddensee, founded at the end of the 13th century. At the end of the 19th century, there was only a church, a manor house, a rectory and schoolhouse, and two workers' houses. Only then did the village gradually grow to its present size. A number of artists, writers or even scientists settled in the village or on its outskirts; Kloster has become known as the place of residence of Gerhart Hauptmann, who was buried in the island cemetery there.

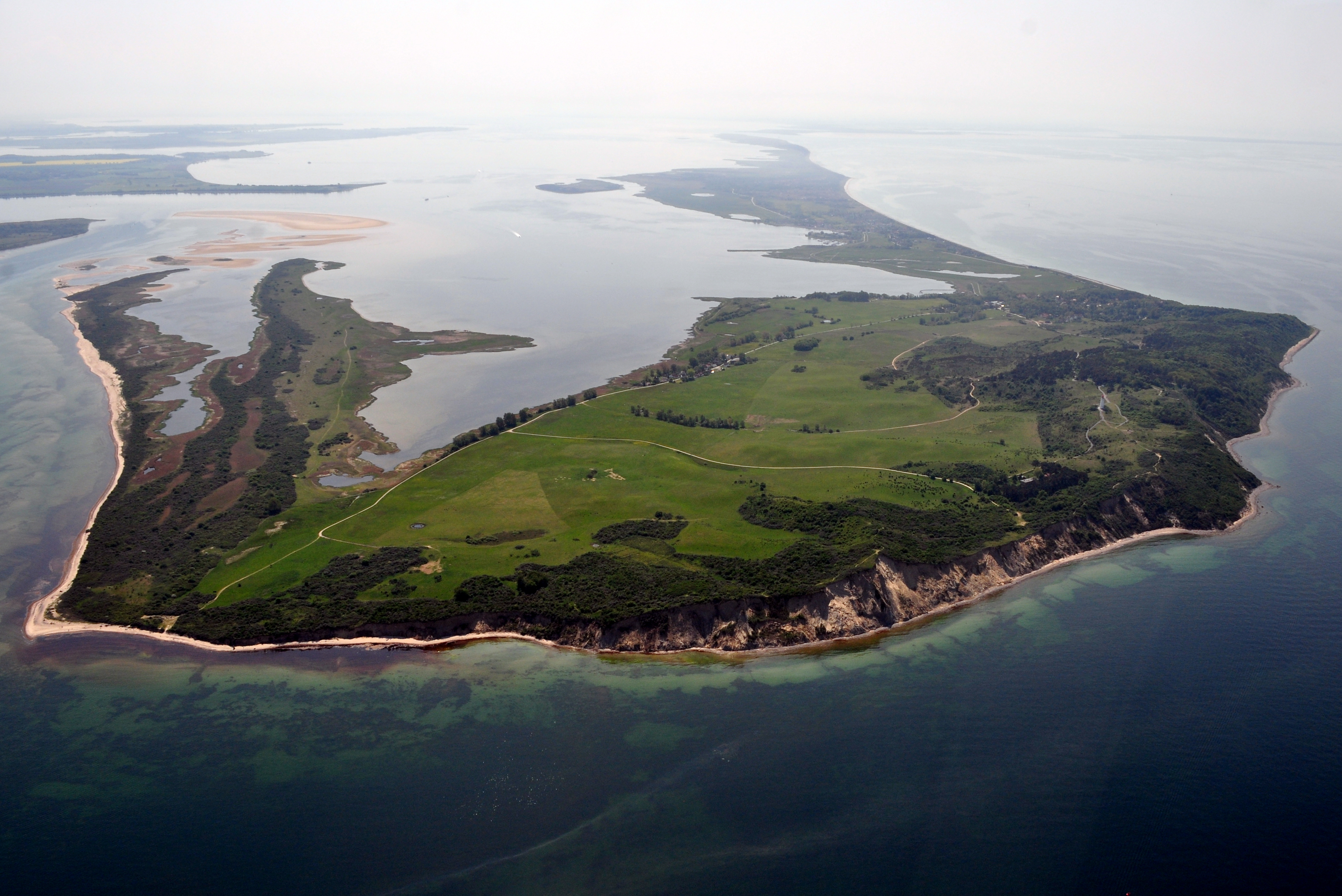
Aerial view of the cliff at the Dornbusch lighthouse, north hook of the island Hiddensee

==== Vitte ====
Vitte was first mentioned in a document in 1513. The name comes from Low German and means settlement of herring fishermen. Vitte soon developed into the largest town on the island due to its central location on the narrow island.

==== Glambeck (deserted village) ====
Along with Grieben, Glambeck was one of the two settlements existing on the island in Slavic times, the name means deep place. Already before 1700 the place became deserted. In the 21st century a field name one kilometer north of Neuendorf reminds of the former place.

==== Neuendorf ====
The village was established around 1700, probably as a replacement for the abandoned village of Glambeck. Here the character of the old fishing village has been preserved the most on the island. Its development structure with houses on a common meadow area without constructed paths is considered unique, the village as a whole is under monument protection.

==== Plogshagen ====
Plogshagen is a foundation from times of colonization by German settlers after the foundation of the monastery. The name is said to be derived from the personal name Plog. Today Plogshagen has largely grown together with Neuendorf.

== Geology ==
=== Overview ===
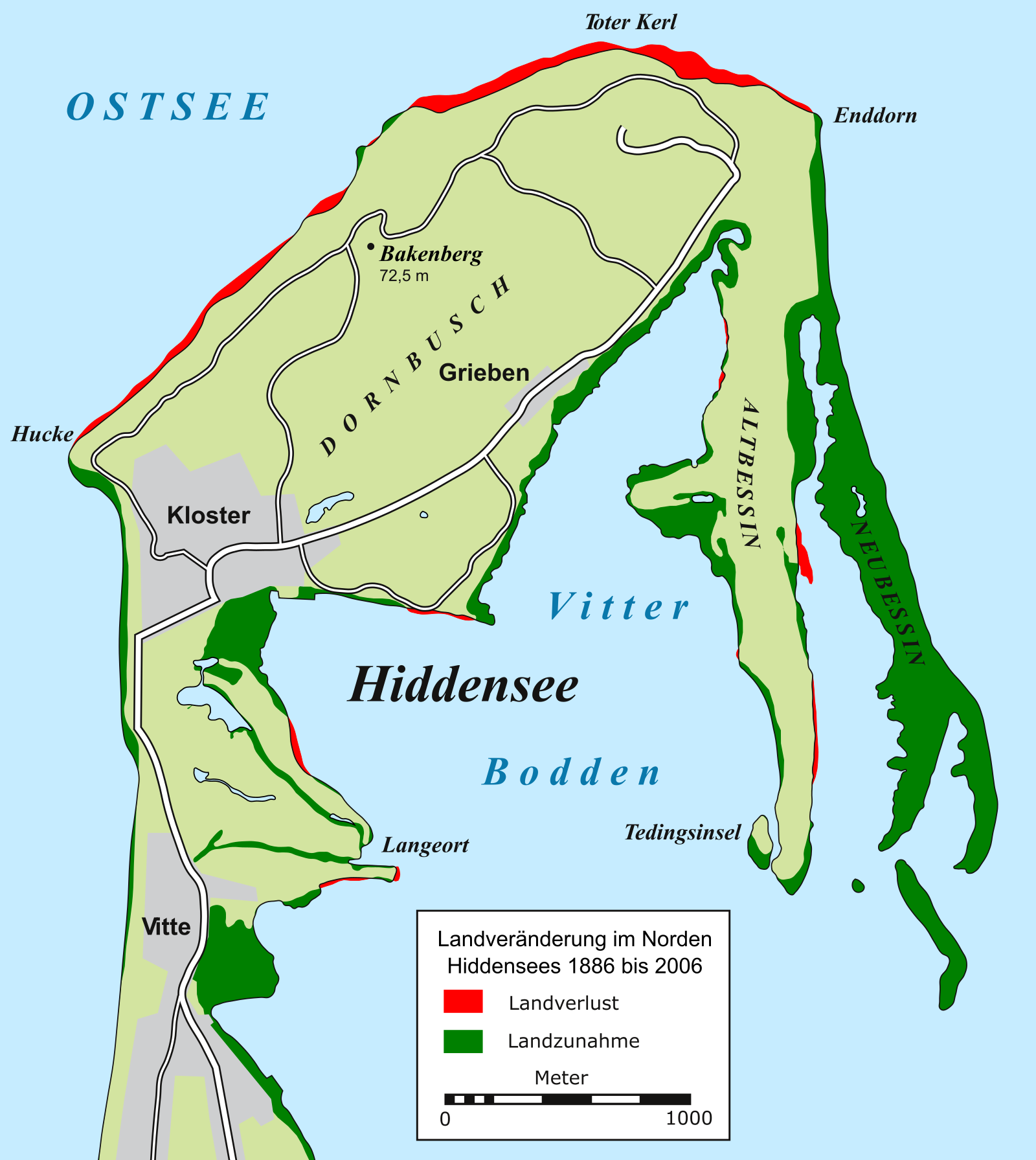
Land changes from 1886 to 2000

The island of Hiddensee is, from a geological perspective, a very young landscape and was formed during the last ice age about 12,000 years ago. The ice age left behind here a Young Drift landscape. As a result of thawing inland ice, the underlying land rose and the hollows filled with water; the predecessor of what became the Baltic Sea, Ancylus Lake emerged. As a result, only protruding ridges like the Dornbusch remained visible, as islands. The overall shape of the coast in the southern area of the Baltic Sea was formed during the Littorina Transgression about 7,000 to 2,500 years ago. Around 5,000 years ago, the sea level attained its present level and the Dornbusch and two older island cores became islands. 4,500 years ago the salt water currents from the North Sea were sharply reduced. The Baltic has slowly become less salty since. As a result of coastal erosion (land denudation, drift and deposition) the islands changed to their present shapes over the course of time. For example, the former three island cores were joined to one another by accretion. This process still carried sand away from the north of the Dornbusch. In 2000, 60,000 cubic metres (2.1 million cubic feet) of till twice broke off from the northern tip of the Hiddensee in the area of the Toter Kerl and collapsed into the sea. On average the cliff edges of the Dornbusch recede about 30 centimetres (1 ft) per year. In mid-March 2004 another 10,000 cubic metres (0.35 million cubic feet) collapsed into the sea. Geologically seen the Hiddensee is a region undergoing constant change. The landmasses carried away from its northern tip are washed up again at the southern end and on the east side of the Schaproder Bodden. This has caused the formation of two geologically recent spits at the southern end of the Gellen: the Alter Bessin und Neuer Bessin. The Alter Bessin began to appear about 300 to 400 years ago and was already over five kilometres (3 mi) long by the middle of the 19th century. Since then it has barely grown. On the other hand, the Neuer Bessin which appeared in 1900 is growing by 30 to 60 metres (100 to 200 ft) annually and is already 3 kilometres (1.9 mi) long. Meanwhile, a third Bessin is emerging. Even the southern tip is growing as a so-called windwatt into the Schaproder Bodden.

=== Hills, ravines and other natural forms ===
From the highlands in the north to the lowlands in the south, there are the following mountains, gorges and shapes (altitude above sea level in parentheses, rounded):

Toter Kerl; Bessin; End thorn (5 m); Swantiberg (65 m); Honey ground; Spring bog Ellersegen [natural monument]; Vorlege; Tiddenufer; Rabenberg (32 m); Bakenberg (73 m); highest elevation	Signalmasthuk/Fledermaushuk; Swantewitschlucht; Tietenufer; Rennbaumhuk; Klausnerbrüche; Klausnerhuk; Rübenberg (27 m) [Natural monument]; Hexenberg; Ziegelort; Schafort	Hucke; Harter Ort; Möwenort; Langeort; Hassenort; Poggenort; Fischerhaken; Klimphoresbucht; Gellen

== Climate ==
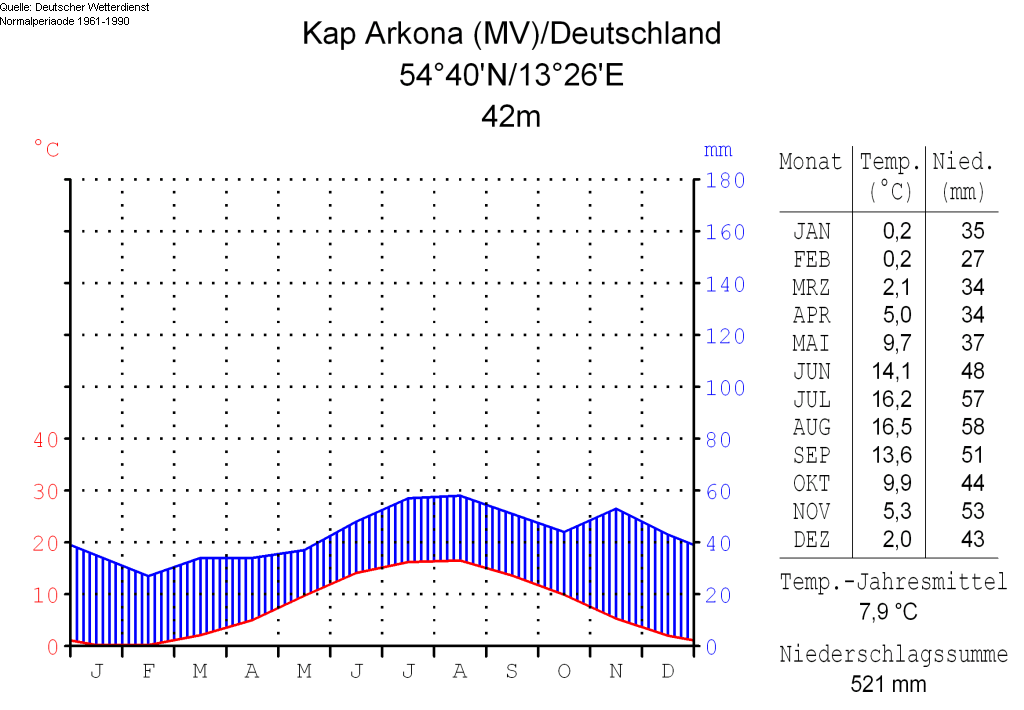
Climatic diagram for Cape Arkona

Hiddensee is dominated macro-climatically by the Baltic Sea coastal climate with frequent alternation between maritime and continental influences (Köppen: Cfb; Trewartha: Dobk). Characteristically it has frequent, brisk and changeable winds and long periods of sunshine. This averages 1,850 hours per year. As a result, Hiddensee is one of the sunniest places in Germany. One special feature is so-called transperiod wind circulation, when there are weak, offshore wind conditions, and which is caused by the different temperatures over the sea and land. This produces a sea breeze in late morning that abates in the afternoon or evening.

The longstanding annual average temperature on the island is 8 °C (46 °F). The average wind speed in Kloster is 7 metres per second (16 mph). In comparison to the nearby island of Rügen, the average annual precipitation on Hiddensee is markedly less at 540 millimetres (21 in).

In 2008, Hiddensee-Dornbusch was the sunniest place in Germany, as reported by the weather service, Meteomedia, with 2,168 hours of sunshine. The data was gathered by Meteomedia's own weather station (54.60°N 13.12°E; 69 m above NN).

The Hiddensee weather station has recorded the following extreme values:

- Its highest temperature was 35.0 °C (95.0 °F) on 10 July 2010.
- Its lowest temperature was −20.5 °C (−4.9 °F) on 17 February 1940.
- Its greatest annual precipitation was 894.1 mm (35.20 in) in 1960.
- Its least annual precipitation was 370.9 mm (14.60 in) in 1971.
- The longest annual sunshine was 1952.2 hours in 1975.
- The shortest annual sunshine was 1478.3 hours in 1978.

Climate data for Hiddensee-Vitte (1991–2020 normals, extremes 1931–present)
Month	Jan	Feb	Mar	Apr	May	Jun	Jul	Aug	Sep	Oct	Nov	Dec	Year
Record high °C (°F)	11.7 (53.1)	14.6 (58.3)	20.8 (69.4)	27.5 (81.5)	30.8 (87.4)	34.2 (93.6)	35.2 (95.4)	34.6 (94.3)	30.2 (86.4)	23.5 (74.3)	17.3 (63.1)	13.0 (55.4)	35.2 (95.4)
Mean maximum °C (°F)	7.7 (45.9)	8.5 (47.3)	13.7 (56.7)	19.4 (66.9)	24.1 (75.4)	26.7 (80.1)	28.0 (82.4)	28.0 (82.4)	24.4 (75.9)	17.9 (64.2)	12.7 (54.9)	8.9 (48.0)	29.9 (85.8)
Mean daily maximum °C (°F)	3.2 (37.8)	3.7 (38.7)	6.2 (43.2)	11.3 (52.3)	15.9 (60.6)	19.5 (67.1)	21.8 (71.2)	22.0 (71.6)	18.3 (64.9)	12.8 (55.0)	7.9 (46.2)	4.7 (40.5)	12.3 (54.1)
Daily mean °C (°F)	1.5 (34.7)	1.8 (35.2)	3.5 (38.3)	7.5 (45.5)	11.9 (53.4)	15.7 (60.3)	18.1 (64.6)	18.2 (64.8)	15.1 (59.2)	10.4 (50.7)	6.1 (43.0)	3.0 (37.4)	9.4 (48.9)
Mean daily minimum °C (°F)	−0.3 (31.5)	0.1 (32.2)	1.1 (34.0)	4.4 (39.9)	8.5 (47.3)	12.2 (54.0)	14.8 (58.6)	15.1 (59.2)	12.2 (54.0)	8.0 (46.4)	4.1 (39.4)	1.1 (34.0)	6.8 (44.2)
Mean minimum °C (°F)	−7.3 (18.9)	−6.3 (20.7)	−4.3 (24.3)	−0.9 (30.4)	3.2 (37.8)	7.7 (45.9)	11.1 (52.0)	10.9 (51.6)	7.1 (44.8)	2.6 (36.7)	−1.4 (29.5)	−5.3 (22.5)	−9.9 (14.2)
Record low °C (°F)	−20.0 (−4.0)	−20.5 (−4.9)	−18.2 (−0.8)	−6.8 (19.8)	−0.5 (31.1)	2.4 (36.3)	8.4 (47.1)	4.6 (40.3)	0.5 (32.9)	−5.0 (23.0)	−9.3 (15.3)	−16.5 (2.3)	−20.5 (−4.9)
Average precipitation mm (inches)	46.4 (1.83)	39.9 (1.57)	38.3 (1.51)	30.6 (1.20)	41.5 (1.63)	61.0 (2.40)	56.5 (2.22)	74.4 (2.93)	52.8 (2.08)	55.6 (2.19)	51.3 (2.02)	51.9 (2.04)	600.1 (23.63)
Average extreme snow depth cm (inches)	7.7 (3.0)	7.2 (2.8)	3.6 (1.4)	0.6 (0.2)	0 (0)	0 (0)	0 (0)	0 (0)	0 (0)	0 (0)	0.1 (0.0)	6.1 (2.4)	14.2 (5.6)
Average precipitation days (≥ 0.1 mm)	18.4	15.8	14.0	11.4	11.8	13.4	13.9	14.5	13.9	17.3	17.1	18.6	180.2
Average relative humidity (%)	87.8	86.7	84.0	80.3	79.0	79.3	79.4	79.9	81.7	84.6	87.5	88.0	83.2
Source: Deutscher Wetterdienst / SKlima.de

=== Storm flood ===
Again and again Hiddensee has been hit by storm flood. For example, the island is said to have been separated from the island of Rügen by the All Saints' Flood in 1304, but this has not been proven with certainty. In 1864 and 1865 Hiddensee was breached three times by storm floods between Hohen Dünschen Garn and Peterbergschen Garn, a very shallow and thin area. The 1872 Baltic Sea flood flooded the island again near Plogshagen. There is still a threat of the island being divided into a southern and a northern part, which could only be prevented by extensive coastal protection measures.

== Flora and fauna ==
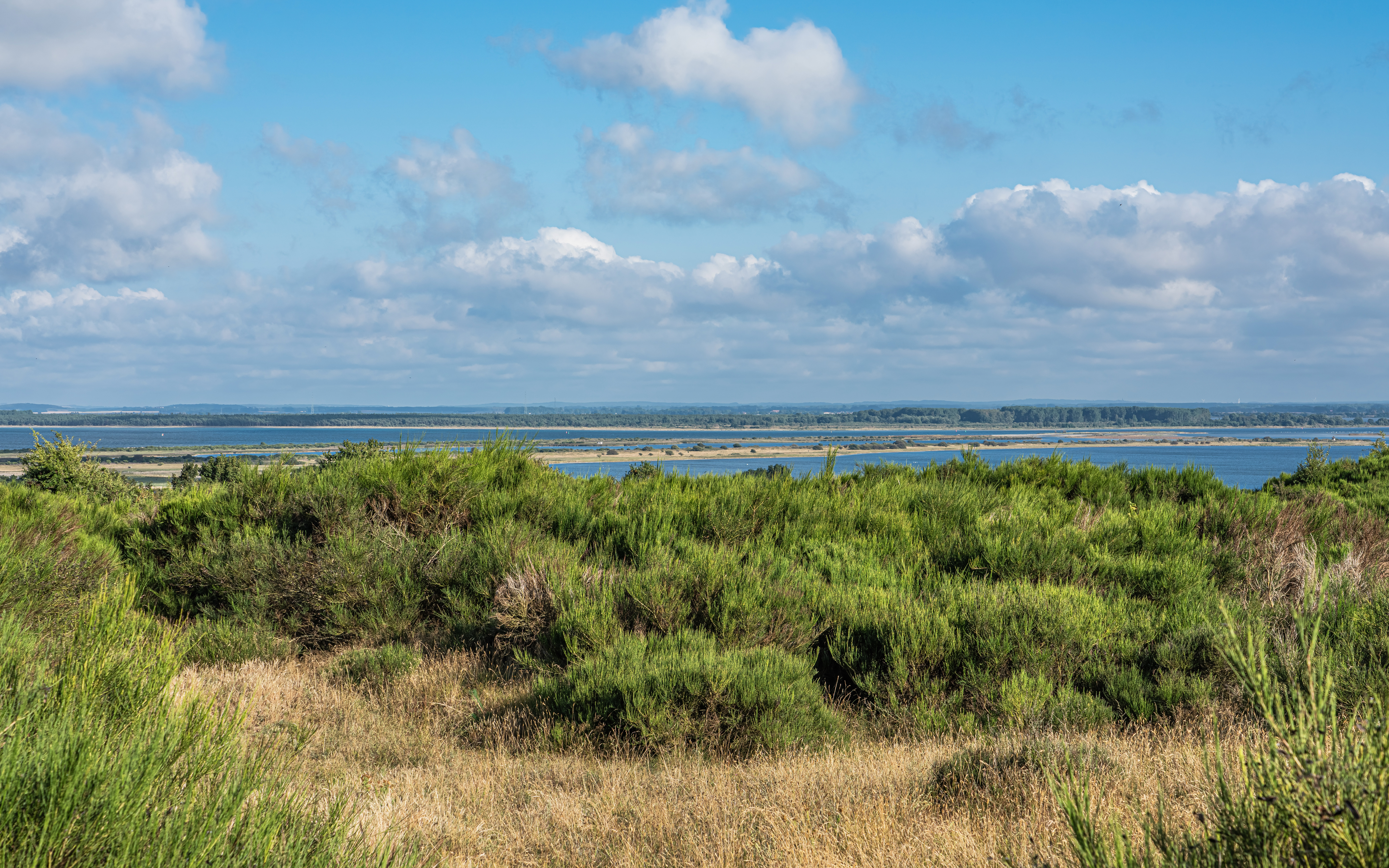
View from Hiddensee towards Rügen

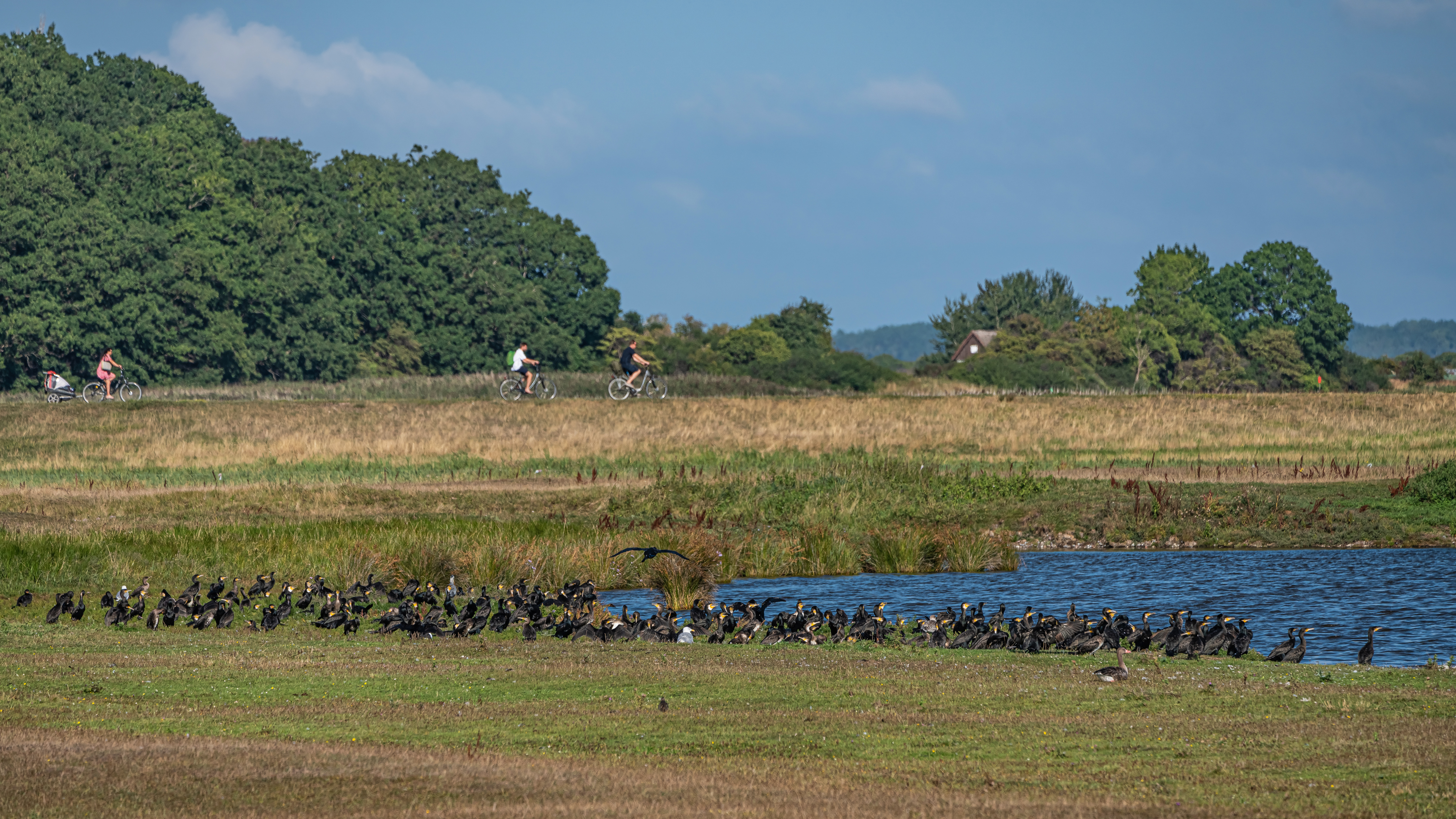
Cormorants on Hiddensee

Hiddensee is the largest island in the Western Pomerania Lagoon Area National Park and blends an old cultural landscape with the wood pastures of the original dune heathland. The large accumulations of new land in the northeast (Alter and Neuer Bessin) and south (at the Gellen) of Hiddensee offer habitats for numerous invertebrates, such as worms and mussels. These in turn provide nourishment for many migrating birds. For example, the area around the island is one of the most important crane roosting areas in Germany. The southern tip of the island is, like the Neuer Bessin was therefore classified as conservation zone I of the national park und is out-of-bounds. On the island are two nature reserves, the Dünenheide auf der Insel Hiddensee Nature Reserve between Neuendorf and Vitte and the Dornbusch und Schwedenhagener Ufer Nature Reserve in the north.

The Naturschutzgesellschaft Hiddensee und Boddenlandschaft maintains a national park house in Vitte, with a permanent exhibition of fauna and flora.

In 1936 the Hiddensee Bird Observatory was established on the island.

== Population development ==
The population of Hiddensee has been in long-term decline. While an estimated 1,261 people lived on the island in 1990, by 2001 the number had fallen to 1,173, and the 2011 census recorded 995 inhabitants. The 2022 census showed a further drop to 942. As of 31 December 2024, the municipality had 913 inhabitants (480 women, 433 men), of whom 112 were under eighteen and 312 over sixty-five. The average age was 51.5 years, well above the national average.

== Subdivisions ==
The municipality of Insel Hiddensee ("Island of Hiddensee") has four subdivisions (from north to south):

=== Grieben ===
Grieben is the oldest, northernmost and smallest village on Hiddensee and lies on the eastern edge of the uplands of the island. Its name comes from the Slavic grib (for "mushroom"). Grieben has no harbour of its own.

=== Kloster ===
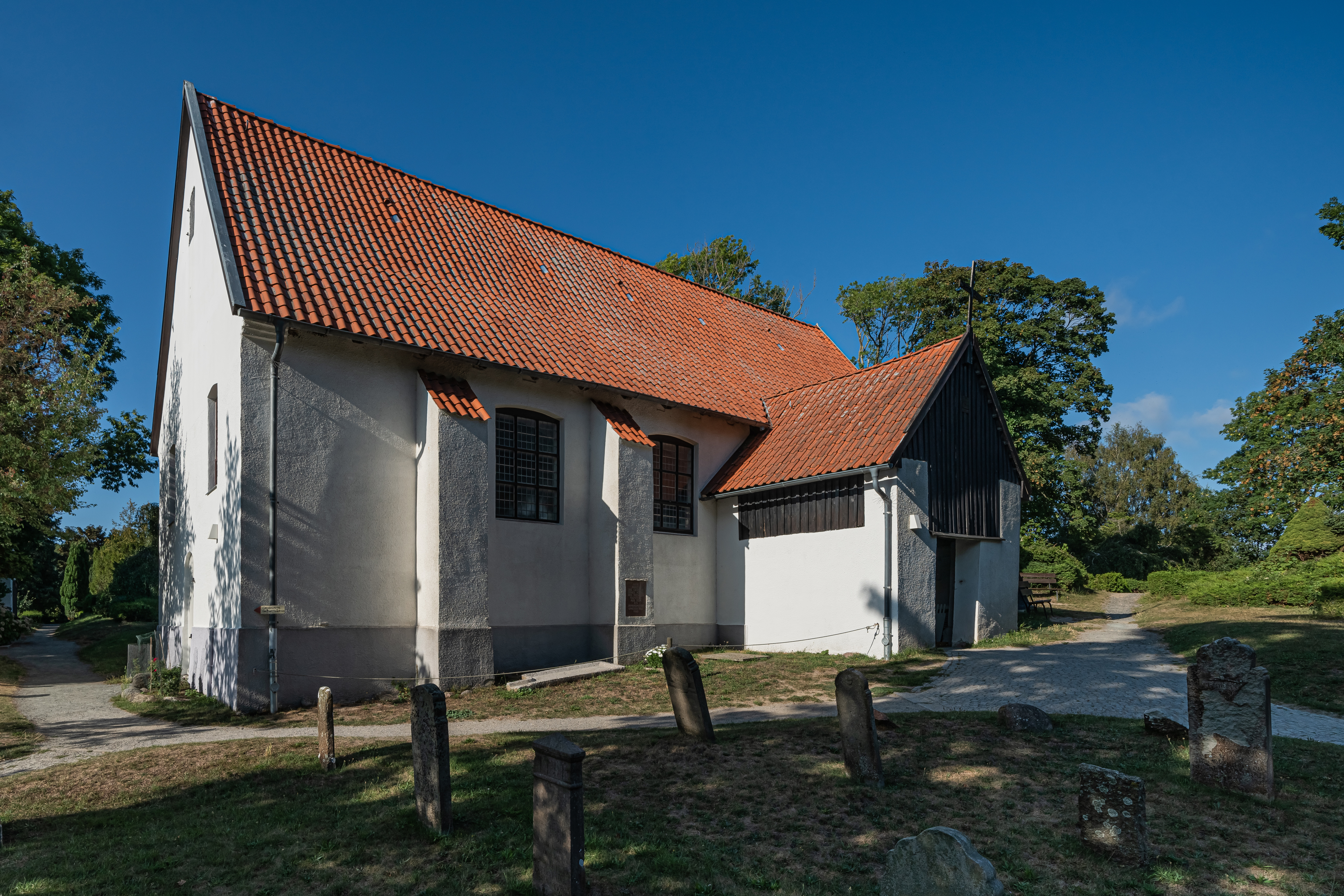
Church of Kloster

The parish of Kloster gets its name from the former Cistercian abbey, which stood from 1296 to 1536 in the vicinity of the present harbour in Kloster. It was dissolved with the Reformation. Today Kloster with its Gerhart Hauptmann Haus, the island church and island cemetery with the graves of Gerhart Hauptmann, Walter Felsenstein and Gret Palucca is the cultural centre of Hiddensee. It lies on the edge of the uplands (Hochland), whose highest point is the Dornbusch. In Kloster are the Hiddensee Biological Station and the Hiddensee Bird Observatory, both branches of the University of Greifswald, which were both formed out of the Hiddensee Biological Research Institute, founded in 1930.

=== Vitte ===
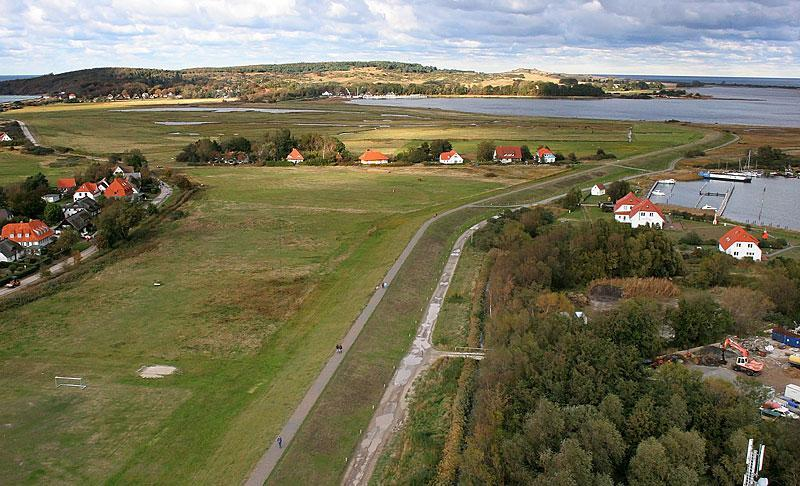
Aerial photograph between Vitte and Kloster

Vitte (pronounced: Fitte), first mentioned in 1513, is the main settlement and the largest and most central village on the island. The name is a derivation of vit; a word that was used to refer to places where fish was sold. In Vitte is the parish hall and council administration. In addition there is the ferry landing stage for the goods ferry that brings delivery and waste disposal vehicles from Schaprode on the island of Rügen. Goods are transferred to trailers that are pulled by electric tractors and distributed to the food markets and restaurants on the island. Sometimes smaller goods are still delivered by horse and cart. The heath landscape on Hiddensee, between Vitte and Neuendorf, is also part of Vitte. In Vitte is the oldest surviving house on the island, the Witch's House (German: Hexenhaus), the old summer house for Adolf Reichwein. In addition there is the last tented cinema and the puppet theatre Seebühne Hiddensee.

=== Neuendorf ===
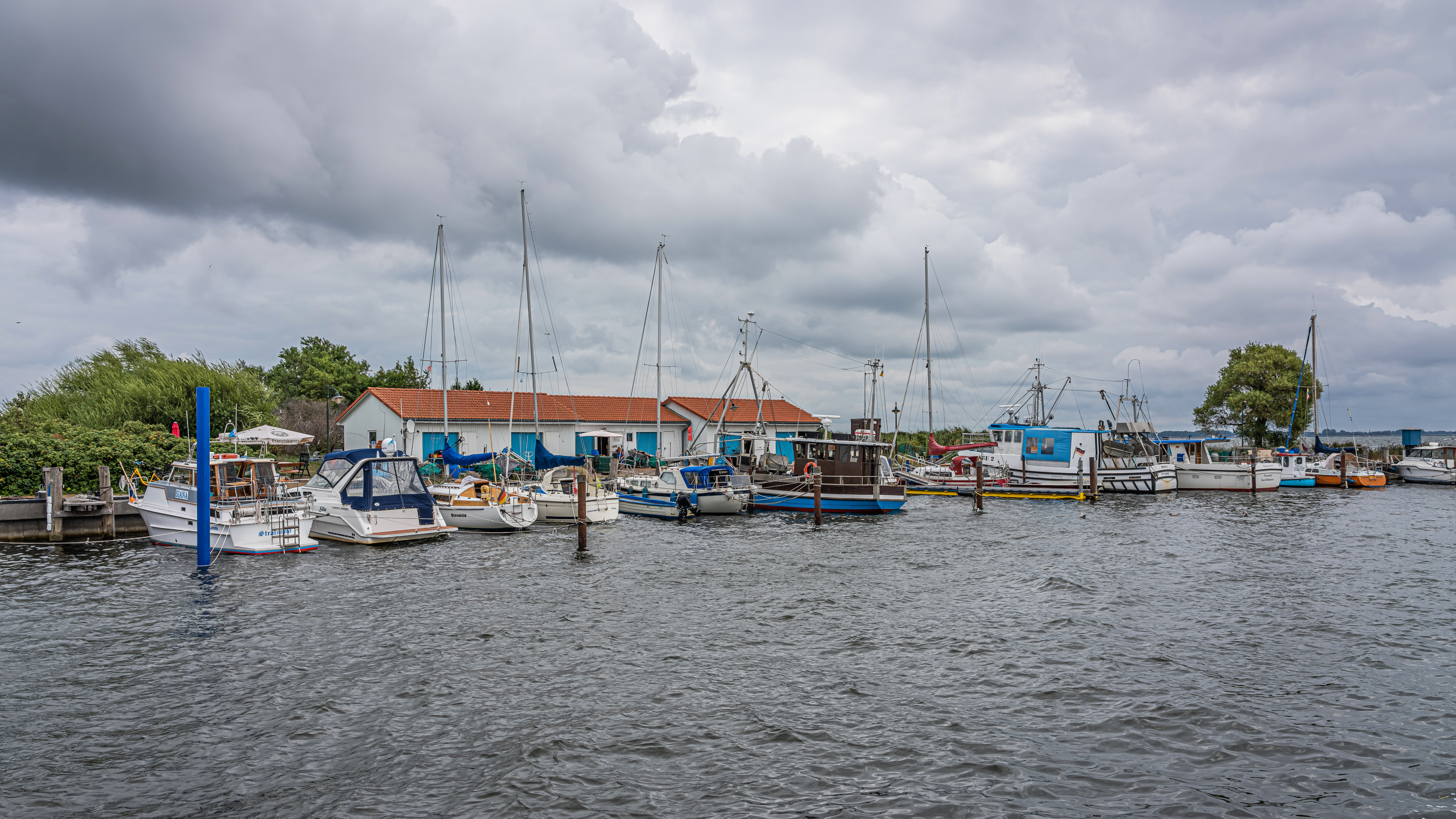
Neuendorf harbour

Neuendorf is the southernmost settlement on Hiddensee. The inhabitants of Neuendorf are known by the rest of the island as the Southerners (German: Die Süder). Although Neuendorf is only six kilometres (3.7 mi) from Vitte, its inhabitants speak a different dialect. Large parts of Neuendorf resemble a large pasture on which the houses are arranged like a piece of string. There are no paths in places, so that some addresses may only be reached by walking over the grass. Neuendorf has its own harbour.

Neuendorf consists of two originally independent villages: the older one, Plogshagen, existed as early as the 13th century and the actual Neuendorf, which was formed in 1700 by relocation of people from Glambek. Ruins of these settlements are still recognisable today northeast of Neuendorf parish.

South of Neuendorf lies the so-called Gellen, an important bird reserve that belongs to conservation zone I of the West Pomeranian Lagoon Area National Park and is thus out-of-bounds to the public.

== History ==
=== Stone Age to the end of the 17th century ===
The first settlements on the island took place in the middle and younger Stone Age. After a large part of the Germanic population had left the southern Baltic region in the 6th century AD, the Rani (Slavs) took possession of the island. The Hiddensee treasure, as well as the name of the islet, testify that the area was then in the sphere of influence of the Vikings in the 9th/10th century. In 1168 the Rans were defeated by King Waldemar I of Denmark by conquering the fortress Jaromarsburg at Cape Arkona on Rügen, Christianized and brought under Danish feudal dependence. Hiddensee was thus under Danish sovereignty. On 13 April 1296 the prince of Rügen, Wizlaw II, donated the island of Hiddensee, "as it was surrounded by the salt sea", to the Neuenkamp Abbey. There, a Cistercian abbey named Nikolaikamp was founded, named after St. Nicholas as the patron saint of sailors. In fact, the monastery was called Kloster Hiddensee for the entire time of its existence.

In the fall of 2008, archaeologists excavating under the direction of medieval archaeologist Felix Biermann discovered ten burials on the grounds of the former Cistercian monastery. Nine graves were found north of the monastery church and one in the cloister east of the west wing of the enclosure. Bettina Jungklaus anthropologically examined the skeletons of seven male and two female adults and one young girl. One 20- to 30-year-old male exhibited a healed slash wound to the right frontal bone. There was a joint burial of a 50-60-year-old man with a 14-15-year-old girl, where the man held the youth's left arm with his right hand. The disease burden was strikingly low. Tartar and periodontal disease were found most frequently. Caries was found on only one set of teeth, which was unusually low for medieval populations.

Simultaneously with the construction of the monastery, the Gellenkirche, a small beacon called Luchte, and the first harbor were built on the Gellen in the south of the island in the years 1302 to 1306. The foundations of these structures are located (today) west of the Gellen in the Baltic Sea.

In 1332, the consecration of the Island Church, intended for the farmers and fishermen of the island, took place in today's Kloster district outside the monastery walls. With the transfer of the baptismal font from the Gellenkirche to the new church, pastoral duties have been carried out from there ever since. The barrel vault, built in around 1781, received a painting with rose decoration by the Berlin painter Nikolaus Niemeier in 1922.

In the course of the Reformation, the monastery was dissolved in 1536. During the Thirty Years' War from 1618 to 1648, soldiers burned down the mixed oak forest on the Dornbusch on Wallenstein's orders in 1628, thus depriving the Danes of the opportunity to extract timber. Even in the 21st century, the ash layer from that time can still be seen on the roadsides near the lighthouse a few centimeters below the turf. In the years from 1648 to 1815, Hiddensee, like the whole of Western Pomerania, was under Swedish administration.

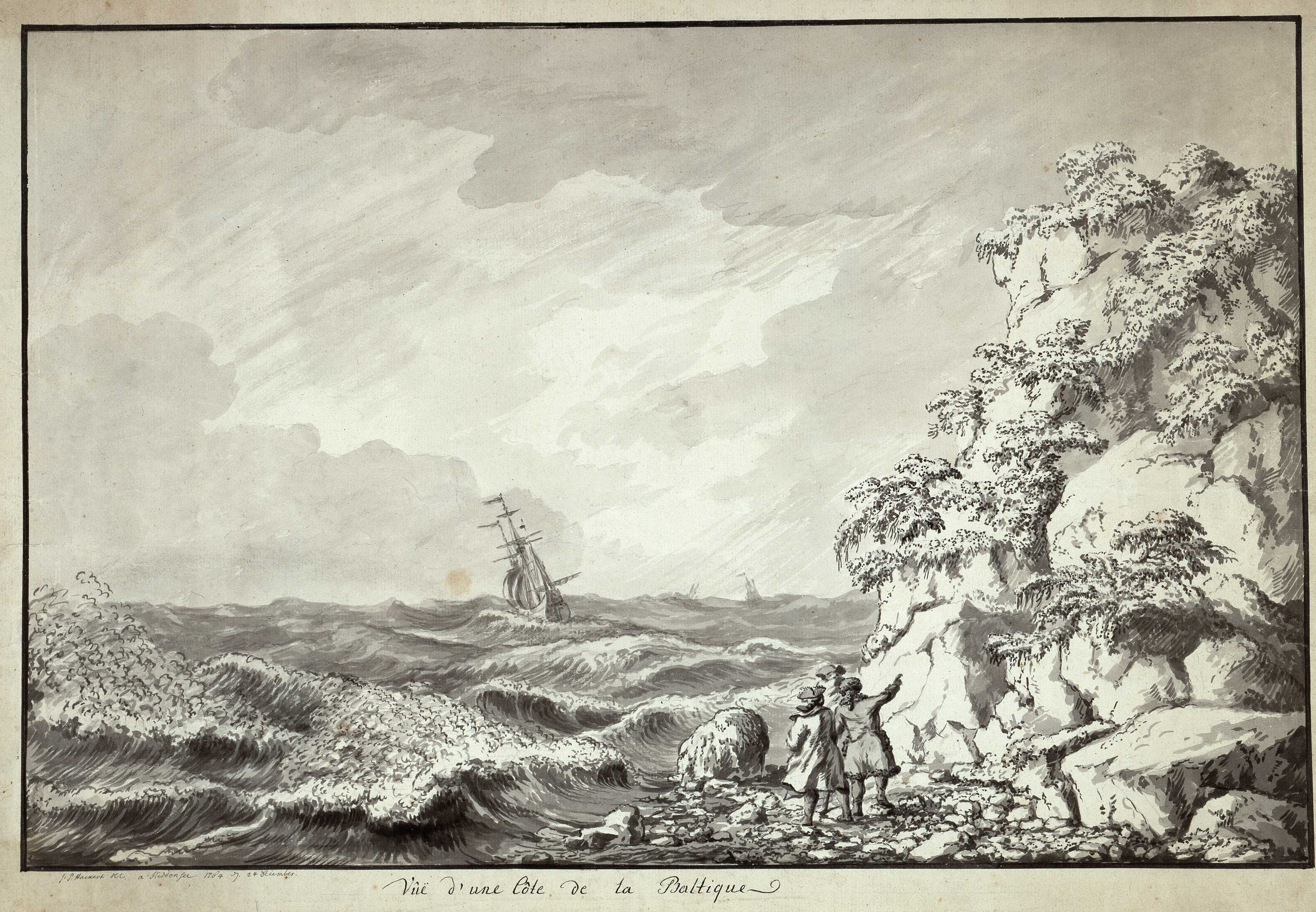
Jakob Philipp Hackert - On Hiddensee at the time of Giese, 1764

From 1754 to 1780, Joachim Ulrich Giese was the owner of the island and began mining clay for the Stralsunder Fayencenmanufaktur he founded.

=== 19th century to the end of the Second World War ===
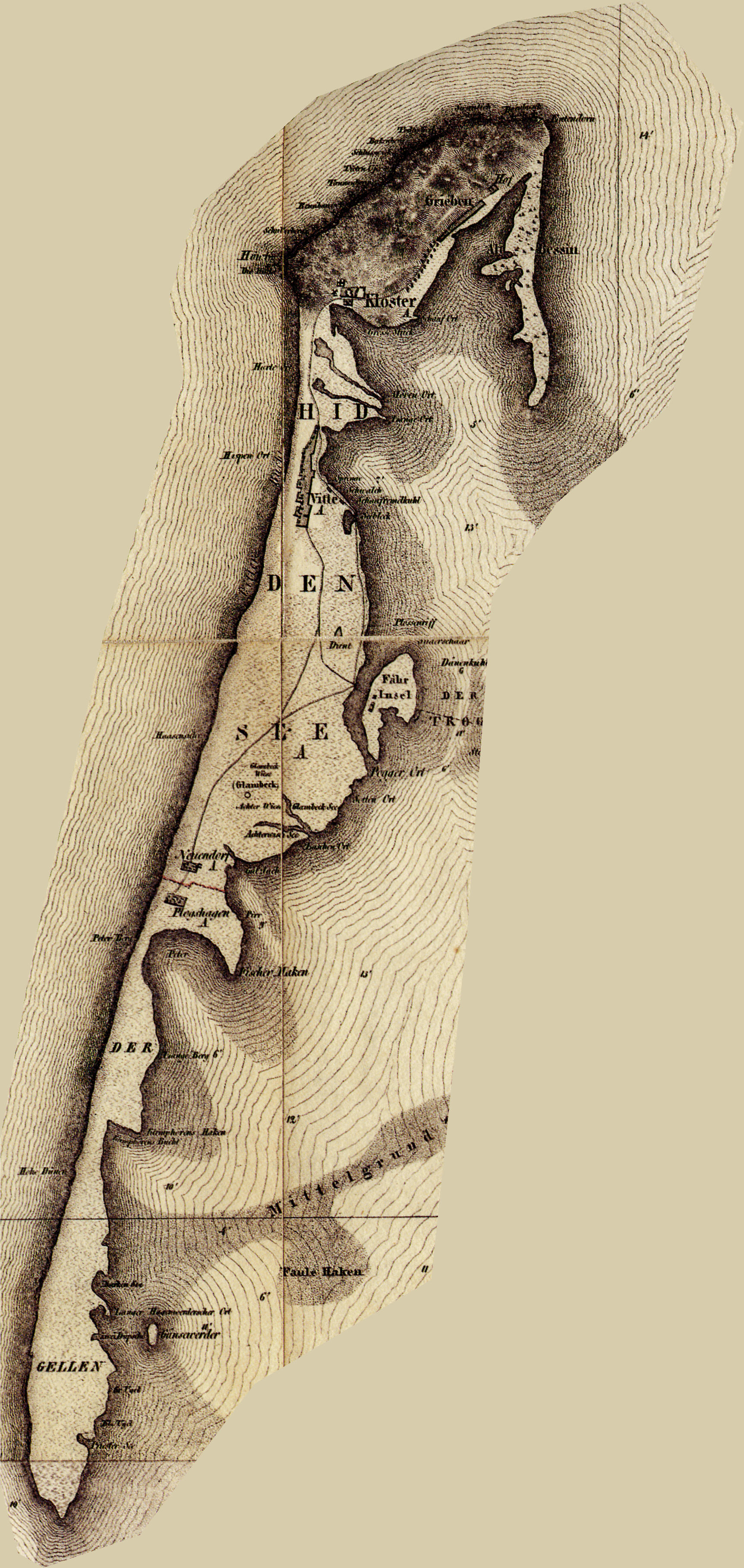
Detail Special Charte Island of Rügen (1829)

From 1800 to 1836 the island belonged to captain and Knight Wilhelm Friedrich Ludwig von Bagewitz (1777–1835) on Ralow. He increased the levies, drove the people of Hiddensee to 104 days of forced labor annually on his estates and prevented a school for the children. Under him, the free peasants in Grieben became serfs. Even when King Gustav II Adolf of Sweden abolished serfdom in 1806, nothing changed on Hiddensee.

From 1815, Hiddensee and Vorpommern belonged to Prussia until the end of World War II and was assigned to the district of Rügen (until 1939, the district of Rügen). In 1836, Stralsund's Holy Spirit Monastery acquired the island, and the first schools on the island were built in Plogshagen and Kloster in 1837 and 1840, respectively. In the years between 1854 and 1864, a reorganization of the land relations also took place on Hiddensee in the context of the redemption of the real burdens (liberation of farmers).

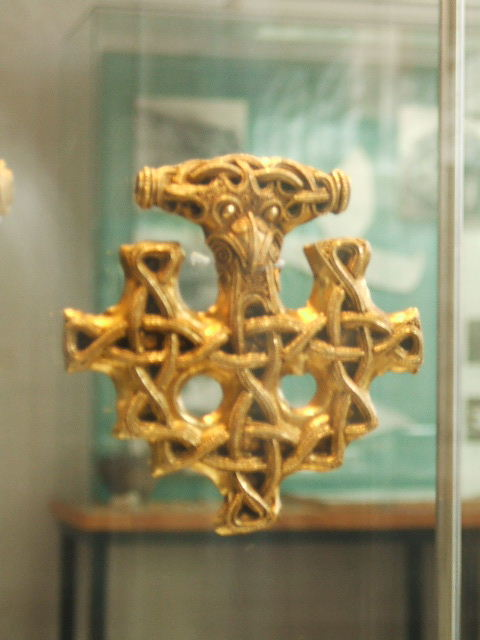
Cross of Hiddensee treasure in Stralsund

Until 1861, Hiddensee was virtually treeless for decades, except for the barren willow avenue between the monastery and Grieben and a few pines planted there around 1770, as well as a few trees at Schwedenhagen and Rübenberg. The dense oak tree population on Hiddensee, which still existed in the 13th century, had been almost completely decimated for firewood, house and ship building by the beginning of the 17th century. That the slash-and-burn in 1628 by Wallenstein would have destroyed the forest, as the legend would have it, is unlikely, because already on the map of Rügen by Eilhard Lubin from 1602 no tree symbol is drawn on Hiddensee anymore and the thorn bush is shown as bare hilly land. First in 1861 the Dornbusch between Bakenberg and Hucke was planted with pines, around 1900 also the Dornbusch north of Bakenberg, the coastal section from Hucke to the museum of local history as well as from there along the coast to Gellen (Karkensee). The section of coast in front of Vitte was excluded from this, because the Vitter rejected the government's offered reforestation for the reason that access to the beach for tourists would then be impeded.

In 1864 and 1872, the island was hit by severe storm floods. During the first flood, Hiddensee broke in two due to a complete flooding at the narrowest point of the island, south of Neuendorf, which could only be reversed by extensive reconstruction measures six years later. After the second storm flood, the Hiddensee treasure, a Viking work from the 10th century, is said to have been found. A replica of it can be seen in the Hiddensee Museum of Local History, the original is on display in the Stralsund Museum.

In 1874, the district of Hiddensee was formed in the German Empire. In 1875, the painter Gustav Schönleber "discovered" Hiddensee, which was difficult to access. In 1888 the lighthouse on the Dornbusch, the harbor and the sea rescue station were completed in Kloster. In 1887 the bulwark in Kloster was built, and in 1905 and 1907 the steamer landing bridges in Vitte and Neuendorf. From this time on, larger ships could dock directly on Hiddensee and the adventurous mooring or disembarking at the level of the ferry island was no longer necessary. From 1892 onwards, steamships operated regularly between Stralsund and Kloster for the first time. From 1905, with the founding of the medical association, the first doctor on Hiddensee received his license.

With the almost simultaneous construction of five large hotels in Kloster (Haus Hitthim in 1909, Zum Klausner in 1911, Wieseneck and Haus am Meer - the later Vogelwarte - both in 1913, and in the same year the Dornbusch, which had been expanded from an inn to a hotel), the number of tourists increased by leaps and bounds and Kloster became the island's main tourist resort.

With the founding of the Hiddensee Nature Conservation Association, the Fährinsel was declared a nature reserve in 1910 and Gellen and Gänsewerder in 1922 by the Prussian government. The status of a nature reserve was given to the Dornbusch, the Schwedenhagener Ufer and the Altbessin in 1937.

From 1916 to 1921, the photographer Elfriede Reichelt visited the island several times. Between 1922 and 1925, Max Taut built a house on Hiddensee every year. The most famous is the Karusel in Vitte, built in 1922, which the silent film actress Asta Nielsen bought as a residence in 1928 and for which Bruno Taut had designed the color concept of the house. Just near Karusel is another house by Max Taut, Haus Weidermann, built in 1923 for the Berlin merchant Karl Weidermann. In Kloster stand the Haus Pingel, built for the interior designer Walter Pingel in 1924 (significantly altered structurally in the 1960s), and right next to it the house built in 1925 for the Berlin publisher Max Gehlen, which has been on the grounds of the Biological Station of Hiddensee since 1930 and is used as a doctoral student house.

In 1927, a police regulation was issued prohibiting the use of motor vehicles on the island. Only the island doctor and the local police were allowed to use a motorcycle. In the same year the island was connected to the electricity grid and three years later the Biological Research Station was founded by Erich Leick from the University of Greifswald, which together with an ornithological station became the Biological Research Institute of Hiddensee in 1936.

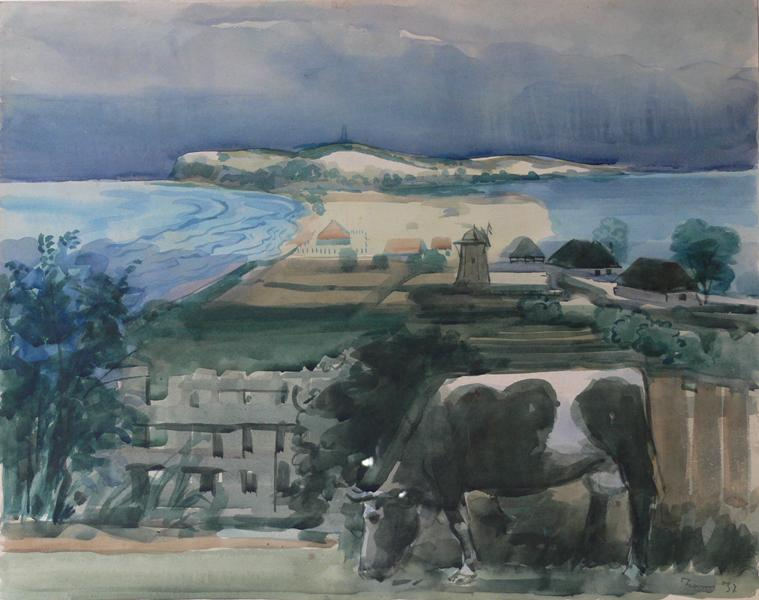
Hiddensee: Watercolor painting on paper by Ernst Thoms, 1937

In 1937, work began on the large stone embankment with stone groynes in front of the Hucke. It was planned to protect the entire approximately four-kilometer-long break-off bank of the Dornbusch with a rampart. In addition to protecting the island, the intention was to limit sand drift in order to save the costs of constant dredging at the Gellen channel and in the Stralsund fairway. The outbreak of World War II put an end to the construction work, only four hundred meters were completed and remained so until today. After the construction of the Huckemauer, the beach at Kloster and Vitte deteriorated, suffering from a lack of sand.

Between 1937 and 1939, the three communities on the island merged to form the municipality of Hiddensee. Until before 1939, according to the last officially published Güter-Adressbuch Pommern, the family of Paul Wüstenberg was the tenant of the 239 ha Stadtgutes Kloster Hiddensee. According to genealogical sources of the Deutsches Geschlechterbuch, his family withdrew from the estate already around 1937. He was succeeded by Rüdiger von Hagen, brother of Albrecht von Hagen, who later became a short-time curator of the University of Greifswald. The family of Paul Wüstenberg was the tenant of the 239 ha town estate.

At the end of the 1930s, bunkers and anti-aircraft weapons were built at Enddorn for air defense during World War II, as well as a jetty at Schwedenhagen for material transport. The bunkers were blown up by the Soviet Army in 1945 (the debris was not removed until the 2000s) and the jetty was developed by VEB Erdöl-Erdgas Grimmen for experimental oil drilling in the 1960s. The pier was subsequently used, from 1974, by a pusher for island supply and demolished in 2010.

=== 1945 until 1989 ===
On 4–5 May 1945 Soviet troops occupied the island. In the same year as in the following year, the Hiddensee estate was divided into 18 new farms as part of the land reform.

On 28 July 1946 Gerhart Hauptmann was buried in the cemetery in Kloster (Hiddensee Island). The memorial stone was unveiled exactly five years later, on 28 July 1951.

In 1952, the second ferry service between Seehof on Rügen and the ferry island had to be discontinued.

Between 1958 and 1959, the VEB Fahrzeug- und Jagdwaffenwerk "Ernst Thälmann" built a vacation village for its employees in Dünenheide. Right next to it, the Bau- und Montagekombinat Industrie- und Hafenbau Stralsund built another vacation village for its employees in 1980/81.

From 1952 to 1955, Hiddensee belonged administratively to the Bergen district. In 1953, during Aktion Rose, some hoteliers fled to the West, others were arrested. After this action, all hotels on the island were expropriated and handed over to the FDGB. In the fifties the local history museum and the Gerhart Hauptmann Haus opened; the LPG Dornbusch was founded.

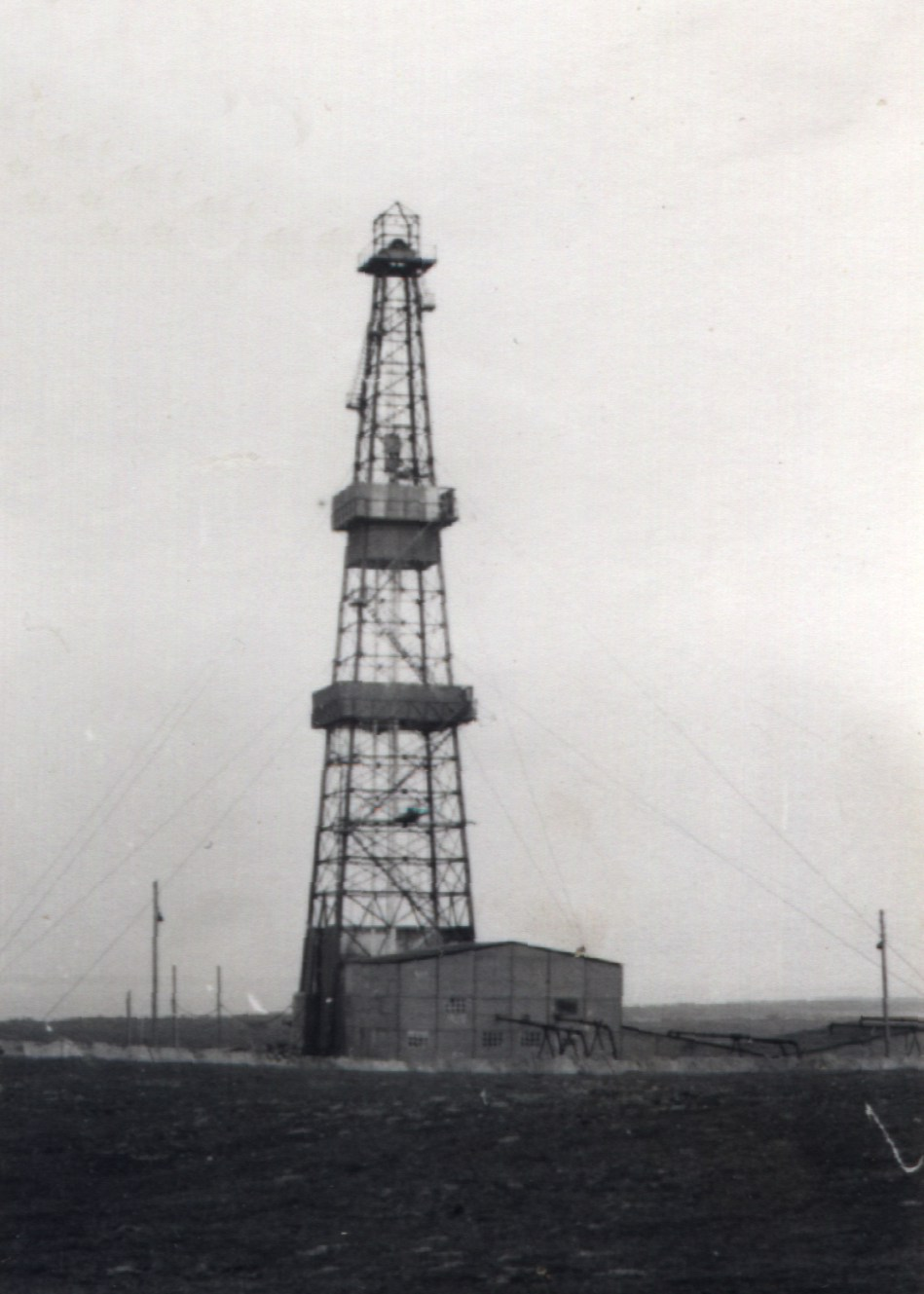
Oil rig in May 1967 north of Grieben

In 1962, dike construction began between Kloster and Vitte. With the diking of the meadows and pastures along the Bodden coast, the largest transformation of Hiddensee began. In Vitte, the Bodden water previously went as far as the streets Wiesenweg, Norderende and Zum Seglerhafen. Large parts of today's harbor of Vitte as well as the whole area with today's sports field, the heliport and the sailing harbor Lange Ort were artificially washed up or drained. Also in Kloster parts of the Bodden were drained, which before the dike construction had still extended from the harbor to far behind Höhe Postweg.

The Weiße Flotte Stralsund took over the cooperative shipping company and the fishermen founded the FPG'n De Süder in Neuendorf and Swantevit in Vitte.

On 10 April 1967 petroleum exploration began as a result of seismic surveys in the north of the island of Hiddensee with the E Rügen 2/67 research well. This 4,602 m deep well, as well as the wells E Hiddensee 3/67, 4/68 and 5/68 that followed until December 1968, did not yield any exploitable oil deposits. The 5th well, which had already been prepared, was cancelled, and all wells were plugged in the summer of 1971. The crude oil produced up to that point was shipped by tanker from a temporary port near Kloster to the Soviet Union for examination and processing.

Until 1971, the site of the 5. Technische Beobachtungskompanie Dornbusch of the NVA was built between the pension Zum Klausner and the Dornbusch lighthouse. Behind a double fence, with dog run in between, there was an ammunition bunker and other buildings. The facility was dismantled in 1993 and the bunker was covered with earth. Since then, the former access road, the plate road from Kloster, which forks shortly before Klausner, leads to the right into "nothingness".

In 1972/73, the connecting roads between the villages were paved with concrete slabs, except for a gap of about 500 m between Vitte and Kloster, which existed for many years due to an incipient shortage of building material, and which is still recognizable today as the only asphalted road section. In 1974, the domestic waste dumps on the outskirts of all localities were covered and a central waste dump was built for them near Swantiberges. This was exhausted in the early nineties. Since 1993, all garbage is collected in the port of Vitte and transported to Rügen.

On 7 May 1989, 4.7 percent of the votes cast in the GDR local elections on Hiddensee were against the government. Hiddensee was considered a niche for dissidents and dropouts, who often worked in hotels, restaurants or as lifeguards in the summer. On the small island, they were easy to control, and despite sometimes open Stasi surveillance, some incidents and meetings were accepted. An intellectual climate prevailed on Hiddensee, and artists, writers, actors, musicians and scientists retreated there, such as Jo Harbort, Christine Harbort, Günter Kunert, Kurt Böwe, Harry Kupfer, Inge Keller, Günther Fischer, Armin Mueller-Stahl, Christoph Hein, Robert Rompe or members of the punk band Feeling B.

The bodies of people who were shot during escape attempts across the Baltic Sea, mostly in a folding kayak, or who perished without outside interference, were also found again and again on the beaches of Hiddensee, such as those of 18-year-old Friedrich Klein and Ernst August Utpaddel (both in February 1962) and 21-year-old Uwe Richter (in August 1987). But Hiddensee was also the starting point for one of the most spectacular escapes from the GDR and the only one with a surfboard, in November 1986, by 30-year-old Karsten Klünder and 22-year-old Dirk Deckert one day later. In the early morning of each day, both of them sailed from Gellen to the Danish island of Møn, 70 kilometers away, in a good four hours with homemade surfboards and sails.

=== From 1989 ===
After the reunification, a new pier for the cargo ferry was completed in Vitte. Some sailors then used the old concrete pier of the push boat in Kloster as a sailing harbor. From the 2010s, a yachting harbor with sanitary facilities was created during the largest harbor renovation project in Kloster.

In 1992, the research facilities at the Schwedenhagen test site of Central Institute for Electron Physics in Berlin and the Ferry Island test site of Central Institute for Microbiology and Experimental Therapy in Jena were abandoned.

Hiddensee was also the site of the large-scale electric vehicle test launched in 1992 by the Federal Ministry of Research and the automotive industry. In the course of the test, a large solar system was installed on the roof of a building at the port of Vitte, which still exists today.

In May 2010, the tent cinema in Vitte had to be closed after 46 years. After a transitional period at changing locations, a new tent cinema opened at Vitte harbor in 2012, with Jörg Mehrwald as its director until 2020.

Between 2010 and 2014, some roads were repaved or paved at all and the local roads were widened by a good 50 percent (Vitte-Neuendorf 2010 and Kloster-Vitte 2014). In Vitte, a helipad went into operation in 2012 for emergency patients and for a disaster situation.

In October 2019, a new island bus with electric drive was put into operation. The predecessor ran on diesel and was thus still one of the few combustion vehicles on the island, after the police had also switched to an electric car in September 2015.

Due to the COVID-19 pandemic, the island was closed to tourists for some time in 2020.

At the beginning of 2021, it became known that the municipality of Hiddensee would like to expand the harbor in Vitte. Plans include a 135-place yachting harbor, a multipurpose hall, a 5590-square-meter photovoltaic system, a seawater desalination plant in a twelve-meter tower, two piers, an expansion of the ferry dock for cruise ships, and several other buildings. A citizens' initiative has been formed against the expansion plans.

== Economy ==
The inhabitants of the island live mainly from tourism. The majority of visitors are day tourists. Annually, Hiddensee has about 50,000 overnight guests, compared to about 250,000 day visitors.

Even before 1990, Hiddensee was a popular vacation spot. In the 1970s, up to 4,000 vacationers and 3,000 day trippers were on the island every day during the peak season. By the mid-1980s, the number of day visitors had risen to nearly 250,000 annually. Due to the desired naturalness, the tourism sector was hardly developed further, and the number of visitors has hardly changed since then. In 2002, Hiddensee had just under 3,300 guest beds.

A considerable part of Hiddensee's area is used for agricultural purposes.

== Education ==
School children have been taught on the island since 1788. In the beginning this was done by the sexton. The first school in Vitte was founded on 2 November 1887. After the restructuring in connection with the German reunification in 1990, the Vitte school became a secondary school. Currently, 69 students are taught from first to tenth grade (as of 2019).

== Transport ==
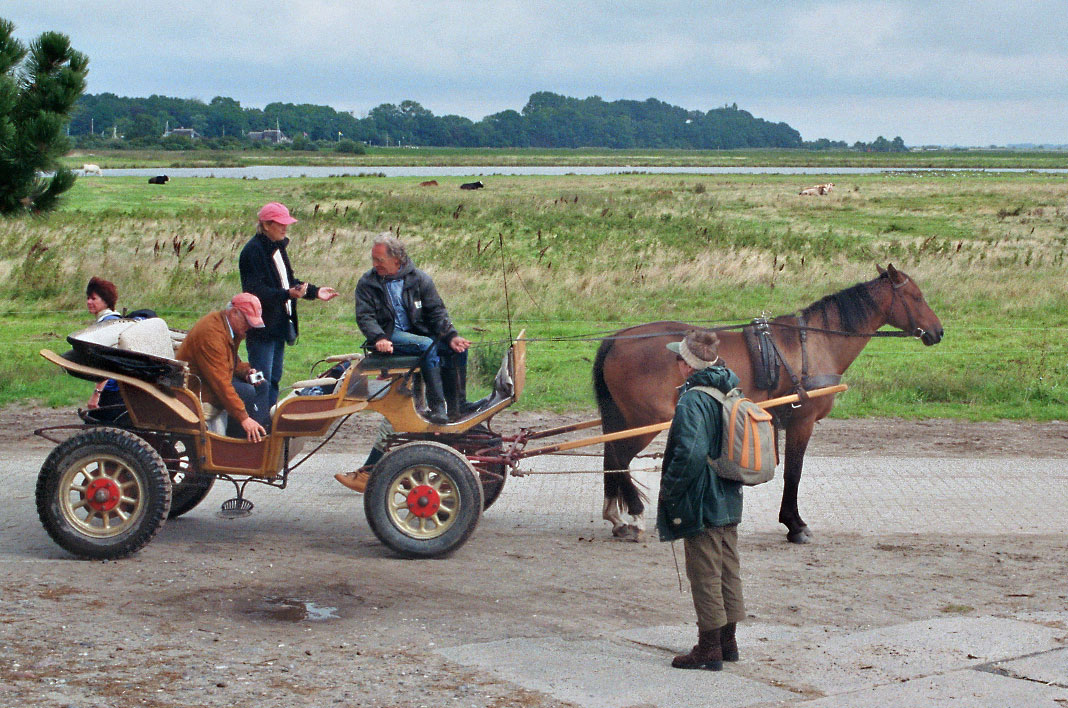
Passenger transport with a horse carriage.

Private motor vehicle traffic is prohibited on the entire island, which has been regulated by law since 1927. Some exceptions exist, recently increasingly with electric drive. Horse-drawn carts are used for passenger transport and some goods traffic. Between the northern and southern parts of the municipality, an electric regular bus operated by Rügener Personennahverkehrs GmbH (RPNV) runs Monday through Friday. However, the most frequently used means of transportation is the bicycle.

Unlike pedelecs/e-bikes, e-scooters on Hiddensee require a special permit, which is rarely issued, like all vehicles powered by engine power.

The island can be reached via several ship connections both from Stralsund (seasonally limited) and from Schaprode on Rügen, operated by the Weiße Flotte "Reederei Hiddensee". Here, the free transportation of severely disabled persons applies. In the summer season, there are further connections with Ralswiek, Breege, Wiek and Zingst. There are also water taxi connections with the mainland and the island of Rügen.

== Sights and museums ==
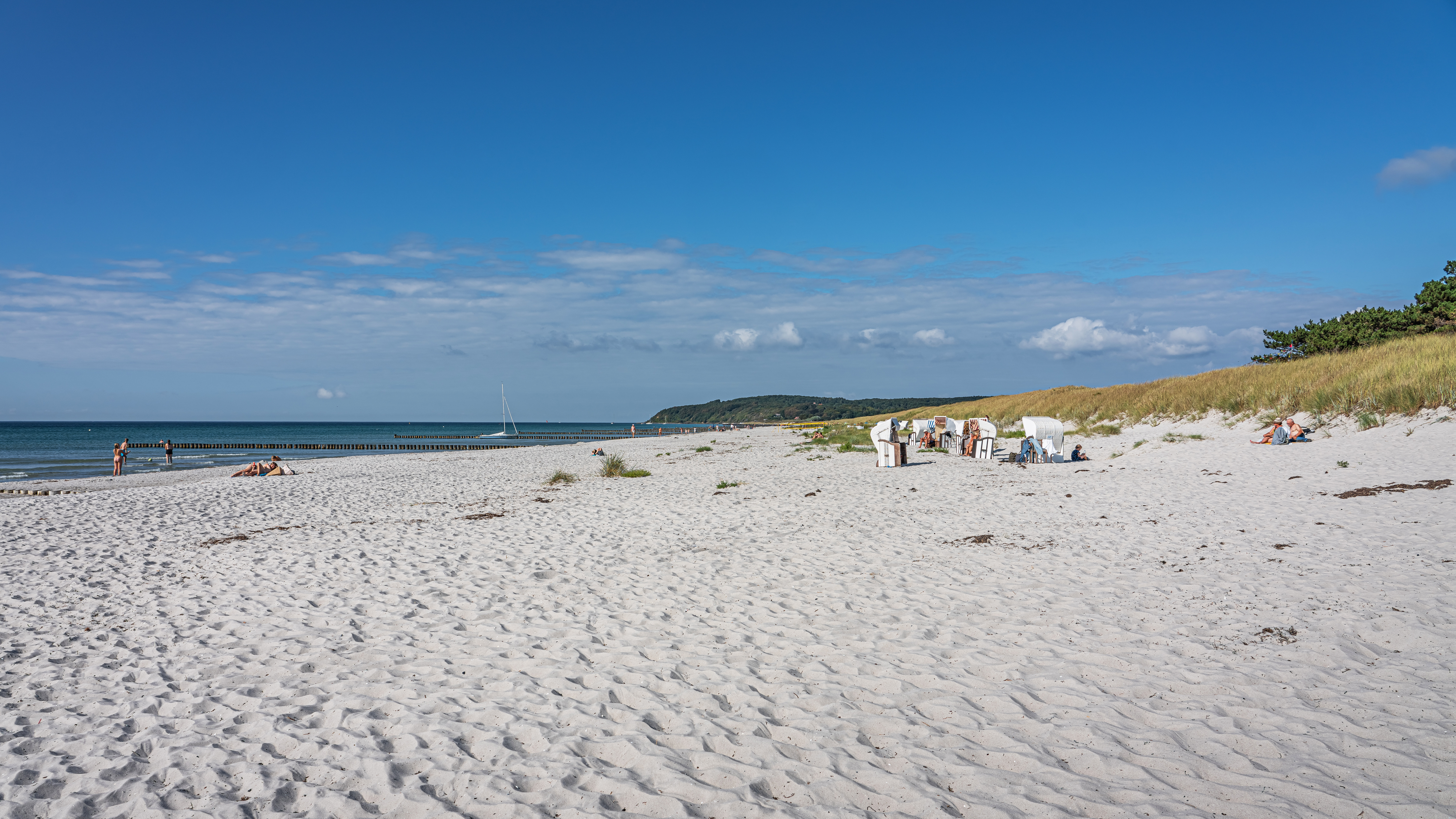
Hiddensee beach near Vitte

The "biggest" attraction on Hiddensee is the long sandy beach. It stretches practically the entire length of the island on the west side. Therefore, it has been known as a bathing resort since the late 19th century. Yet bathing attire (and also clothing etiquette in general) was very permissive even in the days of the Belle Époque. Ladies going barefoot and showing bare calves was possible everywhere on Hiddensee, where elsewhere it would have caused a scandal. In the interwar period, the island became a center of the Lebensreform and Naturism. In GDR times, due to complaints from indignant tourists, an attempt was made at times to ban skinny-dip, but this was hardly noticed. Today, there is no division into textile and nude beach sections on Hiddensee, and both are permitted and common throughout the beach.

=== Kloster ===
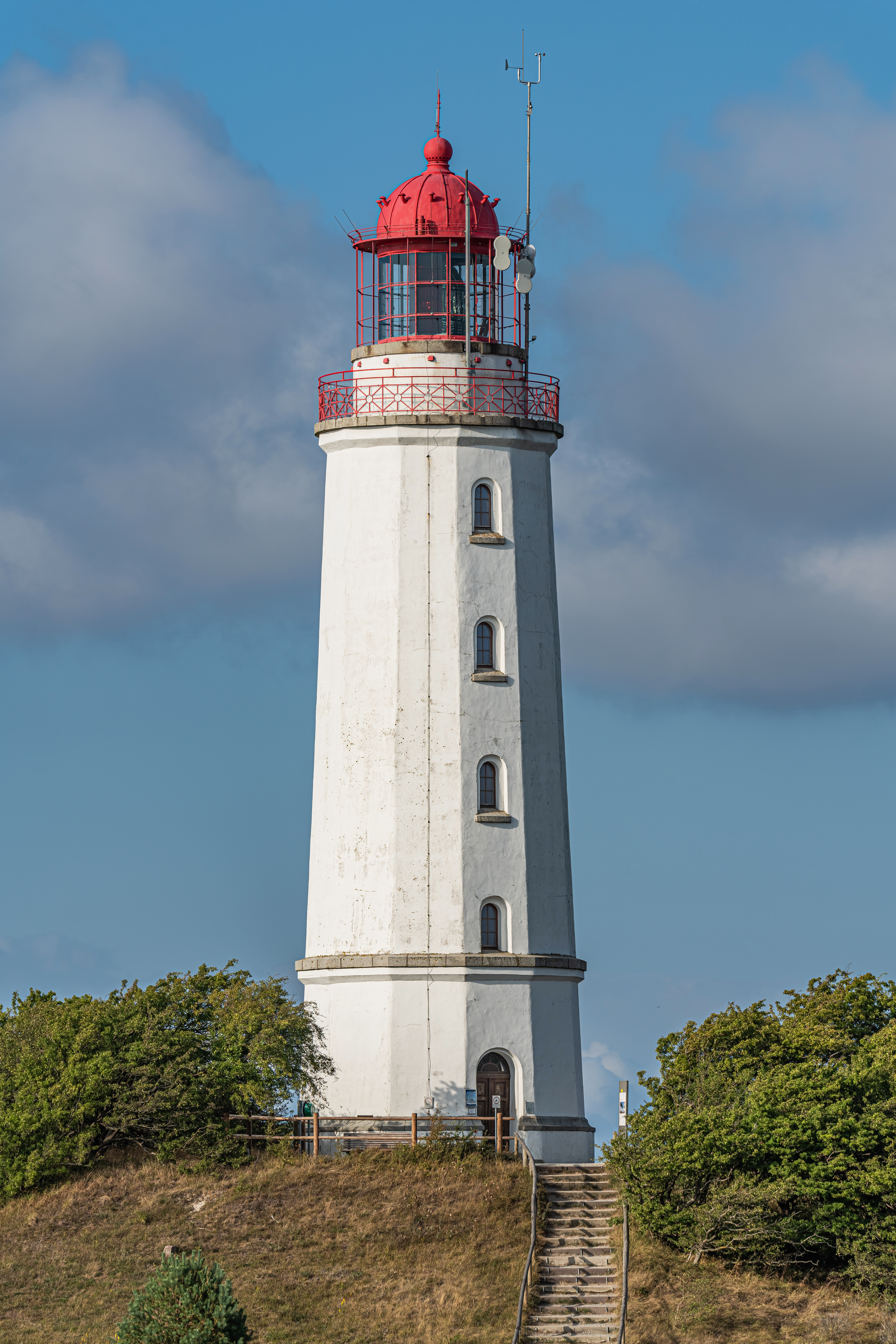
Lighthouse on the Dornbush

==== Dornbusch lighthouse ====
In the north of the island, on the Schluckswiek in the so-called highlands of Hiddensee, stands the landmark of the island, the Hiddensee Lighthouse. 102 steps lead up to the tower, which has been open to visitors since 1994. However, so that it doesn't get too crowded up there, only 15 visitors can climb the tower at a time. From wind force 6, the tower remains closed for safety reasons.

==== Gerhart Hauptmann House ====
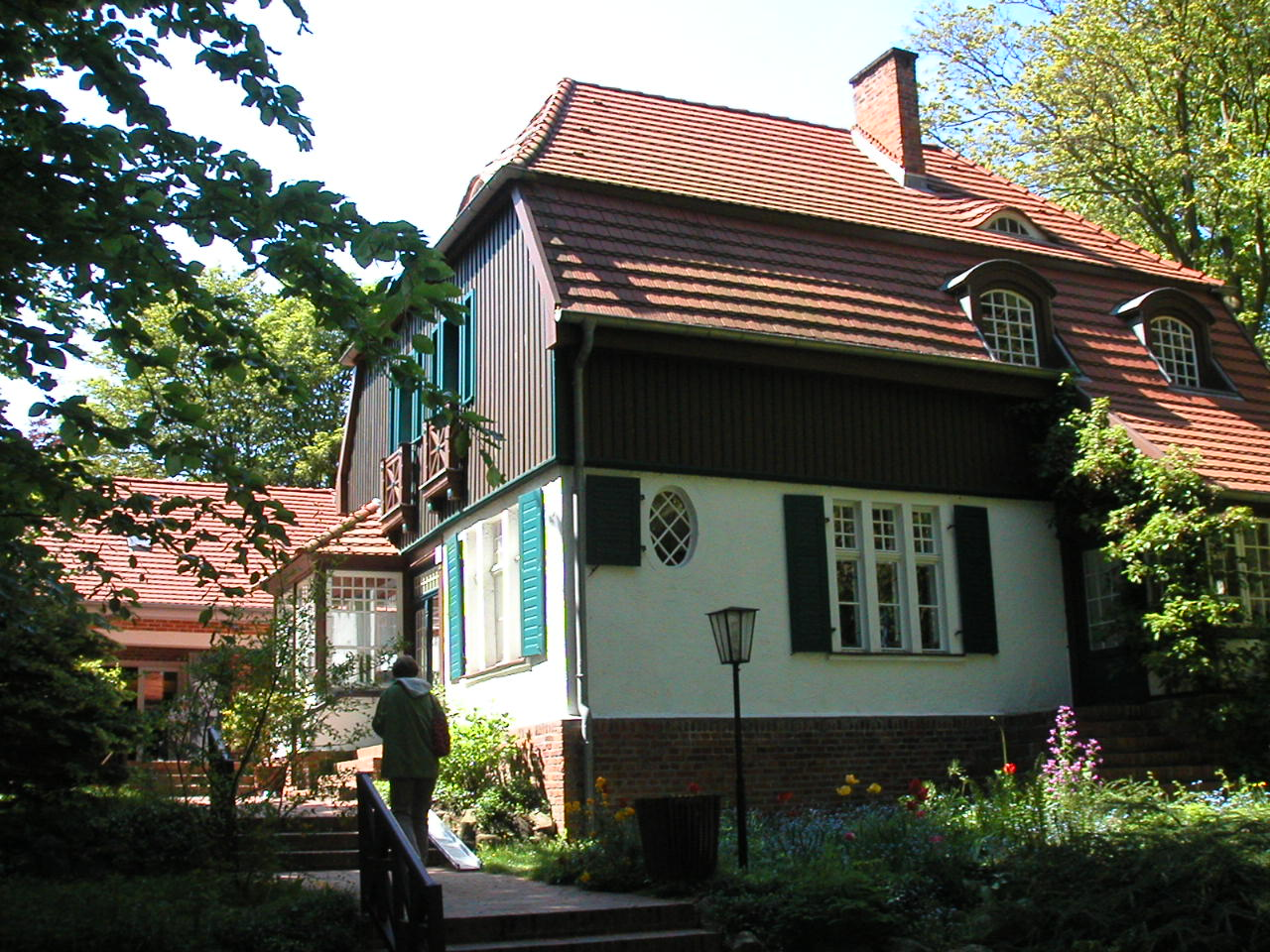
Gerhart Hauptmann Haus

In the former country house Modler and later house Seedorn the writer Gerhart Hauptmann was a summer guest already in 1926. Four years later he bought it from the municipality and added an annex. From 1930 to 1943 he spent the summer months here with his wife. In 1956, it became the Gerhart Hauptmann Museum, which also hosts readings and concerts. The literature pavilion, built in 2012 in a strikingly modern form on the property, serves as the entrance and houses the ticket office, museum store (bookstore) and a permanent exhibition Literaturlandschaft Hiddensee.

==== Hiddensee Island Church ====
Hiddensee Island Church was built in 1332 in front of the monastery, of which nothing is preserved today (the so-called Klostertor was built only after the monastery was abandoned). For centuries it served as a parish church for the inhabitants of the island. In 1781 it was rebuilt in the Baroque style - the pulpit altar, confessional, baptismal angel and baptismal font date from this period. The painted barrel vault, the so-called Hiddenseer Rosenhimmel, however, is only from 1922. Today, the island church is the seat of the Protestant parish of Hiddensee.

==== Lietzenburg ====
The Lietzenburg is a listed Art Nouveau villa built by the painter Oskar Kruse in 1904/1905. It is a brick building with natural stone foundation on a hill near the Dornbusch. For many years it has served as a boarding house for artists.

==== Museum of local history Hiddensee ====
The museum of local history Hiddensee is a simple plaster building in Kloster. It offers a permanent exhibition on the island's history with about 450 exhibits, a complete copy of Hiddensee treasure found on the island, files, about 2500 photographs, postcards and slides, and an extensive library. Some works by well-known representatives of the Hiddensee artists' colony are also in the museum's collection. The building itself dates back to 1890 and was a sea rescue station.

==== Doktorandenhaus ====
Only a few steps away from the Gerhart Hauptmann Museum, at Biologenweg 5, stands the Doktorandenhaus, built in 1925 by Max Taut for the Berlin publishing director Max Gehlen. In 1930, the island administration bought the building as a summer house for the Biological Station of Hiddensee. Since about 1990, it has served as a seminar and accommodation building for the University of Greifswald.

==== Eggert Gustavs Museum ====
In the settlement area Am Bau, the Alte Schmiede was converted into a museum and opened in 2019. It honors the life and work of the artist Eggert Gustavs, who died in 1996 and was the son of the island's long-time pastor Arnold Gustavs, and thus aims to make him known to wider circles.

=== Vitte ===
==== National Park House Hiddensee ====
The national park house was opened in 1998. The house in the north of Vitte is a thatched building with a trapezoidal ground plan. It contains a permanent exhibition about the Western Pomerania Lagoon Area National Park with a focus on Hiddensee. The exhibition's motto is "Panta Rhei – Alles fließt".

==== Asta Nielsen House and surroundings ====
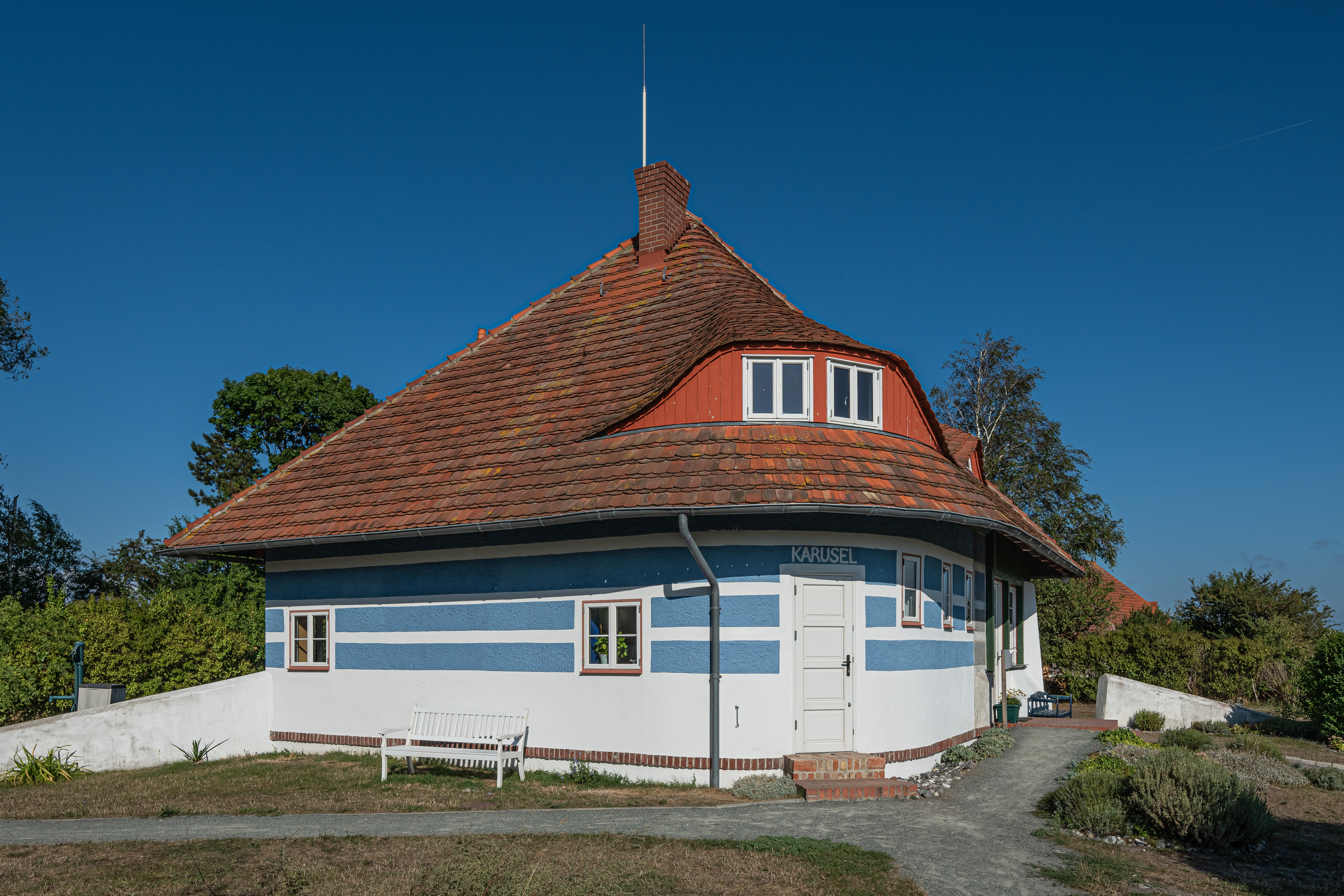
Asta Nielsens Haus Karusel

The round building, also called Karusel after the Danish word for carousel, was built in 1923 according to plans by Max Taut for the Müller family. In 1928, the daughter of silent film actress Asta Nielsen bought it and spent the summer months there with her mother and her husband until the 1930s. Frequent visitors were Joachim Ringelnatz with his wife, Heinrich George and Gerhart Hauptmann. In 1975, the local government listed the building under cultural heritage management; in 1989, the Nielsen heirs sold the house to the municipality. In 2015, a permanent exhibition about Asta Nielsen opened. The house was located directly on the Bodden until the 1960s (see History 1945 to 1989). Right next to the Asta Nielsen House is another building by Max Taut, built in 1924 for the commercial director Karl Weidermann.

The municipality uses the house for public events, but it was badly damaged in the meantime and had to be renovated. The Ministry of Agriculture of the state of Mecklenburg-Western Pomerania and the district of Western Pomerania provided around 500,000 euros for this purpose, and the municipality also had to make a small contribution. The renovation was completed in 2015, and since then wedding ceremonies can also be held in the balcony room. In addition, the house now serves as a museum and artists' residence, where, among other things, the cinematic work of the silent film actress and the life of Max Taut are shown in a permanent exhibition. Special exhibitions and seminars in adjoining rooms are added.

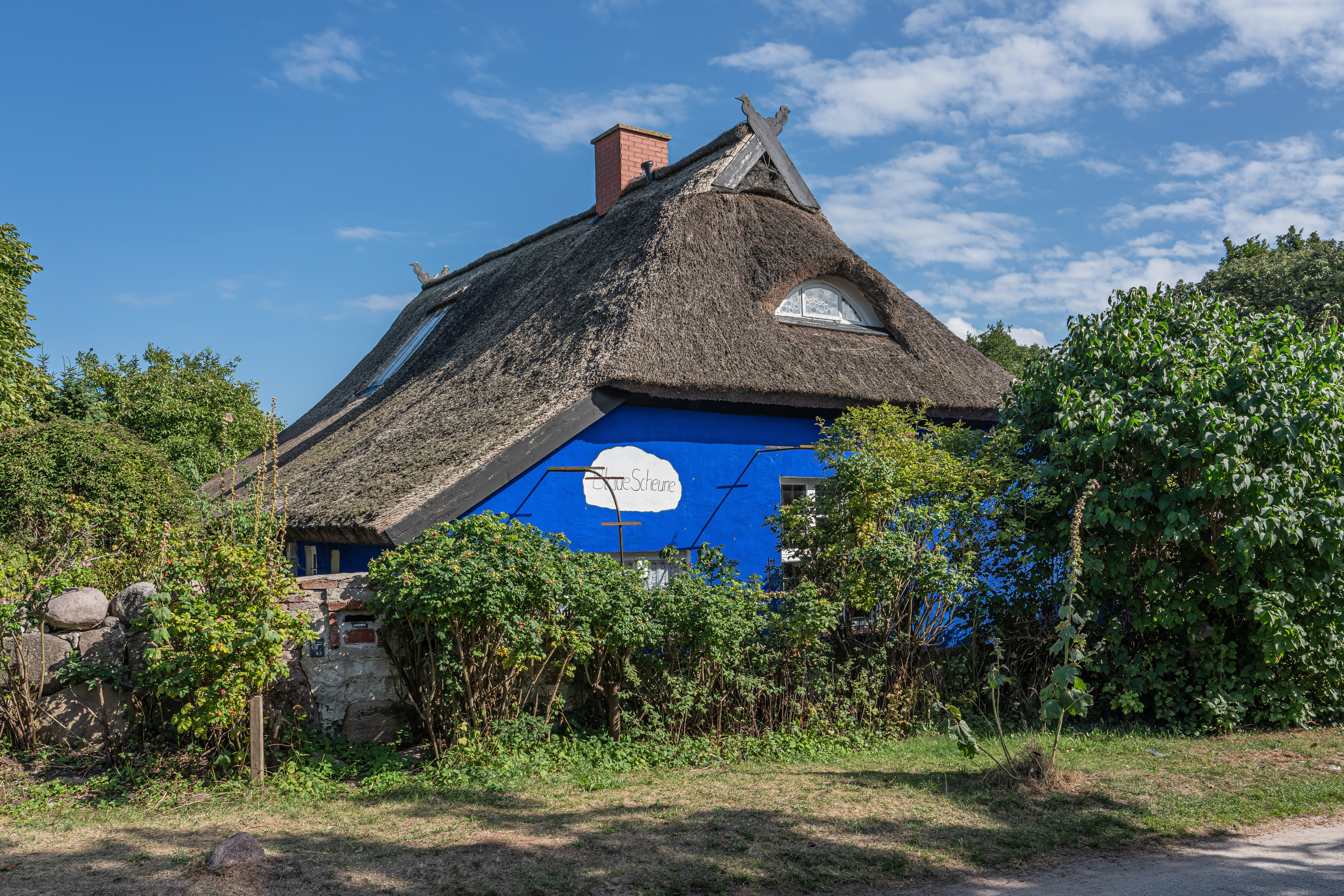
Blaue Scheune

==== Blaue Scheune ====
In its original layout, the Blaue Scheune is a Low German half-timbered house from the beginning of the 19th century. Since the 1970s it has housed the gallery of the owner Günter Fink. He exhibited his paintings with island motifs here and also sold them.

==== Henni Lehmann Haus ====
The Landhaus Lehmann was used as the summer residence of the Henni Lehmann family from 1907 to 1937. The building was designed by the Schwerin architect Paul Ehmig. After a reconstruction, the building served as the town hall of Vitte between 1938 and 1991. Since 5 June 2000 the house is officially called Henni Lehmann House and is used for events and exhibitions as well as the local library.

==== Hexenhaus ====
Built in 1755 as a fisherman's cottage, it is considered the oldest house in Vitte. Since 1915 the painter Elisabeth Büttner lived in the house, from 1930 it was the summer residence of the Pallat family or the resistance fighter Adolf Reichwein, who was murdered in 1944, and is still owned by the family today. In 1981, the house in Süderende 105 was listed as a historical monument. A commemorative stumbling stone is located in front of the house. The building cannot be visited inside.

==== Humunkulus figure collection ====
The collection of figures and props in the matter-of-fact new building made of larch wood comes mainly from the neighboring puppet theater Seebühne by Karl Huck. On display, in addition to theater posters and brochures, are, for example, Doctor Faustus, Long John Silver, Ebenezer Scrooge, Hans Christian Andersen, Tolstoy, Kafka, Edgar Allan Poe, William Shakespeare, Goethe, Pinocchio, King Kong, Marilyn Monroe, Helena, and an extensive animal kingdom including a dronte chick.

=== Neuendorf ===
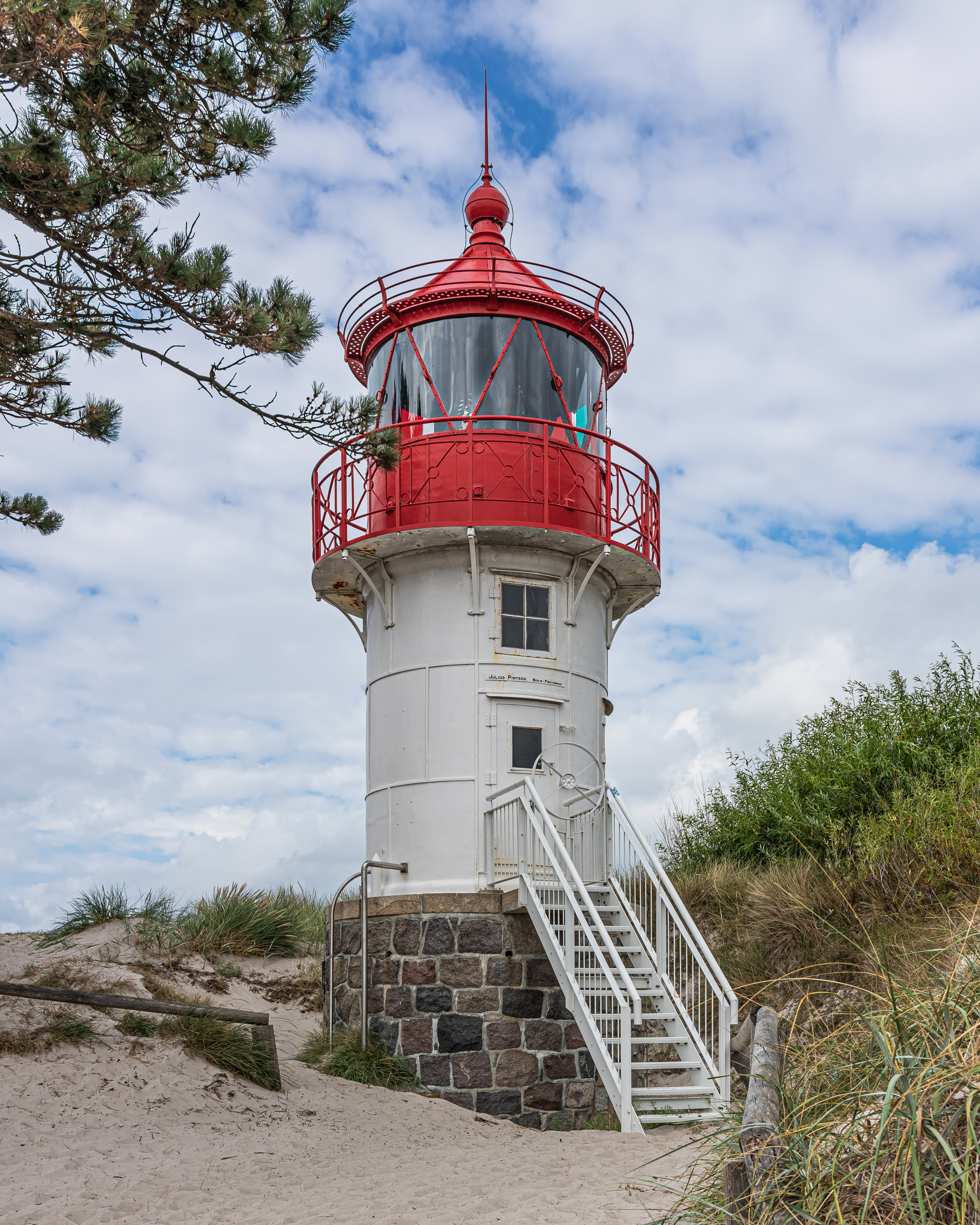
Beacon Gellen-Hiddensee

==== Gellen lighthouse ====
The 12.30 m high structure (height of fire 10 m), a sector and cross light, is located south of Neuendorf at the northern border of the Gellen. It has the lighthouse number C2586 and the coordinates ♁54° 30′ 29″ N, 13° 4′ 28″ E. The beacon bears the official designation "Leuchtfeuer Gellen/Hiddensee". The white steel tower with red gallery and conical roof stands on a natural stone base. It was built in 1904 by the company Julius Pintsch (Berlin) from cast segments (tubbings) and has been in trial operation since 1905, in continuous operation since 1907. The Ranzow and Kolliker Ort lighthouses (on the island of Rügen) and the Norddorf lighthouse (on the island of Amrum) were built in the same way at the same production plant (Fürstenwalde/Spree branch). The lighthouse Gellen/Hiddensee marks the northern entrance to the Gellenstrom, in the west the fairway of the Gellenstrom and leads in the east through the Schaproder Bodden. The lighthouse was depicted on a 5-million-mark emergency banknote issued by the district of Rügen in 1923. In the GDR's special stamp series "Leucht-, Leit- und Molenfeuer" from 1975, the Gellen beacon graced the 10 pfennig stamp as a motif.

==== Parish hall Uns Tauflucht ====
So that church services could also be celebrated in Neuendorf, the parish hall Uns Tauflucht (Our Refuge) was built at the end of the 20th century. In addition to ecumenical services, it is also used for community events such as lectures and concerts.

==== Fishery museum Lütt Partie ====
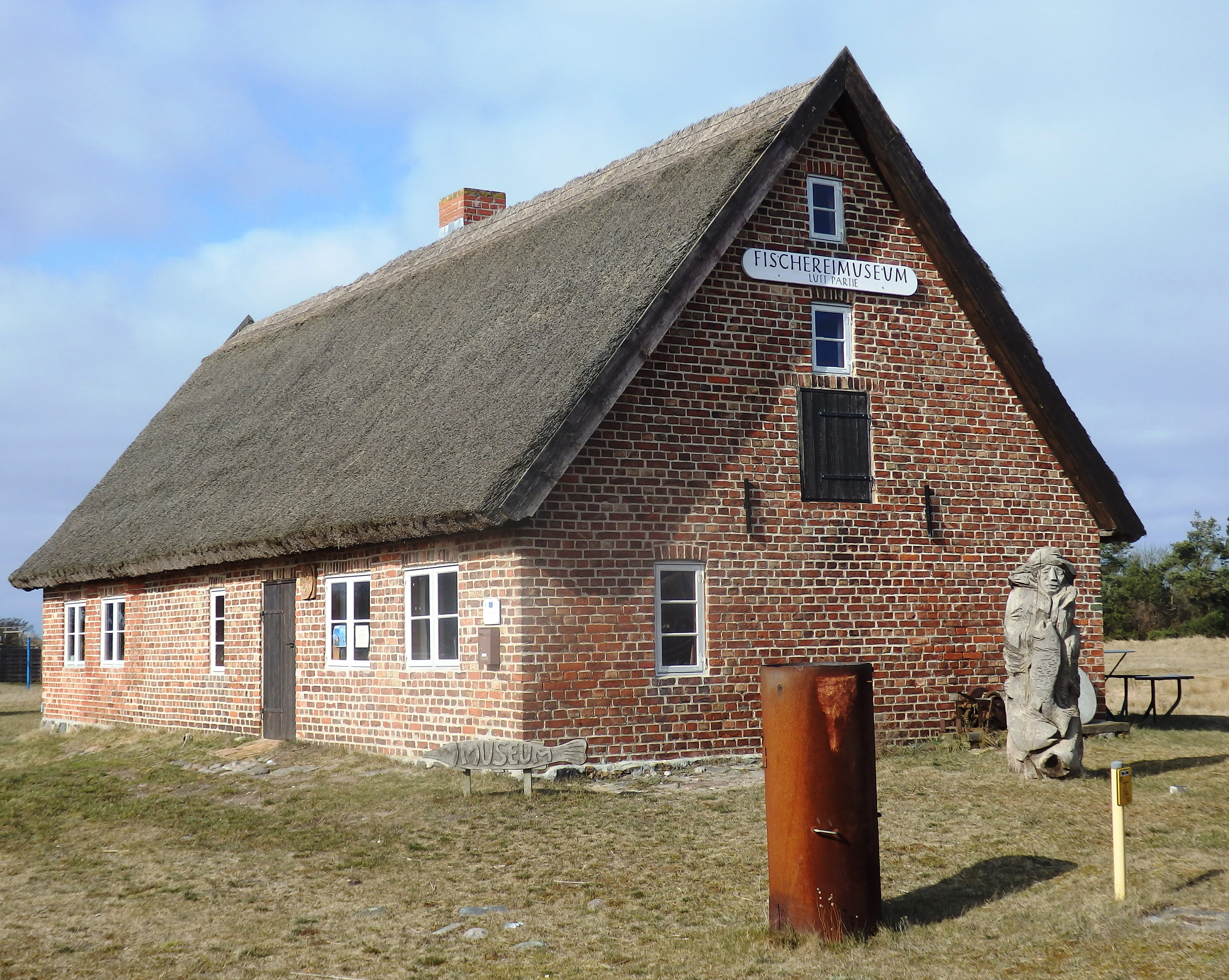
Fishing museum in Neuendorf (Hiddensee)

In 2006/2007, a brick-built former net and equipment shed from 1885 was converted into the Lütt Partie (Small Unit) Fishery Museum. The name is from times when it was still in its former purpose. At that time there was a large and a small net or equipment shed, one was popularly called Grod Partie, the smaller Lütt Partie. Since 2007, fishermen from the island have been presenting and explaining fishing equipment and telling stories about fishing history and everyday work in the past and present. The museum is run by the "Fischereipartie Neuendorf e. V." association, which is financed solely by donations.

== Stolpersteine ==
Six Stolpersteine in Vitte commemorate Henni Lehmann and four other painters of Jewish origin as well as the pedagogue and politician Adolf Reichwein, who became victims of the National Socialist regime.

== Culture ==
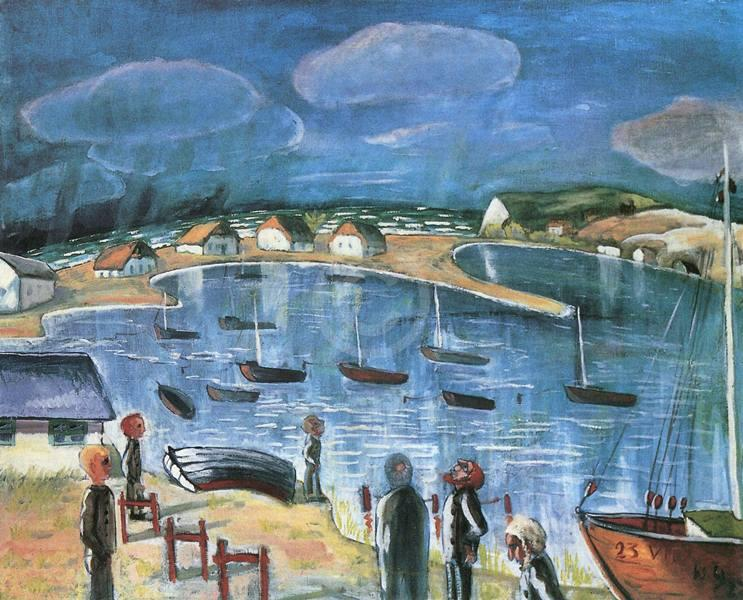
Hiddensoe by Walter Gramatté (1922)

The island of Hiddensee enjoyed the reputation of an artists' colony from the beginning of the 20th century. Artists of all kinds spent the summer months there and recorded their impressions in their work.

From 1904, the painter Elisabeth Büchsel spent the summer months in Neuendorf. In the same year, Oskar Kruse built his Lietzenburg in Kloster, which became an artists' meeting place. Later, his sister-in-law, the doll maker Käthe Kruse, also lived there. In the Blaue Scheune in Vitte, the summer residence of Henni Lehmann, the Hiddensoer Künstlerinnenbund met from 1922 to 1933. Other artists closely associated with Hiddensee from the period after the First World War are Willy Jaeckel and Joachim Ringelnatz.

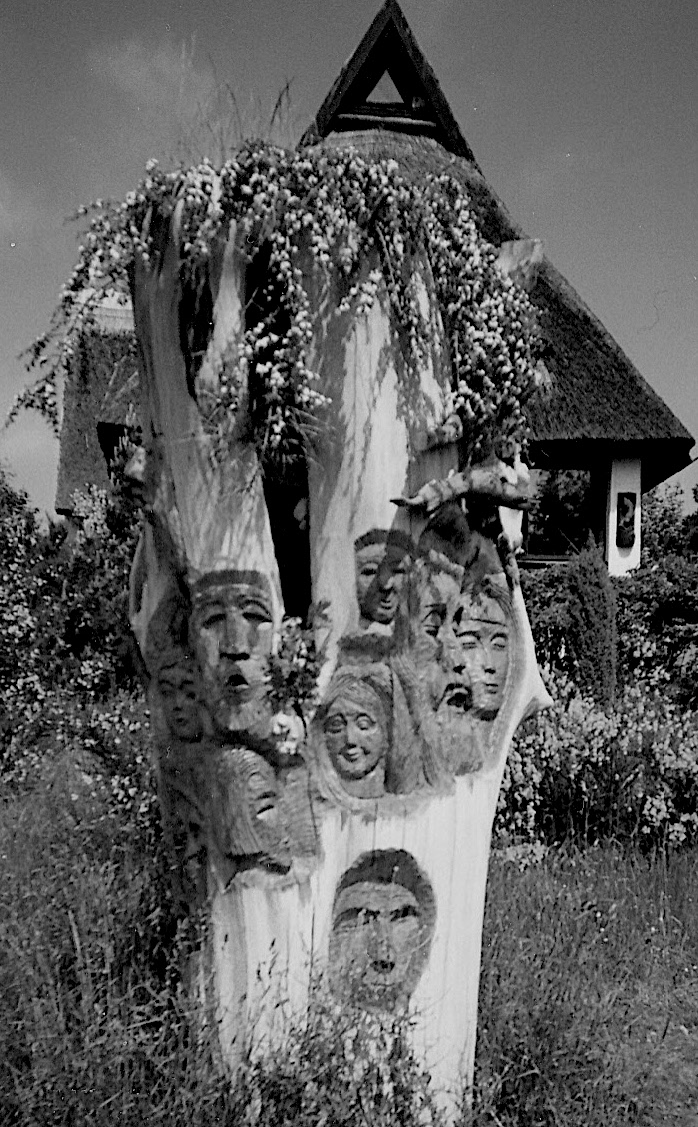
Gesichterbaum by Hanns Mehner

Even during the GDR era, numerous artists regularly stayed on Hiddensee and reflected on everyday life and the landscape in their paintings, prints and books, such as the writer Hanns Cibulka. The dancer and dance teacher Gret Palucca spent every summer on Hiddensee from 1948, was given a plot of land in Vitte by the GDR, on which she had a house built in 1961, which was demolished by an investor in 2009. Palucca was buried in the island cemetery in Kloster, where also lies artistic director Walter Felsenstein, who had a house built opposite the Lietzenburg, where he spent the summer months.

Felsenstein's neighbor, the painter Willi Berger (1922–2018), lived on Hiddensee since 1955. His catalog raisonné includes more than 4200 paintings, most of them with Hiddensee or people on Hiddensee as a motif. He also restored paintings of the painter Elisabeth Büchsel, but from 1955 to 1979 he was a full-time ornithologist and conservator at the ornithological station of Hiddensee. In his home and studio Schwalbennest on the Hügelweg in Kloster, a memorial exhibition was held in October 2019. Whether this will become a permanent exhibition is still uncertain.

Since 1987, the painter Torsten Schlüter celebrates his Hiddenseer Sommerausstellungen im Garten at various locations on the island such as the Schliekerschen Haus in Kloster. Currently, he owns an exhibition space in the former arts and crafts store of Irene Hasenberg at the Hotel Dornbusch. The exhibition is held in the garden.

Traditionally, a lot of carving art is made from driftwood and other dead wood on Hiddensee. In the 1970s and 1980s, mainly by the Schierk musician and artist Hanns Mehner (1927–2005), who at that time spent the summer months at his mother-in-law's house in Kloster. Mehner's owls, totem poles, and faces adorned the front gardens of Kloster (some to this day). After the fall of the Berlin Wall, Jo. Harbort continued this tradition. His wooden sculptures are placed among others at the playgrounds in Vitte and Neuendorf, at the harbors in Kloster and Neuendorf, at the church in Kloster and at the Inselblick. Together with the innkeepers Zum Klausner, he opened a sculpture park at the inn in 2005, which was created by students of the Theater Sculpture class at the Dresden Academy of Fine Arts and is expanded annually by new works of the respective class. Harbort's sculptures are also displayed at the island view.

Furthermore, there is a tent cinema at the harbor of Vitte and the puppet theater Seebühne in Vitte as well as the galleries Am Seglerhafen in Vitte, Am Torbogen, Galerie am Hügel and Hedins Oe in Kloster.

== Gallery ==
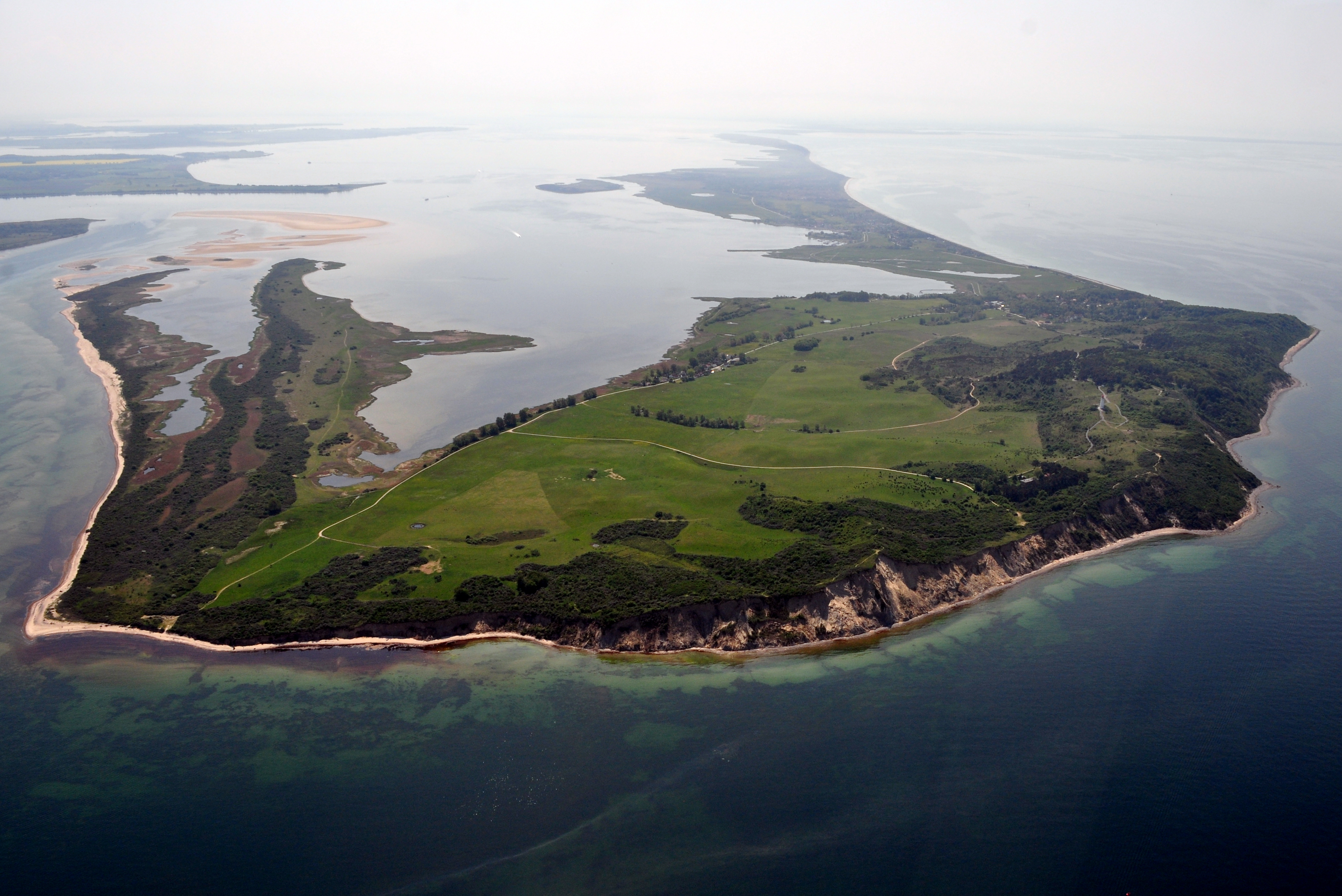
Aerial view of the cliff coast at Dornbusch, the northern tip of the Hiddensee island

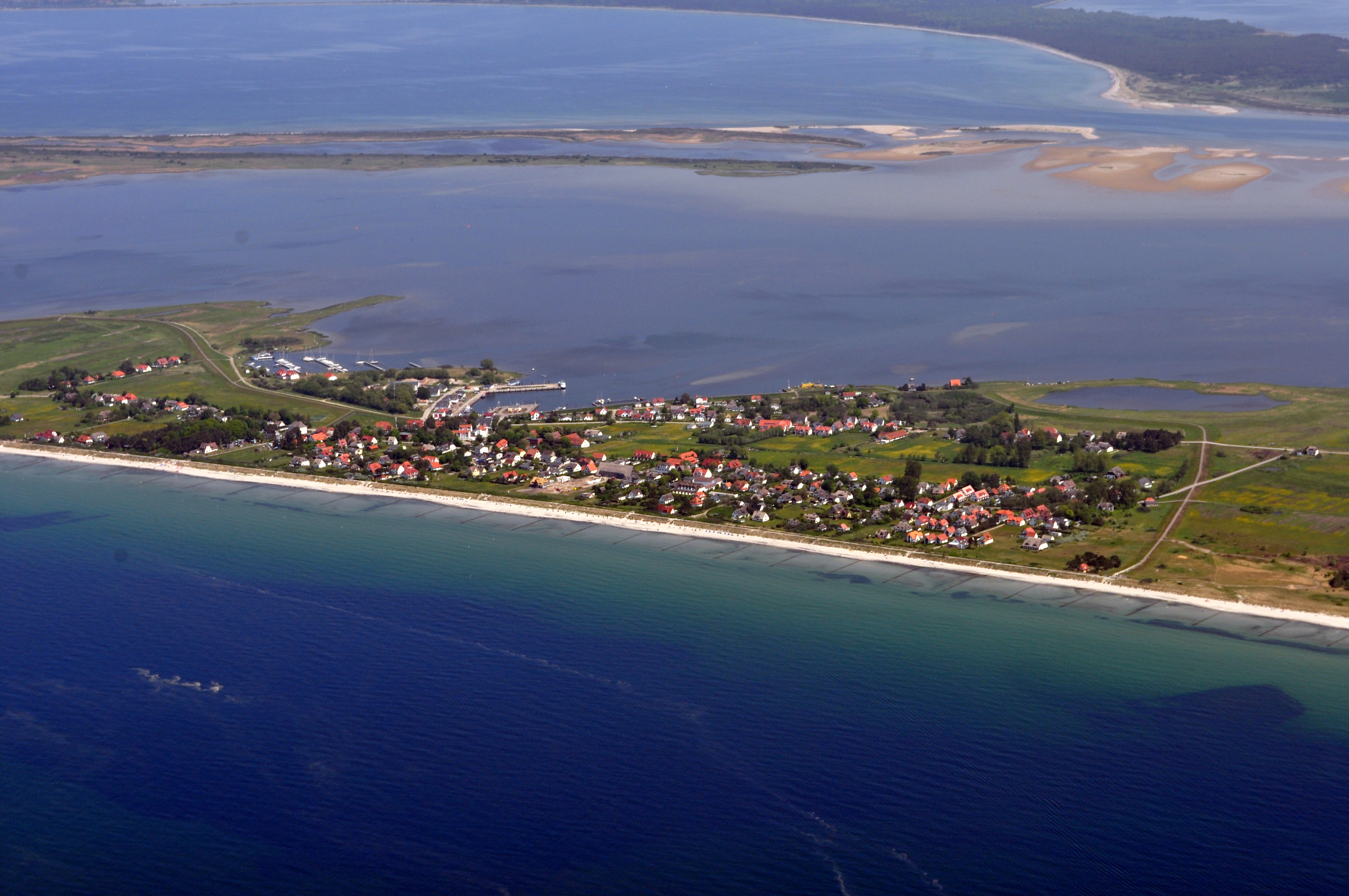
Aerial view of Hiddensee

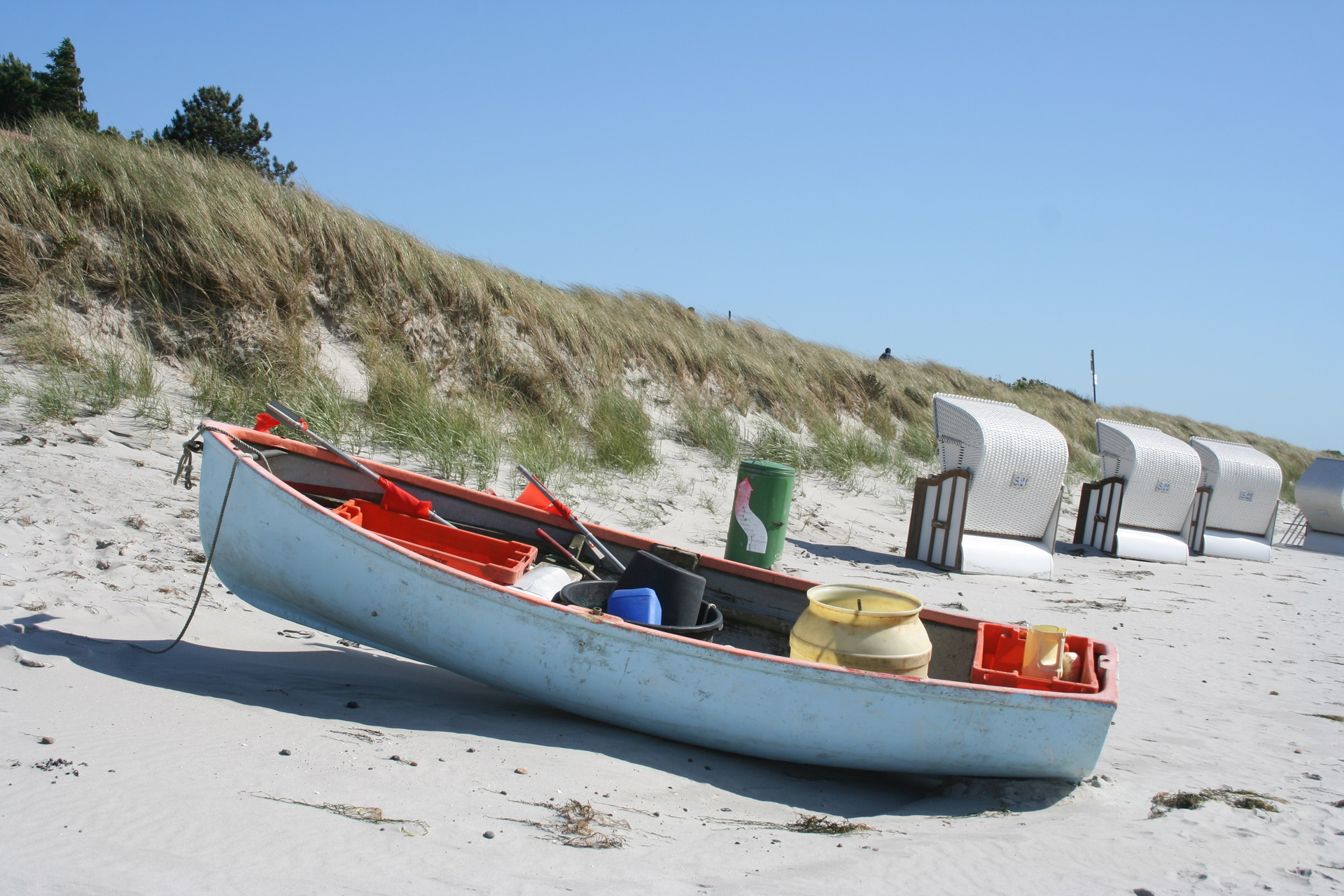
Fishing boat on a Hiddensee beach

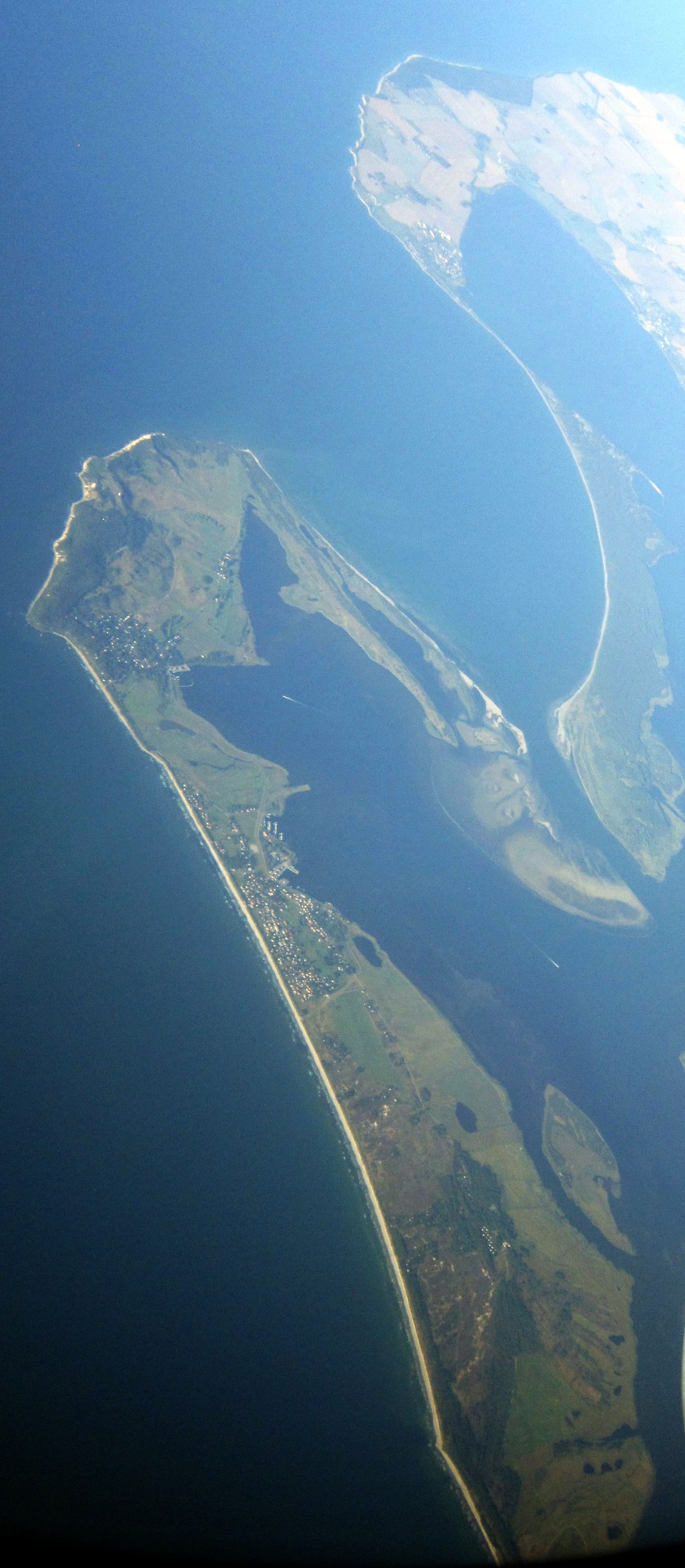
Aerial view of Hiddensee and Bug

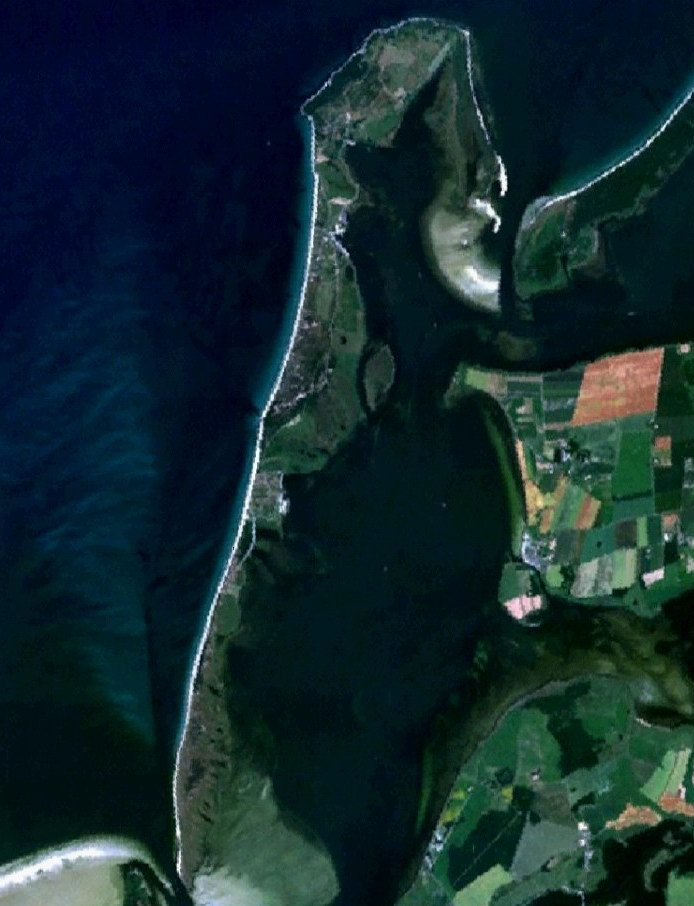
Satellite image of Hiddensee

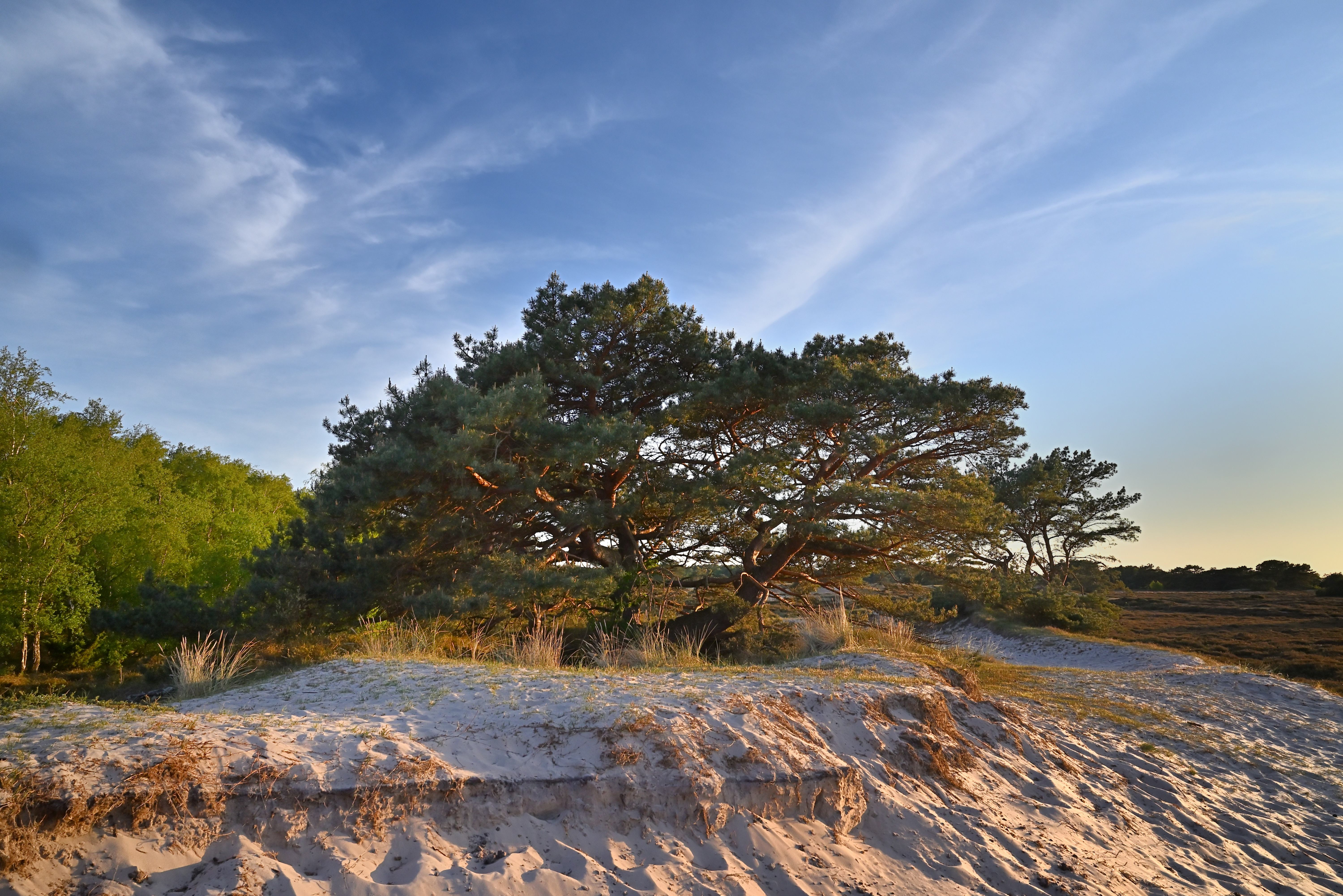
Pine trees in the Nature Reserve Dünenheide

== Others ==
The island of Hiddensee is also called "Sötes Länneken", sweet little land, by the locals.

Because many members of Berlin's bohemian scene spent their summer holidays on Hiddensee during the Weimar period, the island in the capital was also known as the Romanisches Café among the Baltic islands.

In 1974, Nina Hagen released the hit Du hast den Farbfilm vergessen, which says: "Hoch stand der Sanddorn am Strand von Hiddensee ...". The folk duo De Plattfööt also sang about "Hiddensee, Land zwischen Luv un Lee".

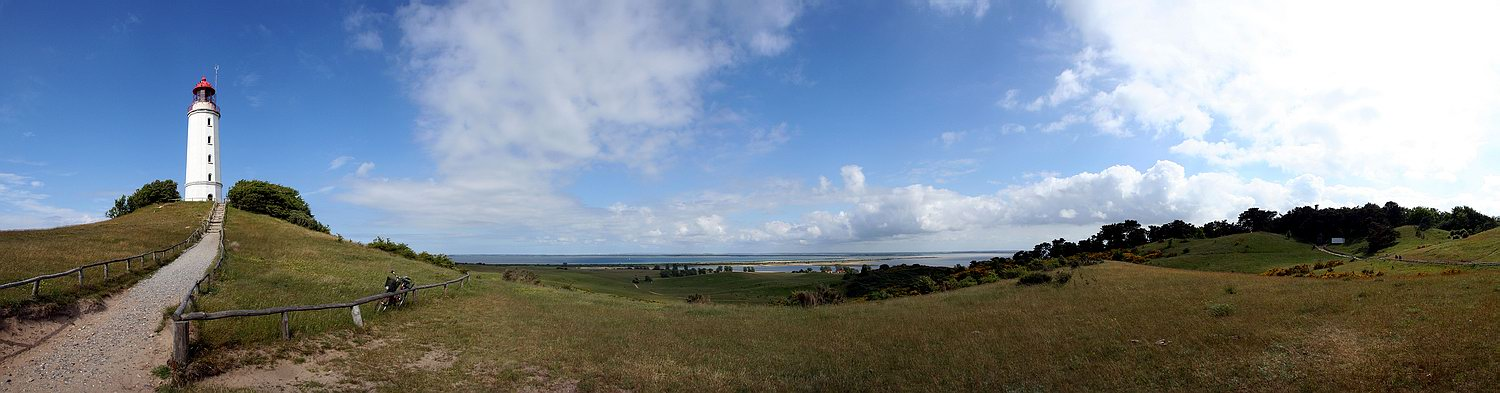
Panoramic view of lighthouse and Old and Newessin

A missile fast patrol boat of the German Navy of the Tarantul class bore the name Hiddensee from 1990 until its decommissioning in 1996. It is now a museum ship at the Battleship Cove naval museum in Massachusetts (USA) and can be visited.

The German Maritime Search and Rescue Service (DGzRS) owns and operates a rescue station with a rescue boat in Vitte.

=== Culinary specialties ===
On the island grows sea buckthorn in large quantities. Its fruits are processed into alcoholic (sea buckthorn liqueur and sea buckthorn spirit) and non-alcoholic beverages (cold and hot sea buckthorn juice), vitamin-rich dishes (sea buckthorn cake and ice cream) and cosmetics, etc. In addition, the local products are dominated by fish, especially freshly caught and smoked. A speciality is the Hiddenseer Schmoraal, for which every old-established Hiddenseer family and every restaurant has its own recipe. Meanwhile, the Boddenzander has also proven its culinary quality. Little known, but all the more admired for its green bones, is the needlefish, which can be found on some menus.

=== House marks ===
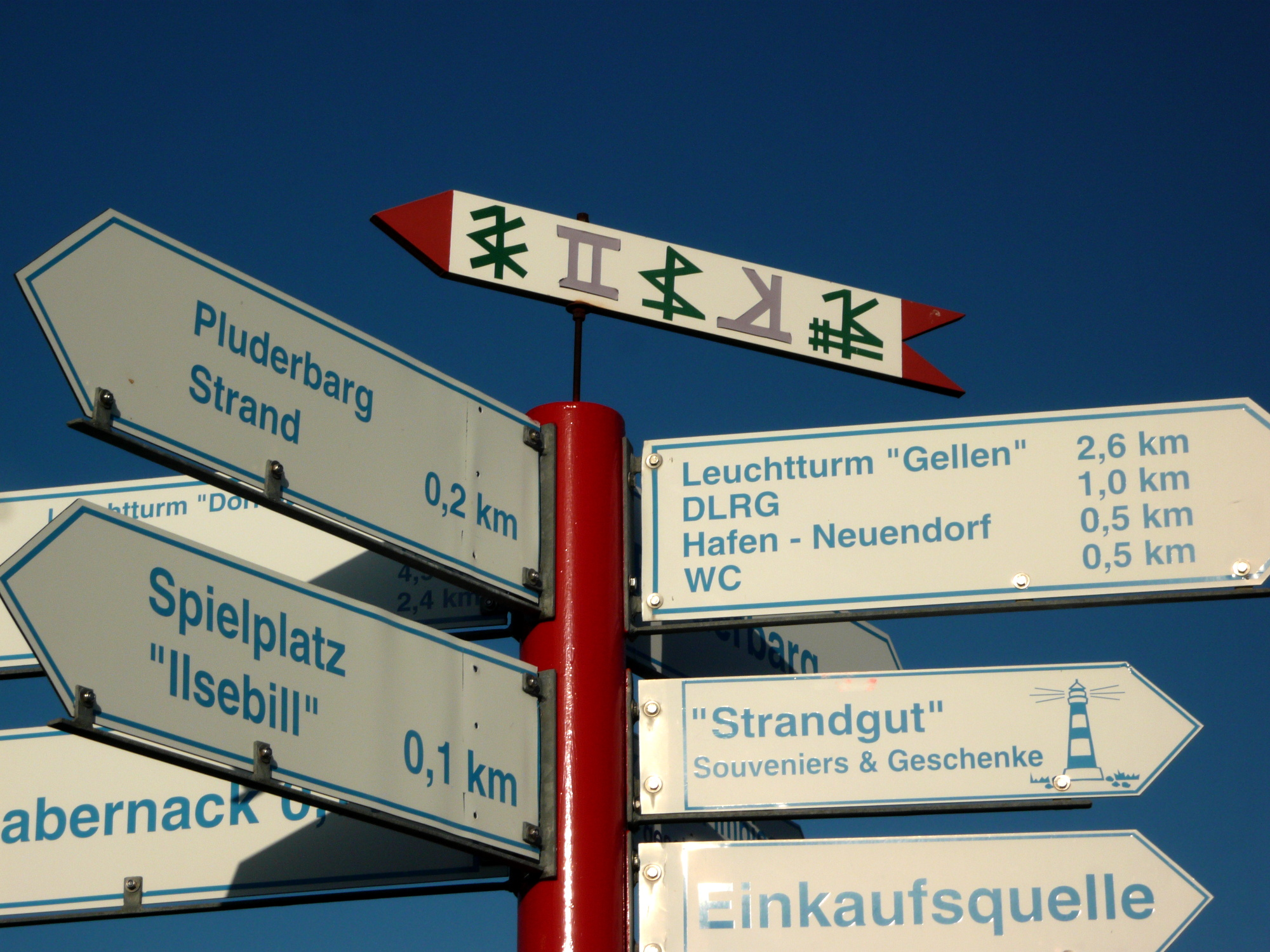
House marks on a signpost in Neuendorf

Many houses on Hiddensee still have their traditional house marks on them today.

== Films ==
The island has been the plot or location of numerous films:

- Das Mädchen von Fanö by Kurt Heuser based on the novel by Günter Weisenborn, music by Alois Melichar, directed by Hans Schweikart with Brigitte Horney, Joachim Gottschalk, Gustav Knuth, Paul Bildt a. o., 95 minutes, Bavaria-Film 1940/1941
- Der Augenzeuge 1946/14, DEFA-Wochenschau with footage of the transfer (Stralsund, town hall, harbor, steamship) and burial of Gerhart Hauptmann's mortal remains in Kloster
- Der Augenzeuge 1947/61, DEFA-Wochenschau with footage of the work of Hiddensee Fisher
- Vogelzugforschung auf Hiddensee mit Prof. Dr. Hans Schildmacher (1907–1976), Director: Manfred Ehrendt, Camera: Rudo Neubert, DEFA documentary, 1953
- Hiddensee, director: Jiří Jahn, camera: Heinz Thomas, composition: Hans-Hendrik Wehding, text: Erich Arendt, DEFA-Kulturfilm 1957, color, 15 minutes
- Der Augenzeuge 1959/B64, DEFA-Wochenschau, working people from VEB Simson Suhl fly from Erfurt to the Baltic Sea with Lufthansa to spend their vacation on Hiddensee.
- Gerhart Hauptmann zum 100. Geburtstag, camera and direction: Joop Huisken, composition: Gerhard Rosenfeld, narrator: Norbert Christian, DEFA documentary 1962, 17 min.
- Die Hochzeit von Länneken, Feature film, GDR 1963/64 (Director: Heiner Carow, Music: Günter Kochan).
- Lütt Matten und die weiße Muschel, children's film based on Benno Pludra, DEFA 1963/64 (director: Herrmann Zschoche, music: Georg Katzer).
- Schiffslacke unter der Wasserlinie, directed by Peter Ulbrich, about paints against barnacle growth etc., which are tested in a test station off Hiddensee. DEFA documentary 1964, color
- Der Augenzeuge 1968/23, DEFA-Wochenschau, Hiddensee awaits its vacation guests
- Der Augenzeuge 1970/34, DEFA-Wochenschau, workers from the Suhl vehicle and hunting weapons factory travel by Interflug charter plane via Erfurt-Barth to vacation bungalows on Hiddensee Heath.
- Den Wolken ein Stück näher, two-part television film based on Günter Görlich, directed by Christian Steinke, GDR television 1972/1973
- Polizeiruf 110: Kollision, by Claus-Ulrich Wiesner, directed by Manfred Mosblech, GDR television 1976/77
- Der Augenzeuge 1980/49, DEFA-Wochenschau, observations on Hiddensee in late autumn, a fisherman from Vitte talks about catching herring as well as advantages and disadvantages of each season
- Polizeiruf 110: Der Unfall by Eberhard Görner, directed by Manfred Mosblech, GDR television 1981/82
- Wanderungen durch die DDR – Hiddensee, television documentary by Werner Filmer and Dieter Storp, 45 minutes, WDR 1986
- Hiddensee – Insel der Berliner Bohème, television documentary by Dagmar Brendecke, 45 minutes, SFB/MDR 1993
- Hiddensee – Capri der Ostsee, television documentary by Frank Schleinstein, 29 minutes, Otonia/MDR 1994
- "Bilderbuch Deutschland" Hiddensee – Schönes Mecklenburg-Vorpommern, television documentary by Karin Reiss, BR/hr/ZDF 1998
- Karussell. Vier Tage auf Hiddensee. Reg. Jörg Mehrwald, DVD, Da Music/Deutsche Austrophon GmbH & Co. Kg/Diepholz

== See also ==
- List of islands of Germany
