= List of churches on Rügen =

On the German Baltic Sea island of Rügen there are 49 church buildings, of which 43 are Evangelical, three are New Apostolic and three are Roman Catholic churches. The Rügen Roman Catholic parish, the northernmost in the Archdiocese of Berlin, has its seat in St. Bonifatius in Bergen auf Rügen. The oldest churches on Rügen date from the 12th century. The most recent churches were built in the 20th century, in order to satisfy the growing demand of the seaside resorts.

== Overview map ==
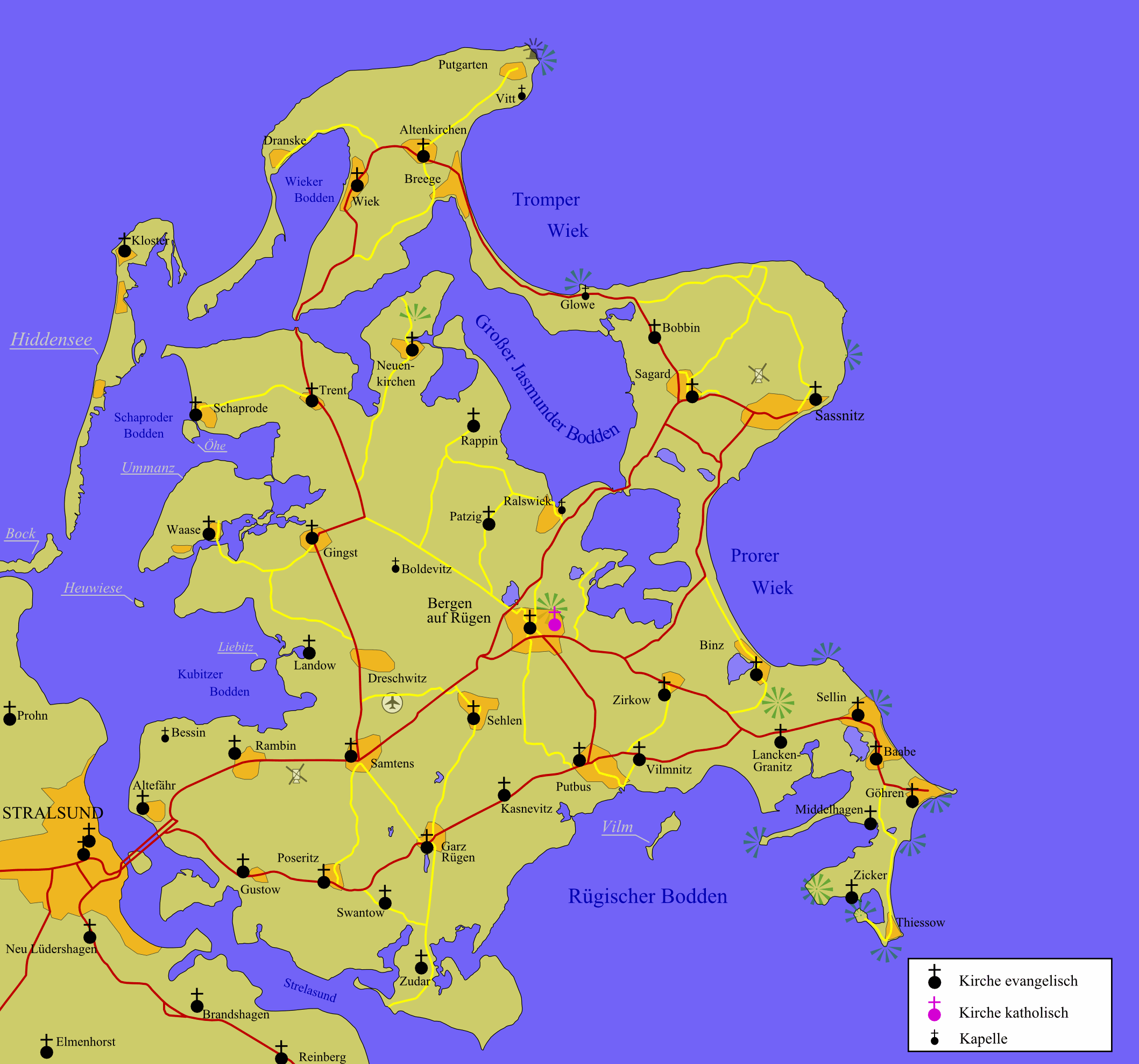
Churches on Rügen

== List of churches ==
In many cases it is difficult to give precise information about construction dates, because the churches were converted and extended. The overriding factor is the construction phase in which the building was given its present shape. Earliest recorded dates are usually just a terminus ante quem which only indicates the earliest date when the building must have existed, but not for how long up to that time. Sometimes it is also unclear whether a date refers to the current building or to a predecessor.

The churches marked in bold font in the table are the parish churches of their respective parishes.

Location	Parish	Church	Primary building period	Features	Image
Altefähr	Altefähr	**St. Nicholas' Church, Altefähr**	15th century	Valuable wall murals from the 15th century	
Altenkirchen	Altenkirchen	**Altenkirchen Parish Church**	1168	One of the oldest churches on the island	
Baabe	Sellin	Baabe Village Church	1929	One of the newest church buildings on Rügen	
Bergen auf Rügen	St. Boniface's, Bergen	**St. Bonifatius, Bergen**	1912	Roman Catholic Parish Church	
Bergen auf Rügen	Bergen	**St. Mary's Church, Bergen**	1193	One of the oldest churches on the island	
Bergen auf Rügen	Parish of Bergen auf Rügen			New Apostolic Church	
Bessin	Rambin	Bessin Chapel	1482	Chapel	
Binz	Binz	**Binz Village Church**	1913	Chapel, 1911–1913 built in the Neo-Gothic style	
Binz	St. Boniface's, Bergen	Stella Maris (Binz)	1925	Roman Catholic daughter church	
Binz	Parish of Binz auf Rügen		20th century	New Apostolic Church	
Bobbin	Altenkirchen	St. Paul's Church, Bobbin	1400	Pilgrimage church	
Boldevitz	Bergen	Castle Chapel, Boldevitz	1839	Classicist chapel (1839) in which wedding are held.	
Garz/Rügen	Garz	**St. Peter's Church, Garz**	1400	Granite font probably older than the church	
Garz/Rügen	St. Boniface's, Bergen	Church of the Sacred Heart, Garz	1913	Roman Catholic daughter church	
Gingst	Gingst	**St. James' Church, Gingst**	14th century	Baroque organ	
Glowe	Altenkirchen	Glowe Chapel	1982	Built in the style of a Finnhütte	
Göhren	Groß Zicker	Göhren Village Church	1930		
Groß Zicker	Groß Zicker	**Groß Zicker Village Church**	1400	Oldest building on the Mönchgut	
Gustow	Poseritz	Gustow Village Church	13th century	Carved figures from the 15th century	
Kasnevitz	Putbus	St. James' Church, Kasnevitz	2nd half of the 14th century		
Lancken-Granitz	Sellin	Lancken-Granitz Village Church	15th century	Ceiling paintings from the 15th century	
Landow	Rambin	Landow Village Church	1312	Probably the oldest timber-framed church in Central Europe	
Middelhagen	Groß Zicker	St. Catherine's Church, Middelhagen	1455		
Neuenkirchen	Neuenkirchen	**Church of Mary Magdalene, Neuenkirchen**	14th/15th century	Bell from 1367	
Patzig	Schaprode	St. Margaret's Church, Patzig	1500	Gothic hall church, baptismal font of granite made around 1250	
Poseritz	Poseritz	**St. Mary's Church, Poseritz**	1325	Medieval altar with crucifixion group	
Putbus	Putbus	**Putbus Castle Church**	1845	Late Classicist church with basilica cross-section	
Ralswiek	Bergen	Ralswiek Wooden Church	1907	Swedish wooden church, first sited in Stockholm	
Rambin	Rambin	**St. John's Church, Rambin**	1300	Baptismal font from the 13th century, one of the oldest churches on the island	
Rappin	Neuenkirchen	St. Andrew's Church, Rappin	1305	Font basin from the second half of the 13th century	
Sagard	Sassnitz	St. Michael's Church, Sagard	1210	Second oldest and largest baroque organ on Rügen	
Samtens	Rambin	Samtens Church	15th century	Brick church, interior converted to the baroque style	
Sassnitz	Sassnitz	**St. John's Church, Sassnitz**	1883	Asymmetric, Neo-Gothic church	
Sassnitz	Parish of Sassnitz auf Rügen			New Apostolic Church	
Schaprode	Schaprode	**St. John's Church, Schaprode**	15th century	Pilgrimage church, predecessor dates to the 12th century	
Sehlen	Garz	Dankeskirche (Sehlen)	1866		
Sellin	Sellin	**Church of Grace, Sellin**	1912	Grüneberg organ	
Sellin	St. Boniface's, Bergen	Maria Meeresstern (Sellin)	1912	Roman Catholic daughter church	
Swantow	Poseritz	St. Stephen's Church, Swantow	15th century	Mixed design of fieldstone and brick	
Thiessow	Sellin	Jesu-Sieg-Kapelle			
Trent	Schaprode	St. Catherine's Church, Trent	15th century	Gothic, triple-aisled church with wooden, carved, baroque altar	
Vilmnitz	Putbus	Church of Mary Magdalene, Vilmnitz	13th century		
Vitt	Altenkirchen	Vitter Chapel	1816	Octagonal building	
Wiek	Wiek	**St. George of Wiek Parish Church**	15th century	Gothic brick church with wooden equestrian painting Ritter Georg zu Pferde (around 1500)	
Zirkow	Binz	St. John's Church, Zirkow	15th century	Brick church with pulpit altar, confessional boxes and baptismal angel from the first half of the 18th century	
Zudar	Garz	St. Laurence's Church, Zudar	1318	Pilgrimage church	

== Literature ==
- Tourismuszentrale Rügen (Herausgeber): Gotteshäuser: Dorf- und Stadtkirchen auf Rügen und in Stralsund, Bergen 2003
