= Kreis Putbus =

Kreis Putbus
East German administrative division	Rostock
County town	Putbus
Vehicle registration plate	A (Bezirk Rostock)
Kreis Putbus within Bezirk Rostock

Kreis Putbus (district of Putbus) was a Kreis on the island of Rügen in the district of Bezirk Rostock in East Germany from 1952 to 1955.

== History ==
After the end of the Second World War the shire county of Rügen (Landkreis Rügen), which covered the island of Rügen, came under the Soviet Zone of Occupation and was incorporated into the state of Mecklenburg. On 25 July 1952 there was a comprehensive land reform in East Germany, in which the states lost their importance and new provinces called Bezirke were formed. Out of the territory of the old county of Rügen the town new counties of Putbus and Bergen were formed.

Because the division of the island of Rügen into two counties soon proved pointless, the counties of Bergen and Putbus were reunited on 1 January 1956 into the county of Rügen.

== Transport ==
Kreis Putbus was joined to East Germany's network of trunk roads by the F96 from Saßnitz via Rambin to Berlin. A railway link to the mainland existed in the shape of the line from Saßnitz via Rambin to Stralsund. Rail services in the county were also served by the branch lines of Bergen & Lauterbach Mole, Lietzow & Binz and Altefähr & Göhren.

== Municipalities ==
Kreis Putbus covered the southern part of the island of Rügen including the peninsulas of Mönchgut and Zudar. The following subdivisions belonged to the district: the towns of Garz and Putbus and the municipalities of Alt Reddevitz, Altefähr, Altensien, Binz, Dreschvitz, Gager, Groß Schoritz, Gustow, Göhren, Jarkvitz, Karnitz, Kasnevitz, Lancken, Middelhagen, Neu Reddevitz, Baabe, Poseritz, Rambin, Samtens, Seedorf, Sehlen, Sellin, Swantow, Thießow, Zirkow and Zudar.
