= Kubitzer Bodden =

Bodden in Germany

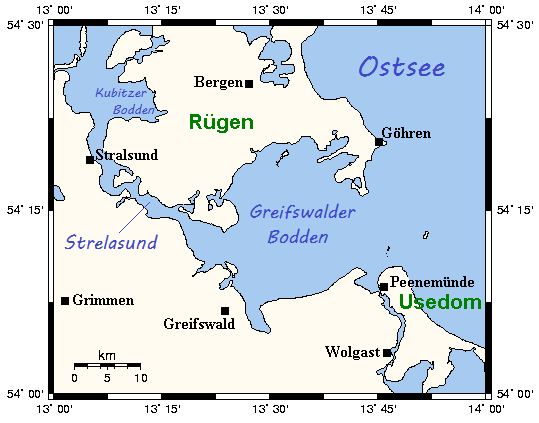
The Kubitzer Bodden

The Kubitzer Bodden is a type of lagoon known as a bodden on the Baltic Sea coast in the southwestern area of the island of Rügen in Germany. In the north the bodden is bounded by the Lieschow peninsula on Rügen. In the east and south the shores of the island of Rügen near Dreschvitz, Samtens and Rambin form its natural perimeter. The boundary with the Strelasund to the west is the line between the hook known as the Bessiner Haken near Bessin in the south and the tip of the Lieschow peninsula in the north.

The Kubitzer Bodden reaches its greatest depth in the area of the navigable channel off the village of Rugenhof where it is about 3.5 metres deep. In the central and western areas of the bodden the water depth varies between 2 and 3 metres. The zones near the shore are about 1.5 metres deep. The shipping channel, the so-called Schwarze Strom ("Black Stream") runs through the middle of the bodden in and east-west direction.

The bodden is named after the village of Groß Kubitz on the island of Rügen. The bodden is part of the Western Pomerania Lagoon Area National Park and it is one of the West Rügen Bodden.

On the Bessiner Haken there is a beacon.

In the east of the bodden lies the island of Liebitz.
