= List of heritage buildings in Dreschvitz =

This list of heritage buildings in Dreschvitz includes all historic buildings in the municipality of Dreschvitz and its incorporated villages. Dreschvitz lies in the county of Vorpommern-Rügen in northeast Germany.

== Dreschvitz ==
No.	Location	Official designation	Description	Image
1	Dorfstraße 2	Animal shed		
2	Gingster Chaussee 17	House		

== Güttin ==
No.	Location	Official designation	Description	Image
3	Güttin Manor	Manor house with stables, coach house, sheep stalls		
4	Güttin 64	Cottage (Katen)		

== Landow ==
No.	Location	Official designation	Description	Image
5	Landow Village Church	Village church of Landow and cemetery with row of chestnuts, cast-iron grave crosses and enclosing wall	The church was built around 1312. The interior was decorated in the baroque style in the 18th century.	
6	Landow 4b	House		

== Pagelsdorf ==
No.	Location	Official designation	Description	Image
7	Pagelsdorf 2	House		

== Ralow ==
No.	Location	Official designation	Description	Image
8	Ralow Manor	Manor house and park		

== Rugenhof ==
No.	Location	Official designation	Description	Image
9	Rugenhof 4/5	Fisherman's cottage (Fischerkaten)		

== Sources ==
- List of heritage buildings in the County of Vorpommern-Rügen
