= Garz Castle =

Burgwall fort

- Burgwall Garz
- Garz/Rügen
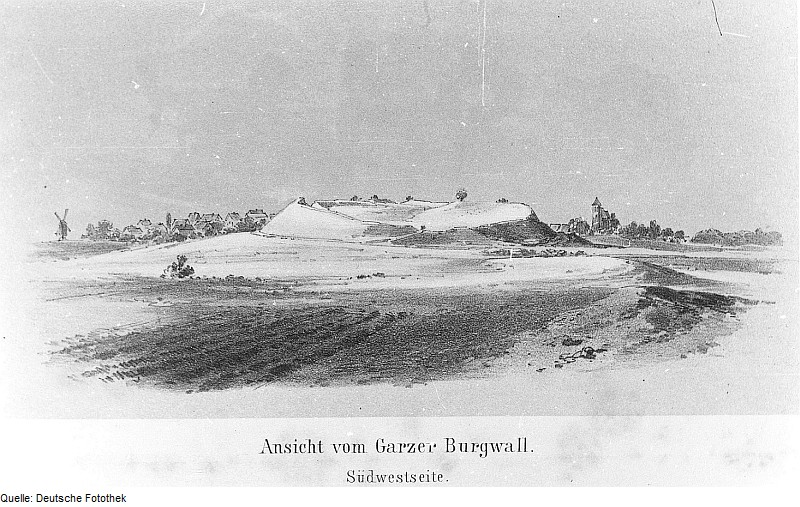

Site information
- Type: lowland castle
- Code: DE-MV
- Condition: ramparts

Location
- Coordinates: 54°18′50″N 13°20′49″E
- Height: 15 m above sea level (NN)

Site history
- Built: 8th to 9th century

Garz Castle is a Slavic fort, of the type known as a burgwall, located southwest of the town of Garz on the German Baltic Sea island of Rügen. The earthworks have an oval shape, are about 200 metres long and 140 metres wide. There is an entrance roughly in the middle of the western side. Towards the lake of Garzer See to the south (in the direction of Renz) the ramparts are lower. It lies up to 15 metres higher than the town of Garz.

== History ==
The castle was mentioned in 1165 as Borgar Gardz, when there were small-scale skirmishes with Danish warriors in front of the castle. The castle itself does not appear to have come under attack, but gradually fell into ruins afterwards. In 1300, the Prince of Rügen, Vitslav III, built a new castle and a chapel inside the original fort. After his death in 1325, the castle finally fell into disrepair. On the ramparts is now a war memorial to those who fell in the First World War and, in its immediate vicinity, is the Ernst Moritz Arndt Museum, where one can learn more about the history of the place.

== Today ==
The Garz fort is now a protected archaeological site. It ranks, in terms of size and degree of preservation, as one of the most important Slavic strongholds. Originally, it was confused with the castle of Charenza, which was reported in historical chronicles. However, recent interdisciplinary research in 2004 and 2005 has shown that the fort at Venz (between Gingst and Trent onat the Neuendorfer Wiek) is much more likely to be the prince's castle and temple of Charenza, which was surrendered without a fight on 16 June 1168 to the King of Denmark Valdemar I and his army commander, Absalon of Roskilde, after negotiations had been held. This was one day after the conquest of the Jaromarsburg castle and temple on Cape Arkona.
