= Prora station =

Railway station in Prora, Germany

Prora
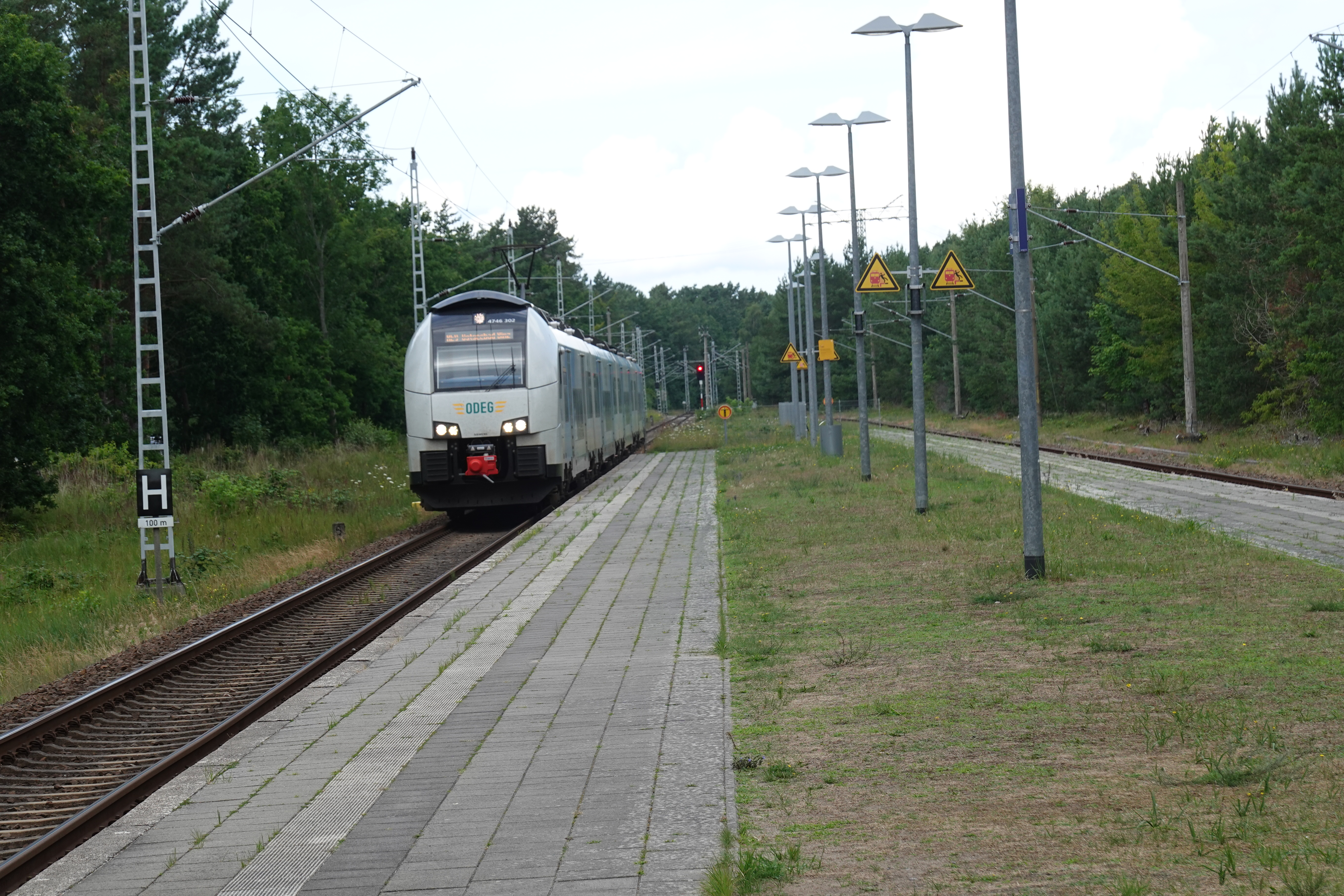
- ODEG at Prora station

General information
- Location: Prora, MV, Germany
- Coordinates: 54°26′38″N 13°33′53″E
- Owner: DB Netz
- Operator: DB Station&Service
- Line: Lietzow–Binz railway
- Platforms: 2
- Tracks: 2
- Train operators: ODEG
- Connections: RE 9

Other information
- Website: www.bahnhof.de

History
- Opened: 15 May 1939; 87 years ago
- Electrified: 27 May 1989; 37 years ago

Services
Preceding station	Ostdeutsche Eisenbahn	Following station
Lietzow (Rügen) towards Rostock Hbf	RE 9	Prora Ost towards Ostseebad Binz
Location

Prora (German: Bahnhof Prora) is a railway station in the town of Prora, Mecklenburg-Vorpommern, Germany. The station lies on the Lietzow-Binz railway. The train services are operated by Ostdeutsche Eisenbahn GmbH.

== Train services ==
The station is served by the following service(s):

- Regional services RE 9 Rostock - Velgast - Stralsund - Lietzow - Binz
