= Hermann Andreas Pistorius =

German Lutheran theologian and pastor

Hermann Andreas Pistorius (8 April 1730 – 10 November 1798) was a German Lutheran theologian, pastor, philosopher, reviewer, translator and writer. During his lifetime, he was regarded as "the most learned man on Rügen".

== Early life ==
Pistorius was born in Bergen auf Rügen. The son of a Bergen deacon, he lost his father at an early age. His stepfather, Brandanus Heinrich Gebhardi (1704–1784), promoted his scientific education.

He attended school in Bergen, the Stralsund Gymnasium and the Collegium Carolinum in Braunschweig. Afterwards, he studied at the universities of Greifswald and Göttingen. He then spent two years as a private scholar in Hamburg and Altona. During this time, he was engaged in the translation of works by David Hume. In Greifswald, he obtained a magister degree in 1756.

== Career ==
In 1757, he took over a position as Pastor substitutus in Schaprode. On 27 April 1759, he became pastor and provost in Poseritz. Pistorius spent most of his preaching career in Pöserzitz on Rügen. With the pastors Lorenz Stenzler and Joh. Eberhard Christian Krüger, he formed a learned circle, which had good contacts to Ernst Moritz Arndt. The University of Greifswald granted him the title of Doctor of Theology in 1790. In 1798, he died in Bergen from pneumonia at age 68.

In addition to his extensive theological knowledge, Pistorius possessed excellent knowledge of languages. He was particularly interested in philosophical studies and addressed, among other matters, topics of interest to the German and English philosophers of his time. He took a moderate Skeptical position. He was neither a supporter of Gottfried Wilhelm Leibniz, Christian Wolff, nor of Immanuel Kant. Following a visit to his brother-in-law Johann Joachim Spalding in Berlin in 1764 he became a member of the review journal Allgemeine deutsche Bibliothek. In 33 years he wrote more than a thousand reviews, mainly of philosophical, but also of theological publications. Almost all of Kant's works belonged to this group.

Known beyond the borders of Swedish Pomerania, Pistorius was mentioned in various descriptions of journeys to Rügen. His guests rarely judged him harshly, like Wilhelm von Humboldt, and mostly were enthusiastic like the Kosegarten pupil Karl Nernst or the Berlin Consistorial Councillor Johann Friedrich Zöllner.

== Personal life ==
Pistorius married Sophie Juliane Brunnemann, daughter of the Bergen provost Christian Anton Brunnemann (1716–1774). They had four children:

- Christian Pistorius (1765–1823), writer and translator
- Johann Philipp Pistorius (1767–1823), Pastor in Garz/Rügen, married to Charlotte Pistorius (1777–1850), poet
- Karl Ludwig Pistorius (1773–1844), 1798 lawyer at Wismarer Tribunal, 1801–1809 Mayor of Grimmen, 1810–1833 District Court Secretary in Loitz
- Heinrich Julius Pistorius (1781–1861), lawyer, mayor of Wolgast

== Works ==
- David Hume: Vermischte Schriften über die Handlung, die Manufacturen und über die andern Quellen des Reichthums und der Macht des Staates. Translation from English, Grund und Holle, Hamburg and Leipzig 1754.
- Joseph Priestley: Liturgie und Gebetsformeln zum öffentlichen Gottesdienst für Christen von allen Confessionen. Translation from English, Nicolai, Berlin 1786.
