= St. Bonifatius, Bergen =

Church in Bergen auf Rügen, Germany

Coordinates: 54°25′0″N 13°26′18″E

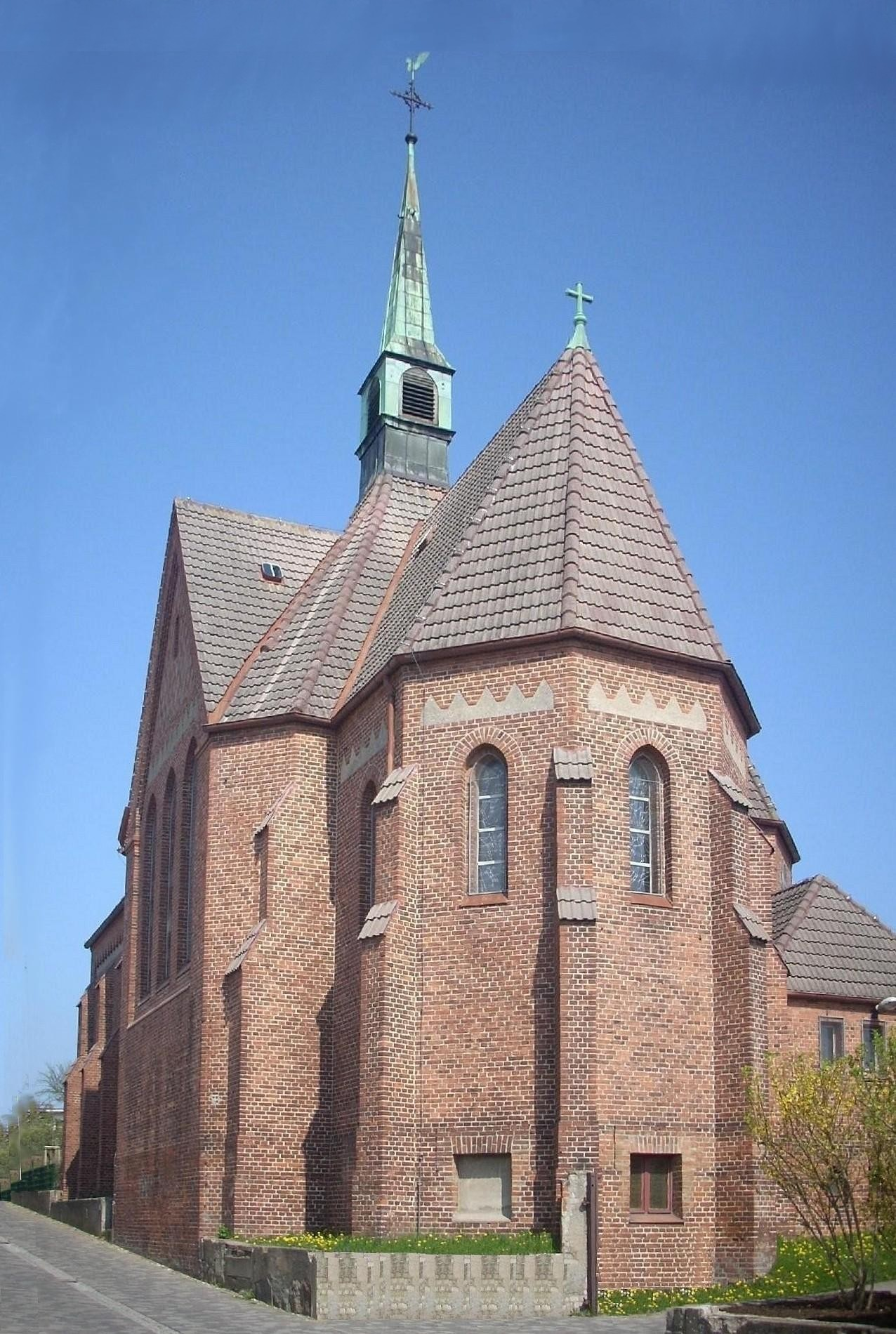
St. Boniface's Church

The Church of St. Bonifatius in Bergen auf Rügen is the seat of the only Roman Catholic parish on the German island of Rügen. Other churches in the parish are the Chapel of Stella Maris in Binz, the Church of the Sacred Heart, in Garz/Rügen and Stella Maris in Sellin. The parish is the northernmost in the Archdiocese of Berlin and has about 1,700 members.

== History ==
At the beginning of the 19th century, the Stralsund priest, Wendelin Zink, undertook the first pastoral trips to the island of Rügen and held services in the private homes of local Roman Catholics. In 1863, a mission house was established on the edge of the town of Bergen with a chapel consecrated on 8 September. Upon approval of the establishment of a mission parish in 1864 by the Prussian state, Gustav Machai became the first Roman Catholic priest on Rügen (until 1869). In addition to a vicarage, a Catholic school was also established from 1867 to 1878. In 1871, there were about 700 Catholics on Rügen.

On 1 July 1910, by which time the congregation had already outgrown the chapel, it was elevated to an independent parish. The then minister, Maximilian Kaller (officiated 1905-1917), collected donations for the new Gothic Revival building which was completed in 1912. Later Kaller built a daughter church in Garz. After his departure, he went to Berlin's St. Michael's Church.

In 2000, a new single-division organ with Neo-Gothic casing was installed in the church.

== See also ==
- List of churches on Rügen
