= Prora Ost station =

Railway station in Prora, Germany

Prora Ost
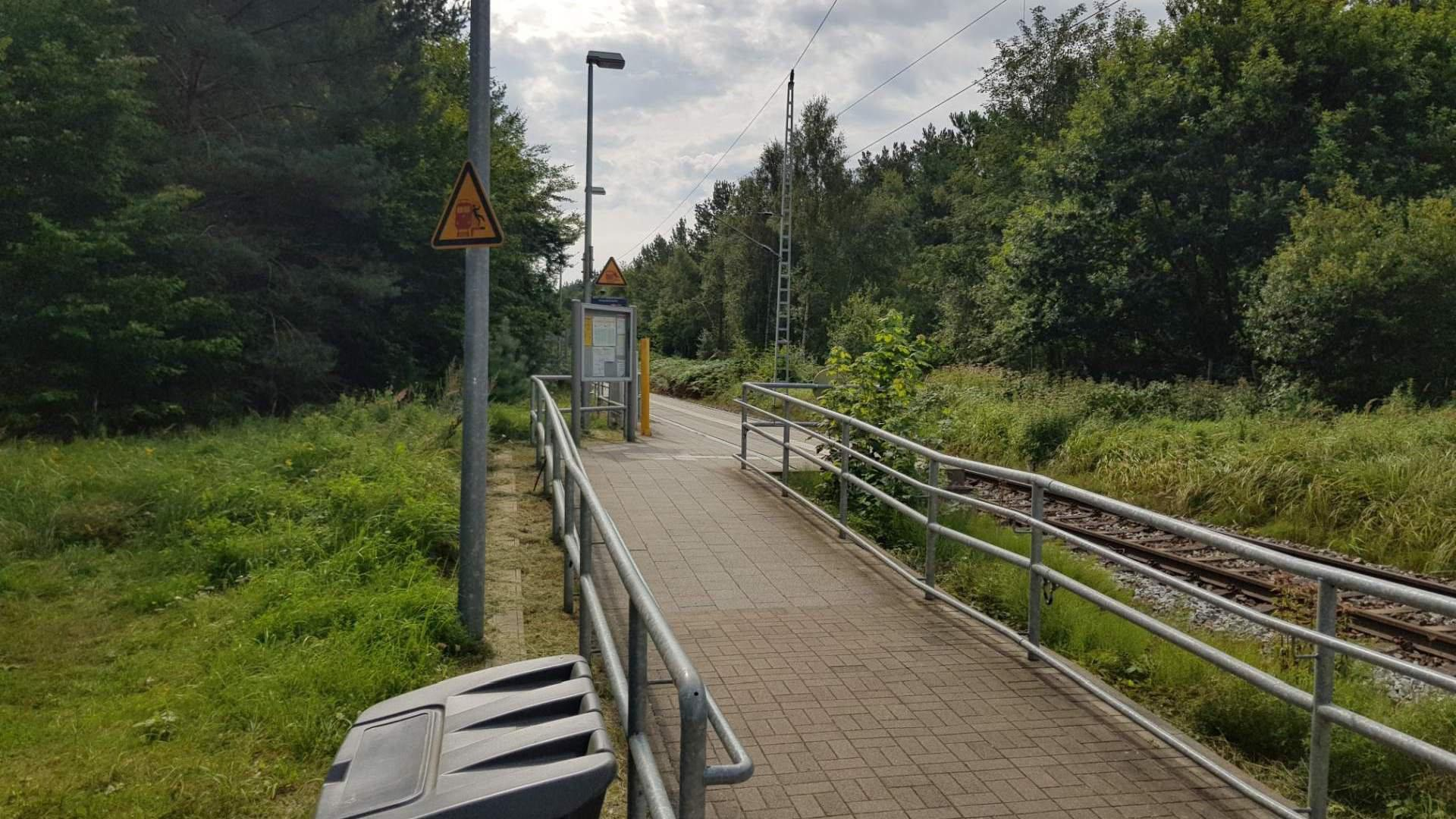
- Prora Ost railway station

General information
- Location: Prora, MV, Germany
- Coordinates: 54°25′47″N 13°34′29″E
- Owner: DB Netz
- Operator: DB Station&Service
- Line: Lietzow–Binz railway
- Platforms: 1
- Tracks: 1
- Train operators: ODEG

Other information
- Website: www.bahnhof.de

History
- Opened: 15 May 1939; 87 years ago
- Electrified: 27 May 1989; 37 years ago

Services
Preceding station	Ostdeutsche Eisenbahn	Following station
Prora towards Rostock Hbf	RE 9	Ostseebad Binz Terminus
Location

Prora Ost (German: Bahnhof Prora Ost) is a railway station in the town of Prora, Mecklenburg-Vorpommern, Germany. The station lies on the Lietzow-Binz railway. The train services are operated by Ostdeutsche Eisenbahn GmbH.

== Train services ==
The station is served by the following service(s):

- Regional services RE 9 Rostock - Velgast - Stralsund - Lietzow - Binz
