= Duwenbeek =

River in Germany

Location
- Country: Germany
- State: Mecklenburg-Vorpommern
- Location: On the island of Rügen
- Reference no.: DE: 967712

Physical characteristics
- Source
  - location: near Bergen auf Rügen
  - coordinates: 54°25′28″N 13°25′21″E
  - elevation: 25 m above sea level (NN)
- Mouth
  - location: In the Koselower See
  - coordinates: 54°28′44″N 13°16′04″E
  - elevation: 0 m above sea level (NN)
- Length: 20 km (12 mi)

Basin features
- Landmarks: Small towns: Bergen; Villages: Parchtitz, Kluis, Trent and Gingst
- Tributaries
  - left: Lanzengraben
- Navigable: no

The Duwenbeek is the largest stream on the German Baltic Sea island of Rügen. The stream originates on the northern edge of the borough of Bergen auf Rügen, flows around the Nonnensee on its eastern side and empties into the bay of Koselower See in front of the island of Ummanz and hence into the Baltic. It flows through the Rügen municipalities of Bergen auf Rügen, Parchtitz and Kluis and forms parts of the boundaries of the municipalities of Bergen, Trent and Gingst.

== Renaturalisation ==
On the occasion of the world fair, Expo 2000, the project "Habitats - The Duwenbeek Project" (Lebensräume - Das Duwenbeek-Projekt), which envisaged the renaturalisation of the stream, was born. Elements of this project were the reflooding of the Nonnensee, the establishment of a wetpark at the mansion in Boldevitz and a stone embankment to reduce the velocity of the stream in the reed belt of the Koselower See.

== See also ==
- List of rivers of Mecklenburg-Vorpommern
