= Nonnen =

Nonnen may refer to:

- Nonnen-see, a lake in the borough of Bergen auf Rügen, Vorpommern-Rügen district, in the German state of Mecklenburg-Vorpommern.
- Emily Nonnen, a British-Swedish writer, translator and artist
