= Charlotte Pistorius =

German poet and letter-writer

- Born: Charlotte Helene Henriette Pritzbuer; 5 November 1777; Reinkenhagen, Province of Pomerania
- Died: 14 September 1850 (aged 72); Garz, Province of Pomerania
- Occupation: Poet
- Known for: Correspondence with Ernst Moritz Arndt and Friedrich Schleiermacher

Charlotte Pistorius (5 November 1777 – 14 September 1850) was a German poet and letter-writer. She belonged to the circle of friends around Ernst Moritz Arndt, and corresponded with him and other notable writers, including Friedrich Schleiermacher. She took care of family members, and supported education for the lower classes of the population.

== Life ==
Born Charlotte Helene Henriette Pritzbuer in Reinkenhagen (now part of Sundhagen), she was the daughter of Theodor Pritzbuer (1731–1819), the local pastor, and his third wife, Helena Dorothea Margarete von Hellström, who died in 1816. In 1787, the family moved to the small town of Garz on the island of Rügen, where her father became pastor at the St.-Petri-Kirche. Charlotte Pritzbuer, inspired by her parental home, acquired an extensive education, mainly as an autodidact.

On 3 September 1797, she married Johann Philipp Pistorius (1767–1823), the second son of pastor Hermann Andreas Pistorius, who was an administrative assistant to her sick father. After the death of her father-in-law in 1798, her brother-in-law Christian Pistorius (1765–1823) moved in with the young couple. Since 1807 her husband had suffered from a lung disease, from which he died in 1823. The marriage had remained childless. Her brother-in-law died the same year, leaving her alone in the vicarage. From 1825 to 1826 she kept the household of the widowed professor Karl Schildener in Greifswald, but then returned to Garz. She devoted herself to charitable causes, such as further education for the lower classes of the population. In 1833 she took in her brother-in-law Karl Pistorius and cared for him until his death in 1844.

Charlotte Pistorius maintained an extensive correspondence. She had known the influential historian Ernst Moritz Arndt since her youth, and they later became friends. Arndt dedicated several poems to her. Correspondence between them has been published in several editions of his letters. As early as 1796 and 1797 she corresponded with Ehrenfried von Willich, who later became a friend of theologian Friedrich Schleiermacher. Schleiermacher met her in 1804 during his visit to Rügen on the occasion of Willich's wedding. She corresponded with him for over ten years, discussing subjects such as literature - including the works of the author Novalis - and religion. She was friends with Charlotte von Kathen, who had already been in correspondence with Arndt and Schleiermacher. Through Karl Gustav Fabricius, the mayor of Stralsund, she was inspired to conduct her own studies on the history of Rügen. She sent essays and drawings to the Gesellschaft für pommersche Geschichte, Altertumskunde und Kunst, which were partly used in the Baltische Studien. In addition she wrote a biography of her father. She left a collection of unpublished poems and poetry drafts.

Pistorius died in Garz at age 72.
