= Ostseebad Binz station =

Railway station in Binz, Germany

Ostseebad Binz
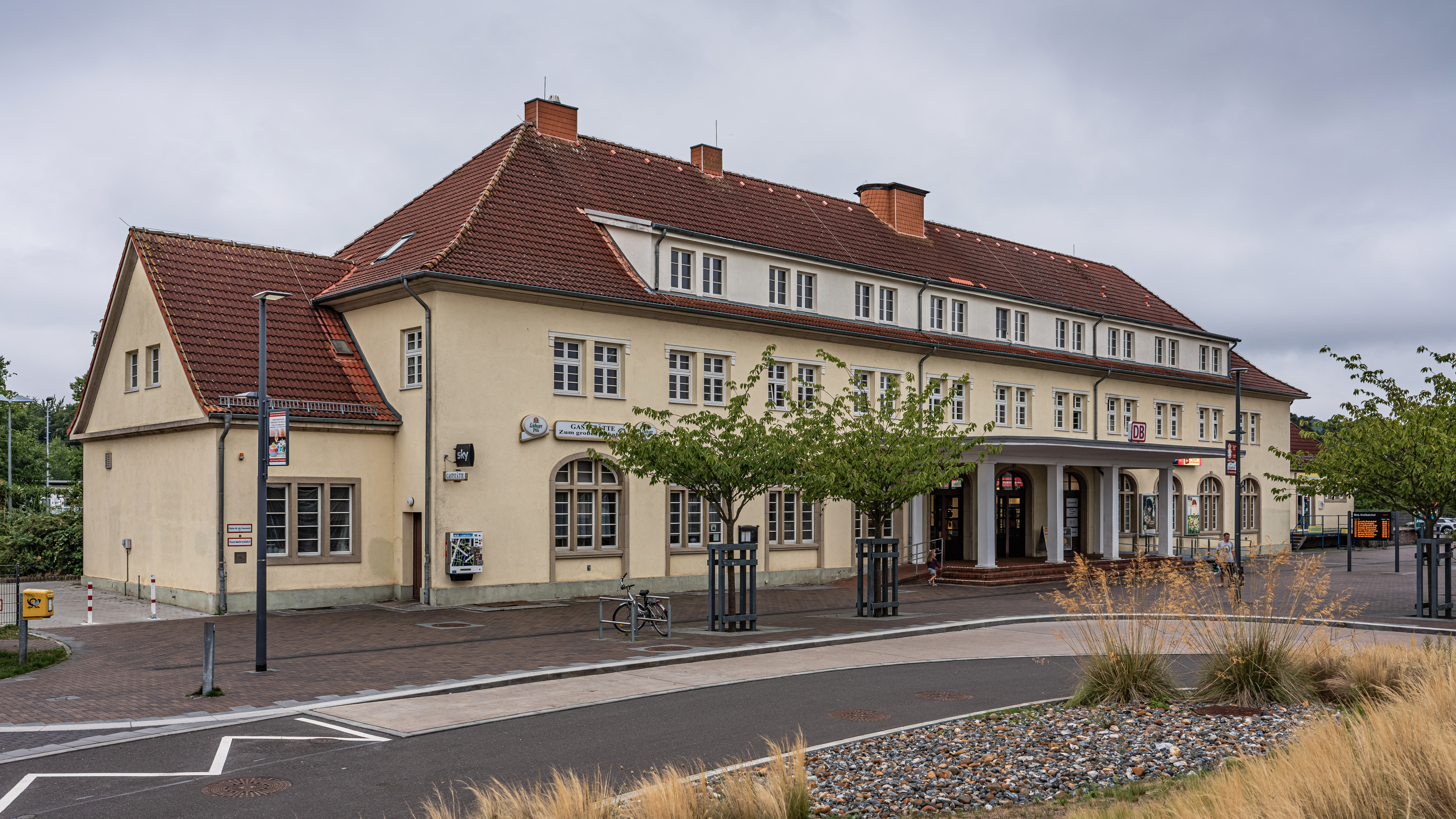
- Ostseebad Binz railway station

General information
- Location: Dollahnerstr. 17, Binz, MV; Germany
- Coordinates: 54°24′18″N 13°36′01″E
- Owner: DB Netz
- Operator: DB Station&Service
- Lines: Lietzow–Binz railway (KBS 190)
- Platforms: 4
- Tracks: 4
- Train operators: ODEG, DB Fernverkehr

Construction
- Accessible: Yes

Other information
- Station code: 653
- DS100 code: WBI
- IBNR: 8011191
- Category: 3
- Website: www.bahnhof.de

History
- Opened: 15 May 1939; 87 years ago
- Electrified: 27 May 1989; 37 years ago
Services
Preceding station	DB Fernverkehr	Following station
Bergen auf Rügen towards Saarbrücken Hbf	ICE 15	Terminus
Bergen auf Rügen towards Hamburg-Altona	ICE 33	Terminus
Preceding station	Ostdeutsche Eisenbahn	Following station
Prora Ost towards Rostock Hbf	RE 9	Terminus
Location

Ostseebad Binz (German: Bahnhof Ostseebad Binz) is a terminus railway station in the town of Binz, Mecklenburg-Vorpommern, Germany. The station lies at the end of the Lietzow-Binz railway and was opened in 1939. The train services are operated by Deutsche Bahn Fernverkehr and Ostdeutsche Eisenbahn GmbH.

== History ==
The station building was completed in 1938. A year later Deutsche Reichsbahn officially opened the railway station together with the Lietzow–Binz railway. Due to the Second World War, however, initially only a few trains operated. There were two pairs of trains per day in 1940. When the war was over, the track was dismantled for reparations and thus the station was also closed. However, it was rebuilt within a few years, so the station became operational again in 1952.

During the time of the GDR, the station was regularly served by express trains. The line was electrified in 1989 because of its relatively high importance for national and international long-distance traffic.

The first Intercity services stopped in Binz station in 1991. In 2000, a fundamental restructuring of the station was completed, including the rebuilding of the platforms. These works cost about 9.5 million Marks.

In March 2011, Binz station was connected to Deutsche Bahn’s Intercity-Express network, with a weekly train pair to Munich.

== Infrastructure ==
The station has three platform tracks. Platform track 2, which is a through track, and track 4, which is a bay platform and just north of the station building, are 55 cm high and attached to the station building. Platform 2 is 344 m long and platform 4 is 171 m long. Platform 3 is a side platform on a through track, which is connected by a protected passenger level crossing with the main platform. The side platform is 315 m long and 76 cm high. Between tracks 2 and 3 there Is a third through track, track 1. This is used exclusively for running through the station to the end of the track, 150 m to the south. Long-distance trains always stop on platforms 2 and 3 and regional trains stop on platform 4. North of the station there is a parking area. The signals are controlled by the electronic control centre in Lietzow. The station forecourt is served by several bus routes that are operated by Rügener Personennahverkehrs GmbH (RPNV). In addition, there is a taxi rank.

== Rail services ==
In 2011, about 40 to 50 trains a day stopped at Binz station. In the 2026 timetable the following lines stop at the station:

Line	Route	Frequency
ICE 15	Ostseebad Binz – Stralsund – Berlin – Berlin Südkreuz – Halle – Erfurt – Frankfurt – Darmstadt – Mannheim – Kaiserslautern – Saarbrücken	2 train pairs to Frankfurt, 1 to Darmstadt, 1 to Saarbrücken
ICE 33	Ostseebad Binz – Stralsund – Rostock – Schwerin – Hamburg – Hamburg-Altona	3 train pairs
RE 9	Ostseebad Binz – Prora – Lietzow (Rügen) – (Bergen auf Rügen – Samtens – Stralsund – Velgast – Ribnitz-Damgarten West – Rostock)	Every hour to Lietzow, every 2 hours to Stralsund

Until the timetable change in December 2016, Ostseebad Binz was often served the summer by a night train to and from destinations in southern Germany that are often changed. During July/August 2014, the Zurich–Berlin City Night Line service was extended once a week to Ostseebad Binz (arriving/departing Rügen on Saturday).

== Gallery ==
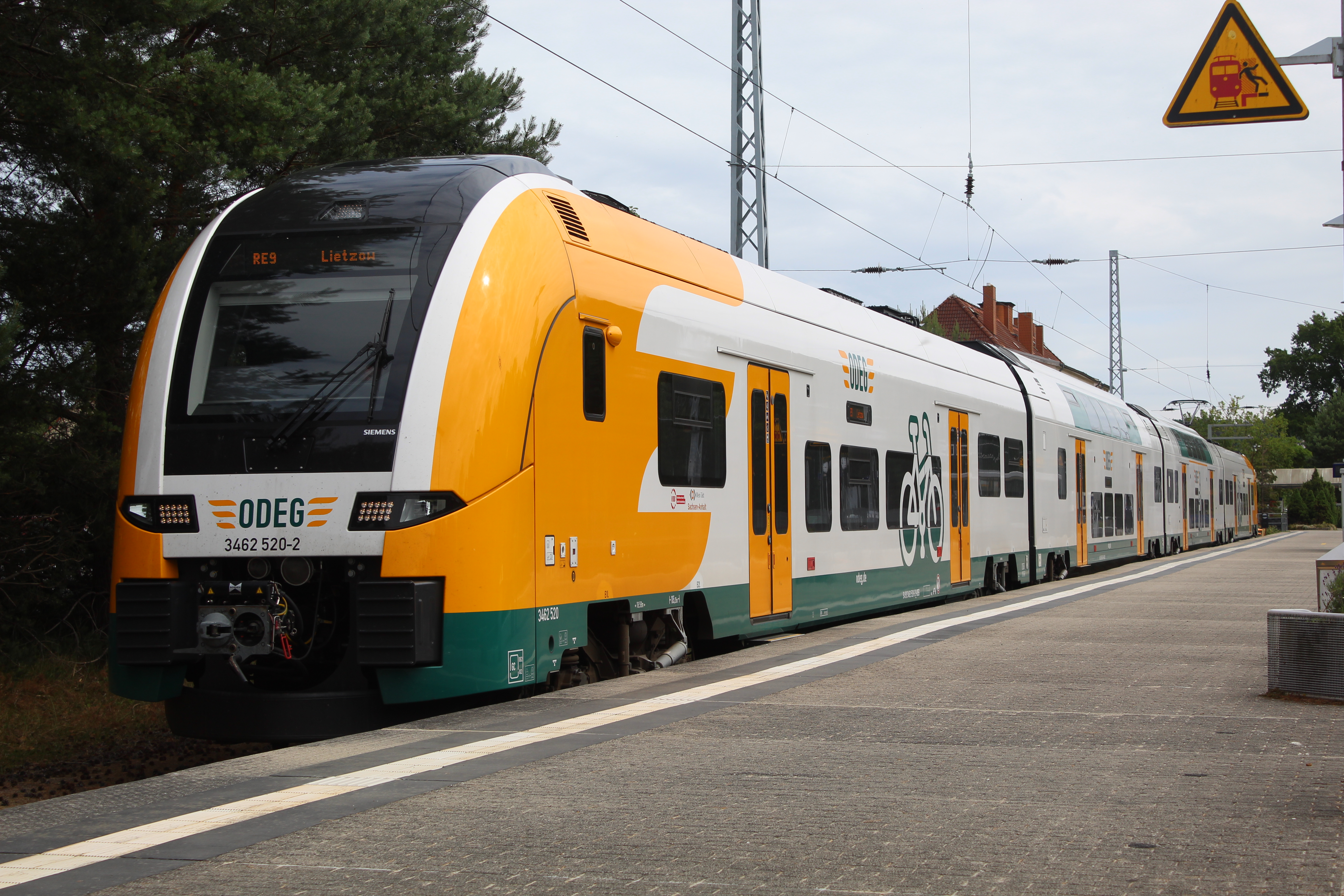
ODEG Siemens Desiro HC as RE 9

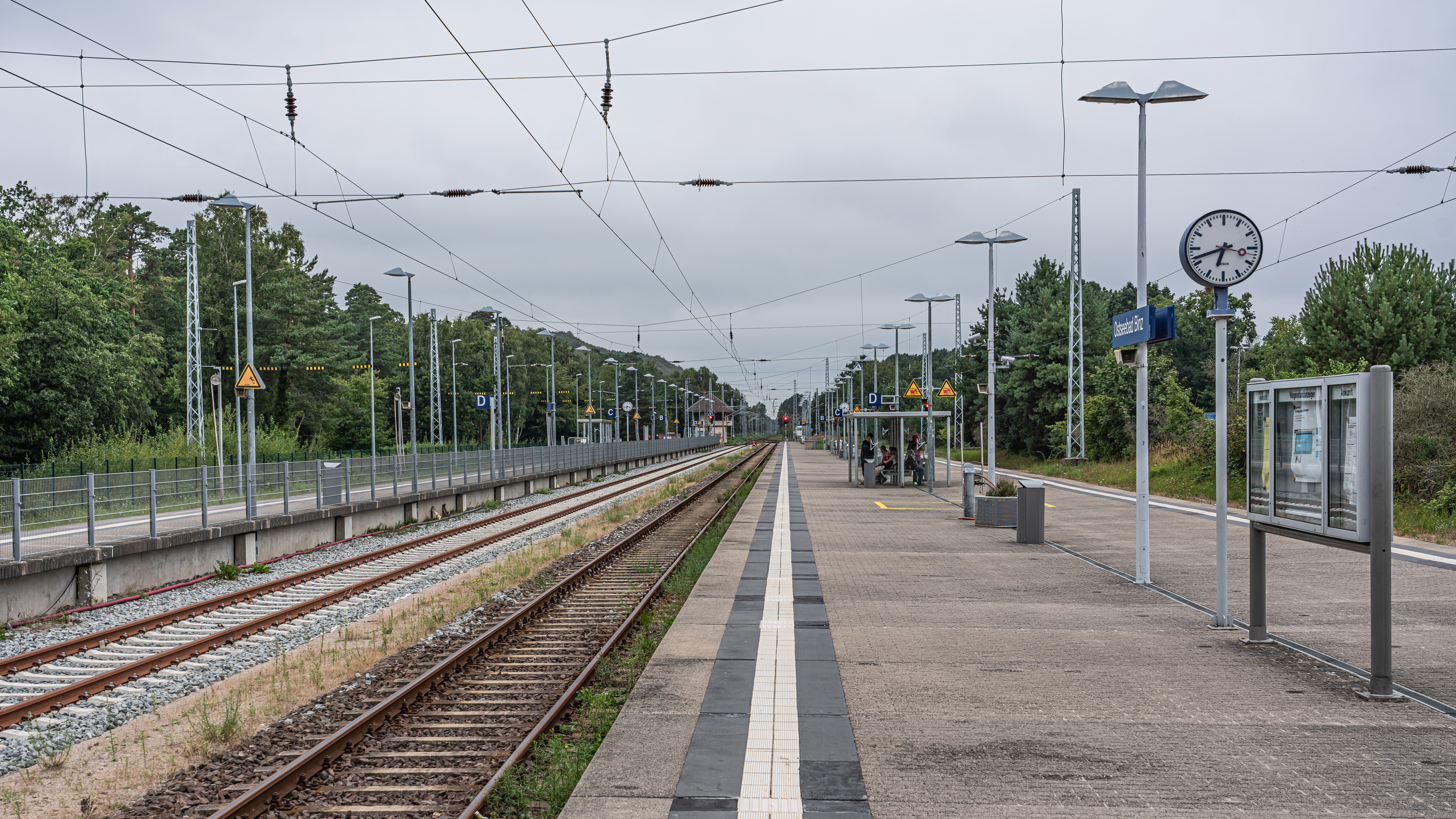
Platforms

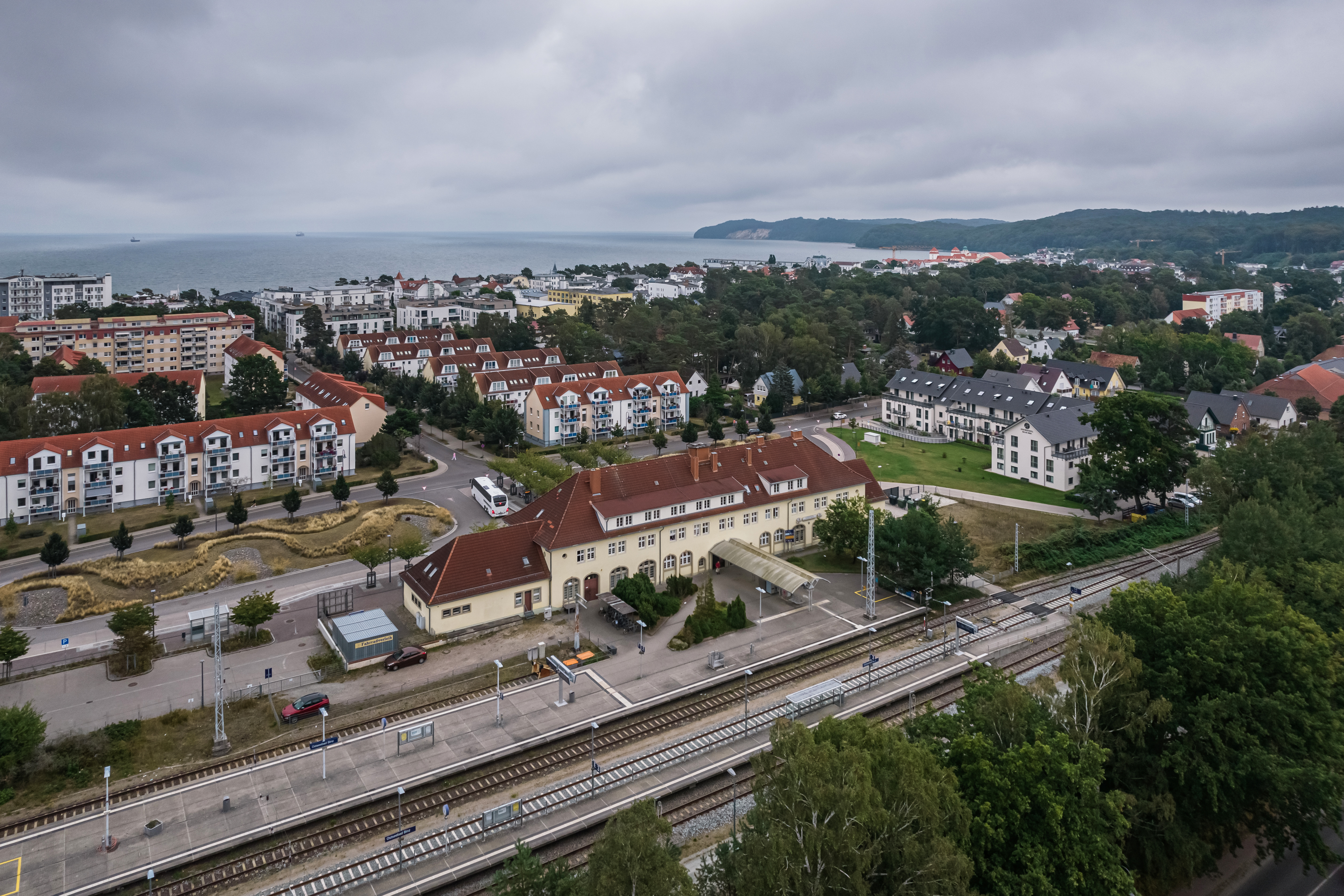
Aerial view
