= Landow Village Church =

Evangelical parish church in Rambin, Rügen, Germany

Coordinates: 54°24′14″N 13°15′34″E

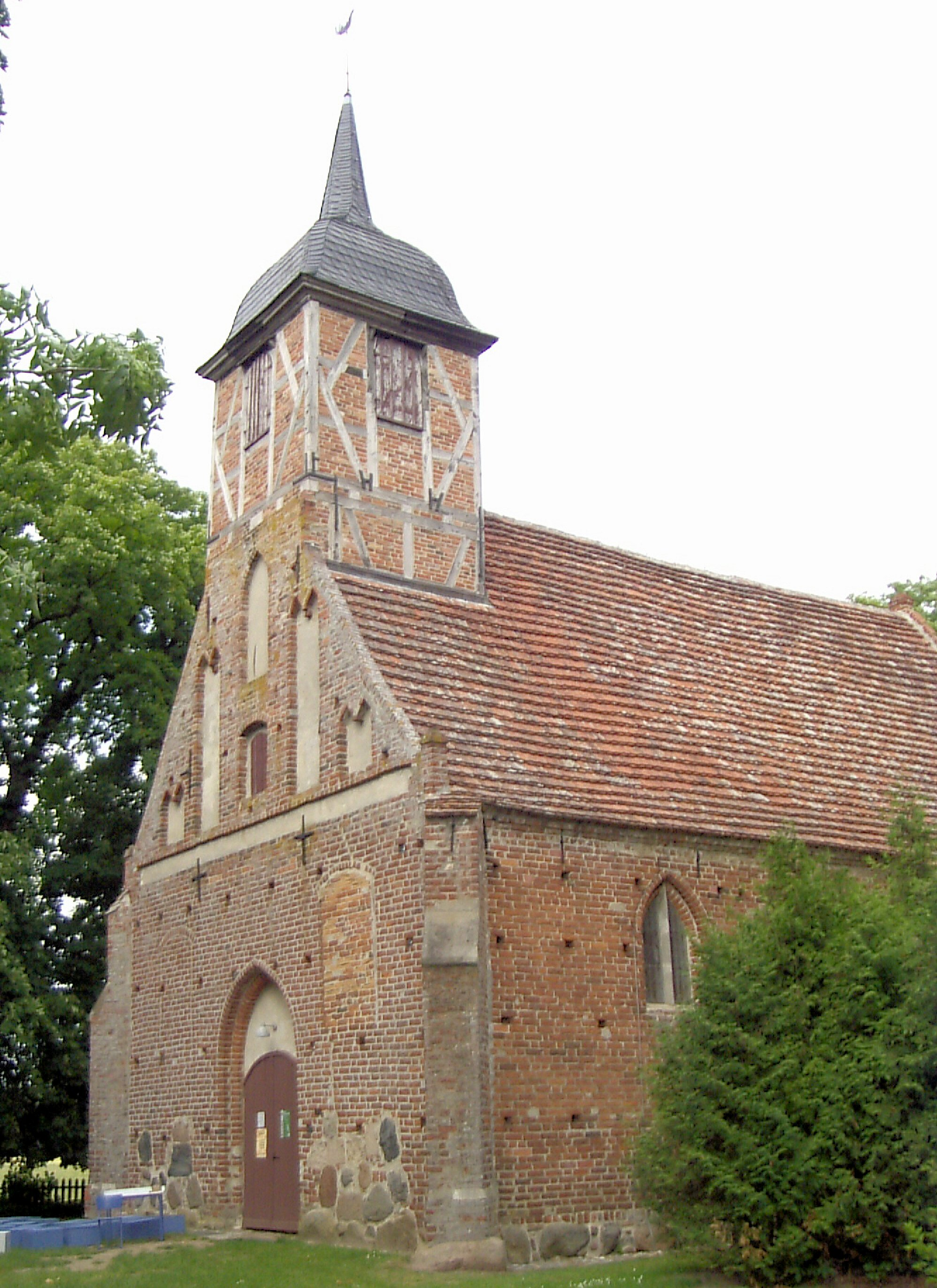
The village church in Landow

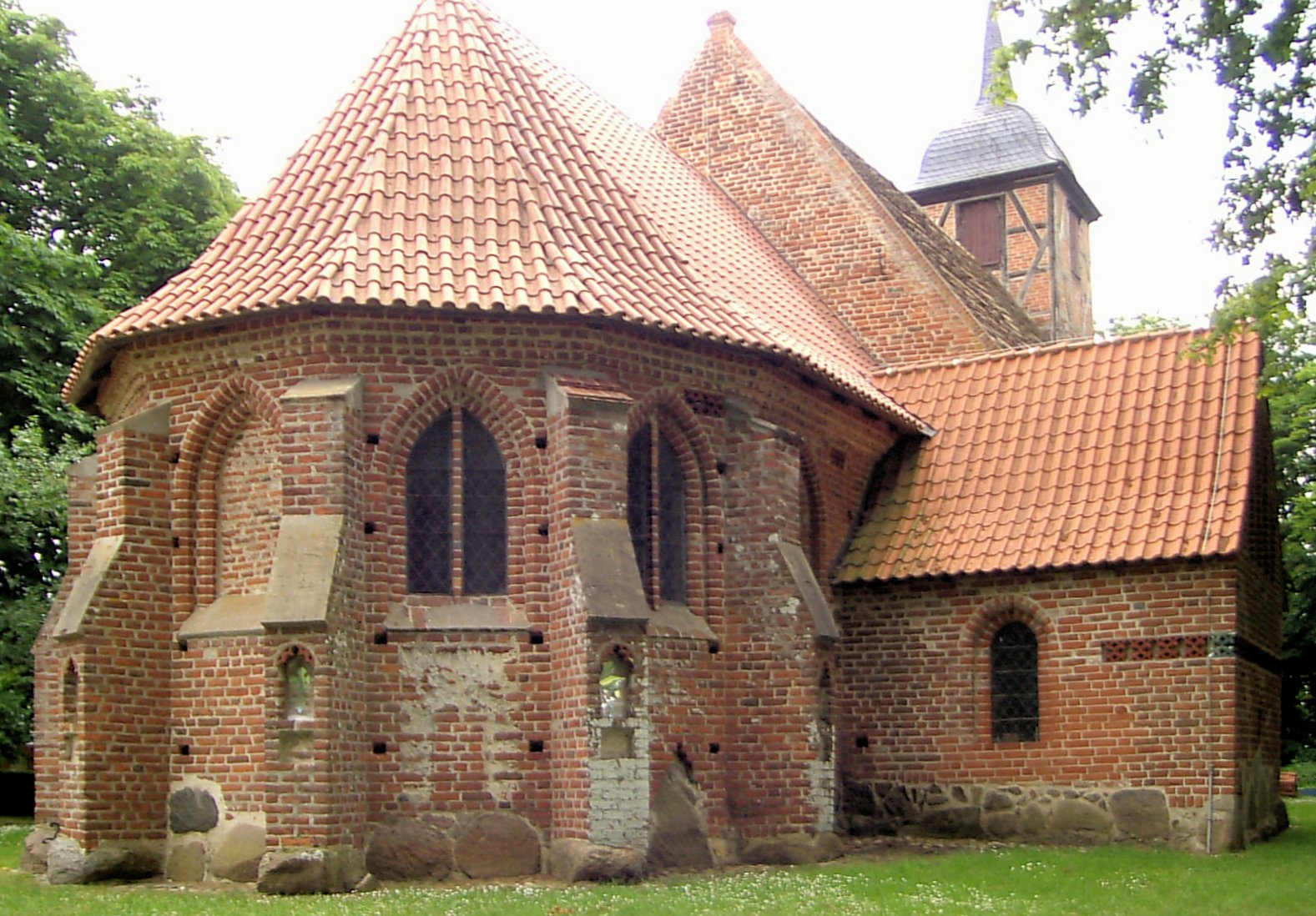
The church from the east

The village church of Landow (German: Dorfkirche Landow) is the Evangelical parish church of the parish of Rambin in the south of the German island of Rügen. It is located in the village of Landow in the municipality of Dreschvitz.

It was built as a Wegekirche in Landow around the year 1312. A Wegekirche is a church which is designed such that the location of the priest and congregation gives the impression that they are on their way to the Lord, facing the Christ, usually in the symbolic form of a cross or painting.

In 2004, dendrochronological research of the oak timber-framing was carried out. This demonstrated that the church is one of the oldest on the island of Rügen and may be the oldest timber-framed church building in North Germany and the entire southeast Baltic Sea region.

The church was sited on an old salt and herring trading route. It was first mentioned in the records when reference was made to a priest at Landow ...plebane (Priester) in Landaue dating to the year 1333. In 1369 a Kaland Brotherhood was mentioned, something which was important for churches in the Middle Ages.

The original timber-framed of the building was bricked in around 1542. The interior was decorated in the baroque style in the 18th century. The altar, font, pulpit and painted wooden ceiling of the church all came from the workshop of the most important Pomeranian sculptor of the baroque style, Elias Kessler from the town of Stralsund. The vestry attached to the church later became a crypt chapel for the family of the church patrons. After 1945, the coffins were removed from the crypt chapel and buried in the cemetery.

During the GDR period, major repairs were carried out, most recently in 1959 on the church roof. In the late 1960s, the continued preservation of the church building became an issue. The consistory of the Evangelical Church of Greifswald felt in 1970 that it was no longer in a position to fund the preservation of the isolated church building. In 1982 the church was assessed as in danger of collapse and, in the 1980s, it was also removed from the county monument list.

The church is now supported by a preservation society. Various events are held in it, including concerts as part of the Mecklenburg-Vorpommern Festival.

The cemetery and its graves, some of which are very old, are also worth seeing.

== Parish ==
The Evangelical parish belongs to the church district of Stralsund within the Pomeranian Evangelical Church.

== See also ==
- List of churches on Rügen

== Literature ==
- Ulrike Reinfeldt: Die Dorfkirche zu Landow. In: Pommern. Zeitschrift für Kultur und Geschichte. Heft 1/2012, ISSN 0032-4167, p. 16–19.
