= Liebitz =

Island in Germany

Geography
- Location: Kubitzer Bodden
- Coordinates: 54°23′58″N 13°12′51″E
- Area: 0.64 ha (1.6 acres)
- Length: 1 km (0.6 mi)
- Width: 0.700 km (0.435 mi)

Administration
- Germany

Demographics
- Population: 0

Liebitz (German pronunciation: [ˈliːbɪts]) is a German island in the lagoon of Kubitzer Bodden about 700 metres west of Germany's largest island, Rügen, in the state of Mecklenburg-Vorpommern. It belongs to the municipality of Dreschvitz.

The island is about 1,000 × 700 metres across and has an area of about 64 ha. In the west of this low island, only a few metres high, is the island's Pleistocene core, which is increasingly being eroded by the water. In the east there are flat salt meadows.

The island of Liebitz is part of the nature reserve named after it and lies within the West Pomeranian Lagoon Area National Park. It is forbidden to entering the bird reserve without permission. The eastern part of the island is the most densely populated by breeding birds. In addition to black-headed gulls, common gulls breed here in large colonies. Sand martins settle on the steep coast of the morainic core. In addition, various species of wader, ducks and geese breed on the island. The number of breeding pairs fell drastically after 1992, but has been stable since 1998.
