= Christian Pistorius =

German writer and translator

Christian Brandanus Hermann Pistorius (12 May 1763 or 1765 – 9 November 1823) was a German writer and translator.

== Life ==
Pistorius was born in Poseritz. The eldest son of the Poseritzer provost Hermann Andreas Pistorius and his wife Sophie Juliane, daughter of provost Christian Anton Brunnemann in Bergen auf Rügen, he was taught by his father and tutors. Without having attended a higher public educational institution, he proved his extensive knowledge in a number of scientific papers. He wrote articles for various journals and produced translations from Latin and English.

Because of his unstable health he lived in his father's household until the latter's death in 1798. Then he moved to his brother Philipp Pistorius (1767-1823), who was pastor in Garz on Rügen, where he was last cared for by his sister-in-law Charlotte Pistorius.

== Publications ==
- Priestley's Liturgie. 1787.
- Translations from English
  - Middleton: Theologische Abhandlungen. 1793.
  - James Belshams Versuche über Gegenstände der Philosophie, Theologie, Litteratur und Politik. Lange, Berlin and Stralsund 1798.
  - Abendzeitvertreib in unterhaltenden Schilderungen aus dem wirklichen Leben und vermischten Aufsätzen als Ersatz der Romanen-Lektüre. Stiller, Leipzig und Rostock 1807.
  - James Riley: Gefangenschaft und Reise in Afrika. 1817. (Sufferings in Africa)
- Translations from French
  - Charles de Brosses: Ueber den Dienst der Fetischengötter oder Vergleichung der alten Religion Egyptens mit der heutigen Religion Nigritiens. Lange, Berlin und Stralsund 1785.
- Translations from Latin
  - Marcus Annaeus Lucanus: Pharsalia. 1802.
  - Dion. Catos moralische Distichen metrisch übersetzt. 1815.
  - Aulus Persius Flaccus: 3. Satire 1812.
