= Parchtitz =

- Municipality
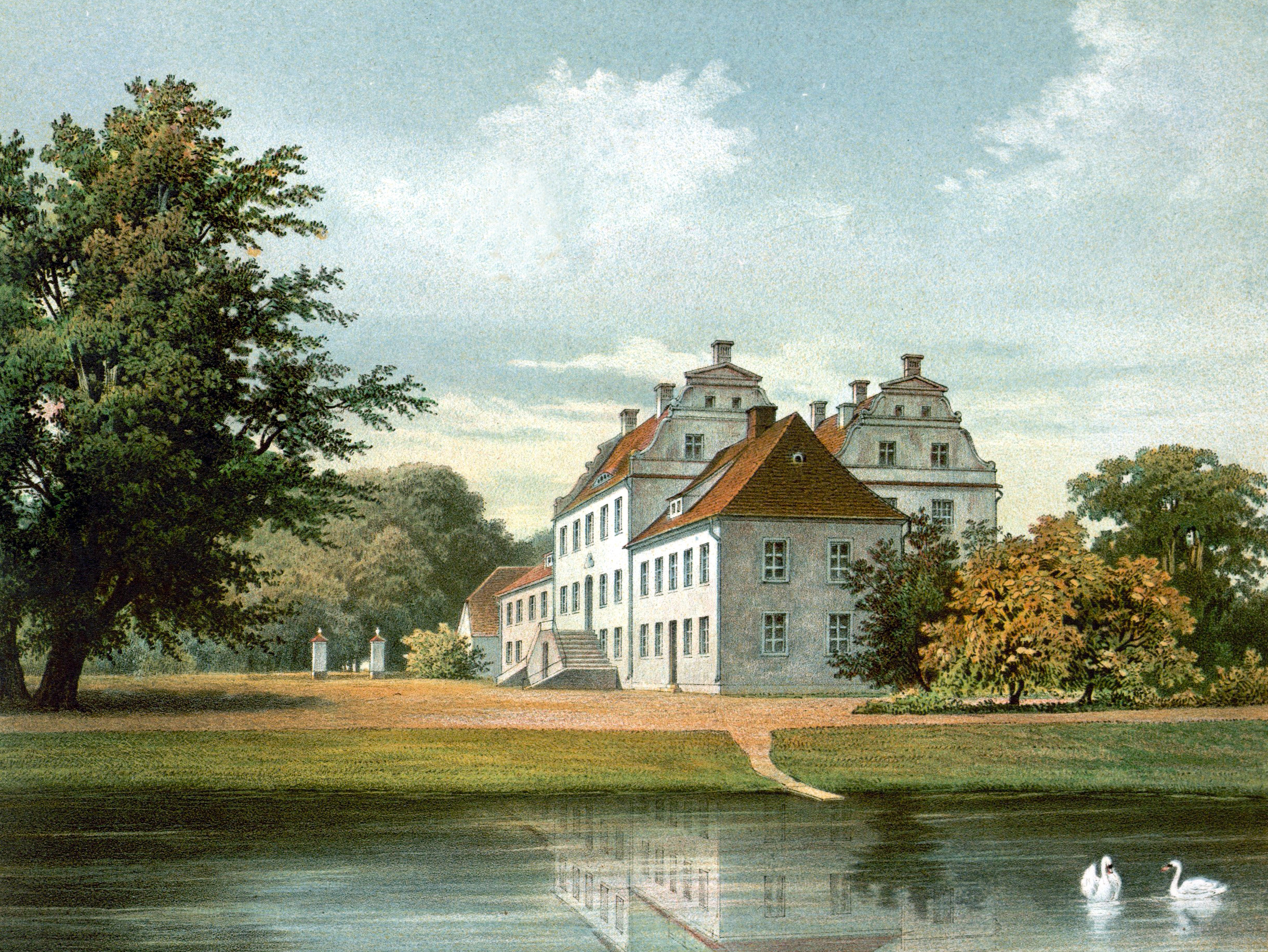
- Manour House Boldewitz in Parchtitz municipality

- Location of Parchtitz within Vorpommern-Rügen district
- Interactive map of Parchtitz
- Location within Germany Location within Mecklenburg-Vorpommern
- Coordinates: 54°25′N 13°23′E
- Country: Germany
- State: Mecklenburg-Vorpommern
- District: Vorpommern-Rügen
- Municipal assoc.: Bergen auf Rügen

Government
  - Mayor: Wilfried Schuldt

Area
  - Total: 25.05 km^{2} (9.67 sq mi)
- Elevation: 27 m (89 ft)

Population (2025-12-31)
  - Total: 725
  - Density: 28.9/km^{2} (75.0/sq mi)
- Time zone: UTC+01:00 (CET)
  - Summer (DST): UTC+02:00 (CEST)
- Postal codes: 18528
- Dialling codes: 03838, 038305
- Vehicle registration: RÜG
- Website: www.amt-bergen-auf-ruegen.de

Parchtitz is a municipality in the Vorpommern-Rügen district, in Mecklenburg-Vorpommern, Germany.

== Geography and transport ==
Parchtitz is about 3 kilometres northwest of Bergen auf Rügen and lies on the Duwenbeek, the only large stream on Rügen. The stream's source is the lake of Nonnensee, which also lies within Parchtitz and which was re-established in 1993 after a long period of being drained. The village lies immediately on the Landesstraße 30 from Bergen to Gingst. The B 96 and the railway line from Stralsund to Sassnitz runs east of the village.

=== Villages ===
The following villages fall within the municipality:

- Parchtitz
- Boldevitz
- Gademow
- Muglitz
- Neuendorf
- Platvitz
- Reischvitz
- Volkshagen
- Willihof
