= West-Rügen =

- Amt
- Location of West-Rügen within Vorpommern-Rügen district
- Interactive map of West-Rügen
- Location within Germany Location within Mecklenburg-Vorpommern
- Coordinates: 54°28′N 13°11′E
- Country: Germany
- State: Mecklenburg-Vorpommern
- District: Vorpommern-Rügen
- Seat: Samtens
- Subdivisions: 11 municipalities

Area
  - Total: 290.73 km^{2} (112.25 sq mi)

Population (2025-12-31)
  - Total: 9,383
  - Density: 32.27/km^{2} (83.59/sq mi)
- Time zone: UTC+01:00 (CET)
  - Summer (DST): UTC+02:00 (CEST)
- Website: www.amt-westruegen.de

West-Rügen is an Amt in the district of Vorpommern-Rügen, in Mecklenburg-Vorpommern, Germany. The seat of the Amt is in Samtens.

The Amt West-Rügen consists of the following municipalities:

1. Altefähr
2. Dreschvitz
3. Gingst
4. Insel Hiddensee
5. Kluis
6. Neuenkirchen
7. Rambin
8. Samtens
9. Schaprode
10. Trent
11. Ummanz
