= Thesenvitz =

- Ortsteil of Bergen auf Rügen
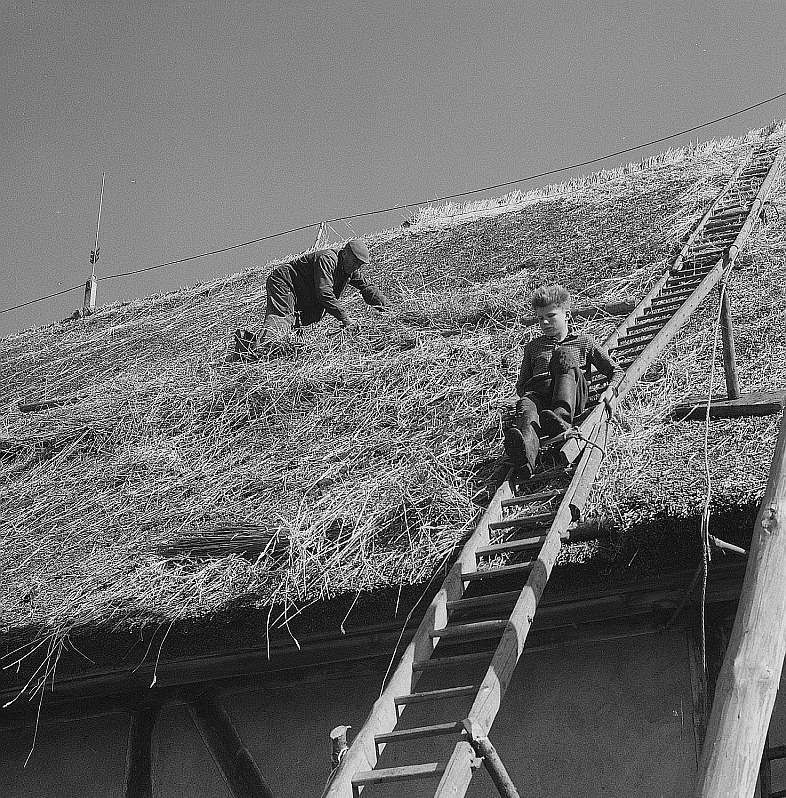
- Constructing a thatched roof in Thesenvitz
- Interactive map of Thesenvitz
- Location within Germany Location within Mecklenburg-Vorpommern
- Coordinates: 54°27′N 13°22′E
- Country: Germany
- State: Mecklenburg-Vorpommern
- District: Vorpommern-Rügen
- Town: Bergen auf Rügen

Area
  - Total: 9.65 km^{2} (3.73 sq mi)
- Elevation: 30 m (98 ft)

Population (2009-12-31)
  - Total: 399
  - Density: 41.3/km^{2} (107/sq mi)
- Time zone: UTC+01:00 (CET)
  - Summer (DST): UTC+02:00 (CEST)
- Postal codes: 18528
- Dialling codes: 03838
- Vehicle registration: RÜG
- Website: www.amt-bergen-auf-ruegen.de

Thesenvitz is a village and a former municipality in the Vorpommern-Rügen district, in Mecklenburg-Vorpommern, Germany. Since 1 January 2011, it is part of the town Bergen auf Rügen.
