= Neuenkirchen, Rügen =

Neuenkirchen
- Municipality
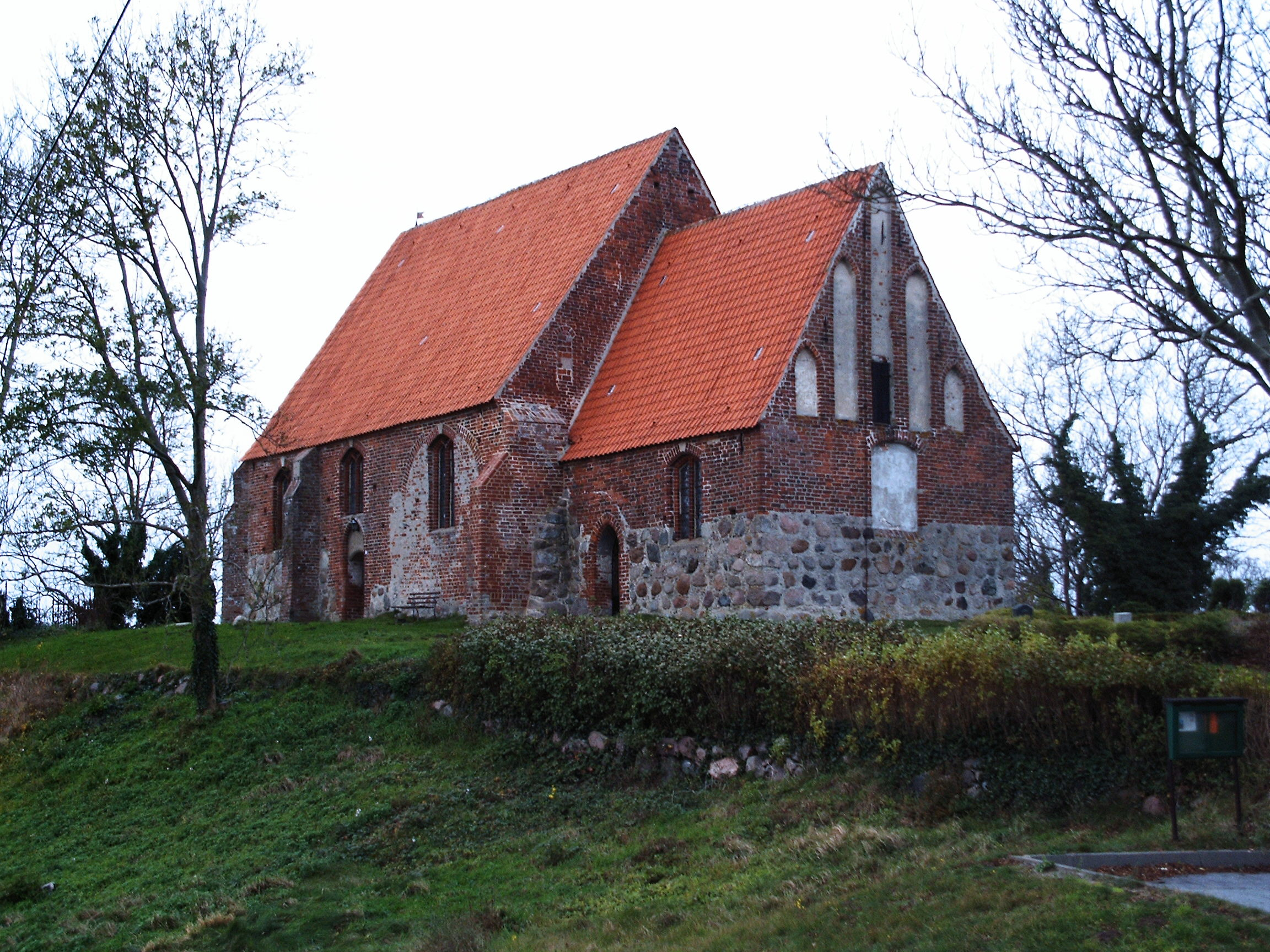
- Church of Neuenkirchen on Rügen Island

- Location of Neuenkirchen within Vorpommern-Rügen district
- Interactive map of Neuenkirchen
- Location within Germany Location within Mecklenburg-Vorpommern
- Coordinates: 54°32′39″N 13°19′53″E
- Country: Germany
- State: Mecklenburg-Vorpommern
- District: Vorpommern-Rügen
- Municipal assoc.: West-Rügen
- Subdivisions: 13

Government
  - Mayor: Dirk Rogge

Area
  - Total: 22.94 km^{2} (8.86 sq mi)
- Elevation: 3 m (9.8 ft)

Population (2025-12-31)
  - Total: 270
  - Density: 12/km^{2} (30/sq mi)
- Time zone: UTC+01:00 (CET)
  - Summer (DST): UTC+02:00 (CEST)
- Postal codes: 18569
- Dialling codes: 038309
- Vehicle registration: RÜG

Neuenkirchen (German pronunciation: [ˈnɔʏənˌkɪʁçn̩]) is a municipality in the Vorpommern-Rügen district, in Mecklenburg-Vorpommern, Germany.

== History ==
Neuenkirchen is first mentioned in 1318 as Nygenkerke.

Until 1326, the village was part of the Principality of Rügen and, thereafter, the Duchy of Pomerania. Under the Treaty of Westphalia in 1648, Rügen, and thus the region of Neuenkirchen, became part of Swedish Pomerania. In 1815, Neuenkirchen went to the Prussian Province of Pomerania as part of New Western Pomerania.

Since 1818, Neuenkirchen has been part of the county (Landkreis or Kreis) of Rügen. Only from 1952 to 1955 was it part of the so-called county of Bergen. From 1955 to 1990 it was part of the county (Kreis) of Rügen within the province of Rostock and, in 1990, also went into the state of Mecklenburg-Western Pomerania. The county (now a Landkreis again) of Rügen merged into the county of Vorpommern-Rügen in 2011.

== Sights ==
- Brick Gothic Church of Mary Magdalene, built between 1380 and 1450 with the oldest church bell on Rügen
- Trakehner horse stud farm at Gut Tribbevitz
- Neogothic manor house of Gut Tribbevitz
- Historic manor house of Gut Grubnow
- Hoch Hilgor viewing point with Grümbke Tower
- Neuendorfer Wiek and Beuchel Island Nature Reserve (bird island with seabirds and eagles)
- Tetzitzer See, Liddow Peninsula and Banzelvitz Hills Nature Reserve (crane and goose roosting area)
- Rodeliner Berg viewing point on the Tetzitzer See with view of the Großer Jasmunder Bodden and valuable Trockenrasen fauna
- Viewing point near Moritzhagen (bird roost)
- Laaser Berge viewing point
- Liddow cultural manor house as exhibition and project workshop
- Vieregge harbour village
- Former NVA (Nationale Volksarmee) base near Moritzhagen
