= Charlotte von Kathen =

German salonist

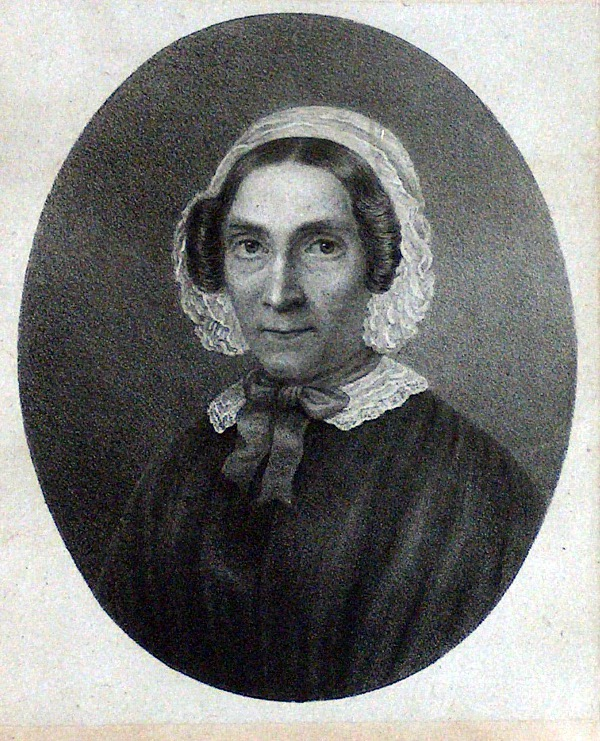
Charlotte von Kathen, c. 1840

Charlotte von Kathen (1777–1850), was a German salonist and writer. She wrote historically important descriptions of contemporary literary personalities who frequented her salon.
