= Dreschvitz =

- Municipality
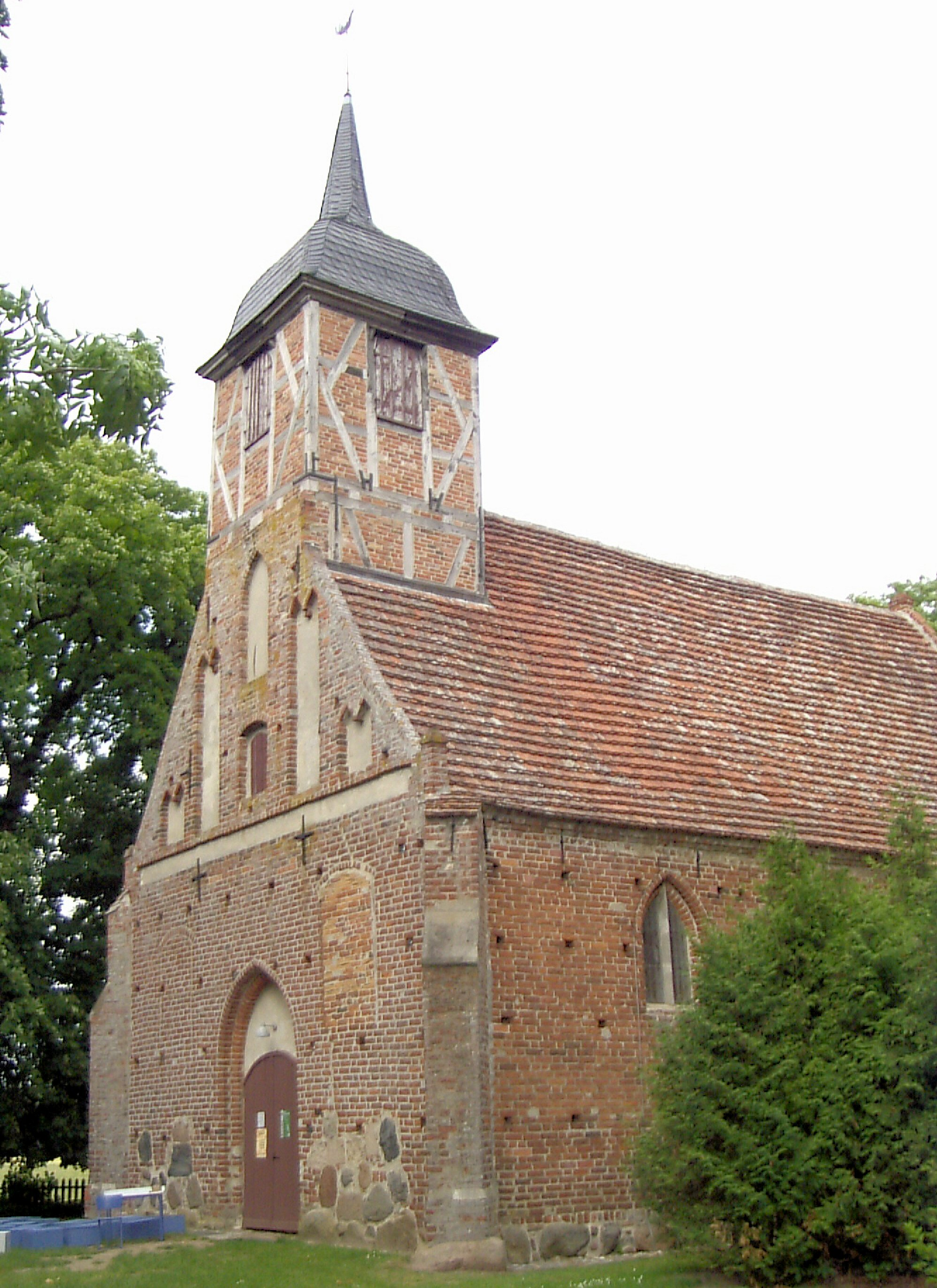
- Church

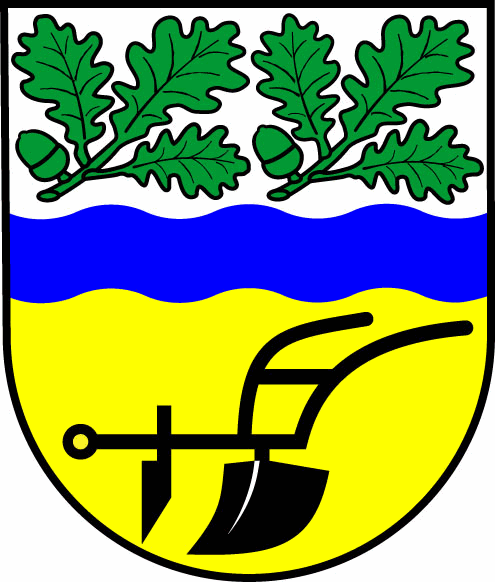
- Coat of arms

- Location of Dreschvitz within Vorpommern-Rügen district
- Interactive map of Dreschvitz
- Location within Germany Location within Mecklenburg-Vorpommern
- Coordinates: 54°23′N 13°19′E
- Country: Germany
- State: Mecklenburg-Vorpommern
- District: Vorpommern-Rügen
- Municipal assoc.: West-Rügen

Government
  - Mayor: Olaf Braumann

Area
  - Total: 22.52 km^{2} (8.70 sq mi)
- Elevation: 10 m (33 ft)

Population (2025-12-31)
  - Total: 767
  - Density: 34.1/km^{2} (88.2/sq mi)
- Time zone: UTC+01:00 (CET)
  - Summer (DST): UTC+02:00 (CEST)
- Postal codes: 18573
- Dialling codes: 038306
- Vehicle registration: RÜG

Dreschvitz is a municipality in southwest Vorpommern-Rügen, a district on the island of Rügen in Mecklenburg-Vorpommern, Germany. It is managed from the Amt of West-Rügen with its head offices in the village of Samtens.

== Geography ==
The village lies on the lagoon of Kubitzer Bodden. The villages of Bußvitz, Dußvitz, Güttin, Landow, Mölln, Ralow and Rugenhof all belong to the municipality of Dreschvitz. The island of Liebitz also lies within its territory.

== History ==
The village was first mentioned in the records in 1314 on an entry in an old deed of ownership. Originally a dead-end village (Gassendorf) with four large estates, Dreschvitz is only 3 kilometres from the old so-called Salt Road (Salzstraße).

Until 1326, the settlement was part of the Principality of Rügen and, thereafter, of the Duchy of Pomerania.

Under the Treaty of Westphalia in 1648, Rügen, and therefore Dreschvitz, ended up under Swedish rule, partitioned from the Duchy of Pomerania. In 1815, the parish along with the rest of West Pomerania went into the Prussian Province of Pomerania.

In 1818, Dreschvitz became part of the shire county of Rügen. From 1952 to 1955 it was part of the County of Putbus. From 1955 to 1990, the village was part of the County of Rügen in the district of Rostock and the state of Mecklenburg-Western Pomerania. In 1990, it was renamed the shire county (Landkreis) of Rügen, but this was finally merged in 2011 into the new county of Vorpommern-Rügen.

By closing the gaps between buildings and development of building land, Dreschvitz has recorded an increase in population since 1990, bucking the trend. Many events of all types are held today in and next to the "House of Generations" (Haus der Generationen), a community centre.

== Politics ==
=== Municipal council ===
In the last local elections on 7 June 2009, Olaf Braumann (FDP) was re-elected as mayor with 62% of the vote. There are nine councillors on the municipal council in addition to the chairman.

The council is composed as follows:

- FDP with the chairman – five seats
- CDU – two seats
- Der Bürgerwille ("Citizens Voice") – two seats

=== Coat of arms ===
The coat of arms was adopted on 30 March 2010 by the Home Office and registered under as No. 331 in the state coat of arms register.

In 1989, the occasion of Dreschvitz's 675th anniversary, a coat of arms was designed and flags and postcards circulated. However, they failed to properly register the coat of arms. It was then forgotten again. With the rediscovery of the documents, it was found that the coat of arms was now identical to that of a municipality in Schleswig-Holstein. After amending it and applying for approval, the coat of arms was authorised on 24 April 2010 and presented to the village in a ceremony by the interior minister of Mecklenburg-Vorpommern.

The two green oak branches represent the forestry industry and long hunting tradition in the community. Separated by a so-called blue wavy bar, which represents the location of the village on the bodden coast of Priebowsche Wedde, is a plough in the lower section. This symbolizes the intensive agricultural use of the fields belonging to the parish.

The coat of arms was designed by Jürgen Frenkel from Dreschvitz.

=== Flag ===
The flag is divided longitudinally white - blue - yellow, and the wavy blue stripes making up one seventh of the height, the white and yellow stripes each making up three sevenths of the height of the flag. In the centre of the white stripes are two diagonal green oak branches with three leaves and a green acorn next to one other. In the middle of the yellow stripe is a wheel-less black plough. The height to length ratio of the flag is 3:5.

The flag was designed by Jürgen Frenkel from Dreschvitz.

== Economy and infrastructure ==
The municipality is largely agricultural.

In the parish of Güttin is the only airfield on the island of Rügen. At Rügen Airport, in addition to timetabled flights by light aircraft in the peak season round trips over the island may be booked. Every second weekend in July the local flying club holds flying days.

== Sights ==
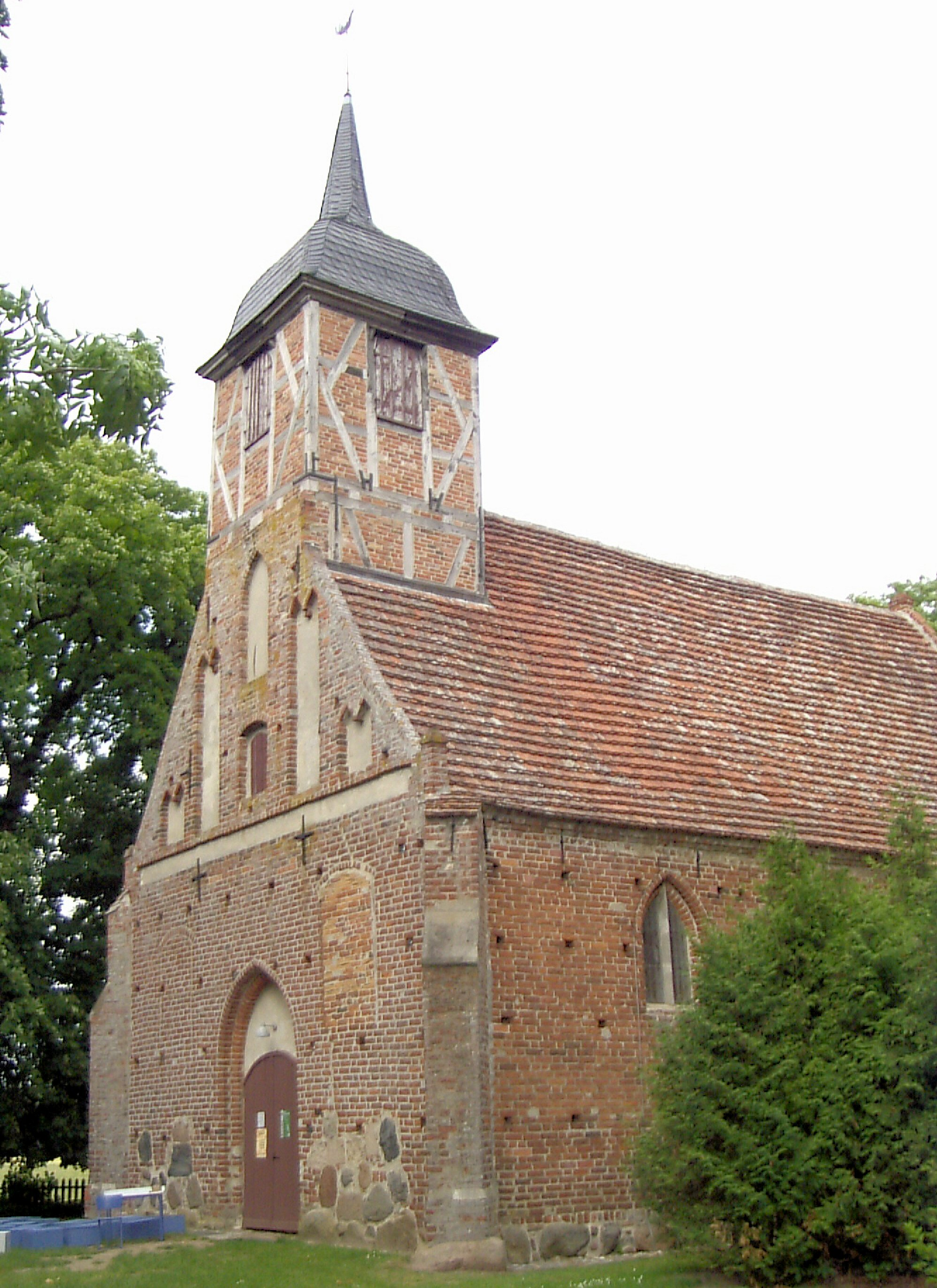

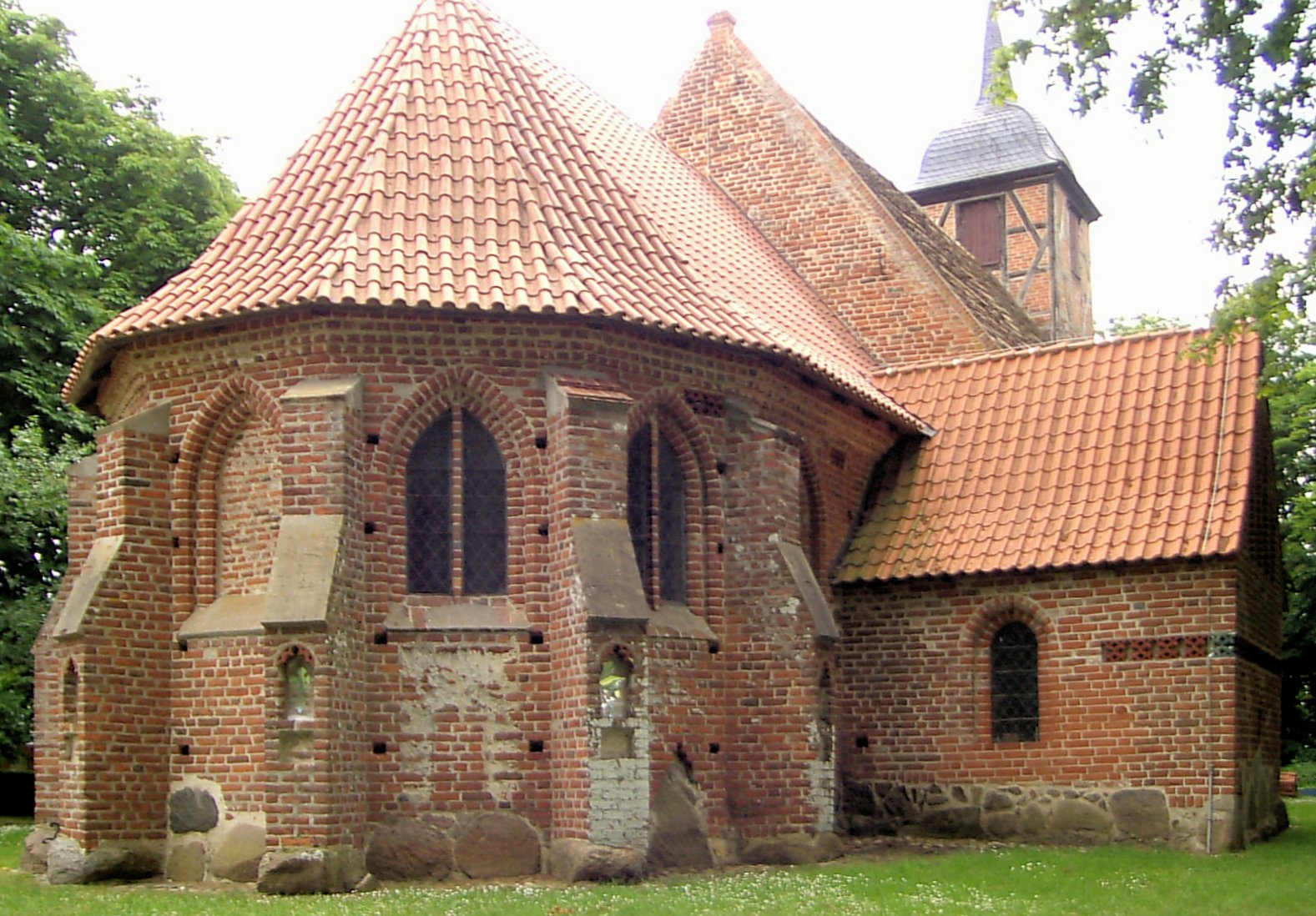

The village church of Landow is designed as a Wegekirche, a church which is laid out so that the priest and congregation are positioned as if they were on their way to the Lord, usually facing a returning Christ or a symbol such as a crucifix or painting. It is probably the oldest timber-framed church in the entire southeastern Baltic Sea region. The oak wood of the timber-frames comes from tree-felling that took place in 1312 or 1313. The original church was surrounded by a wall in 1546. The church is supported by a preservation society. It is home to numerous events, including concerts of the Mecklenburg-Vorpommern Festival.

== Personalities ==
The following personalities were born in Dreschvitz:

1939: Dieter Freese, murderer and robber
