= Garz (Rügen) =

Town in Mecklenburg-Vorpommern, Germany

- Town
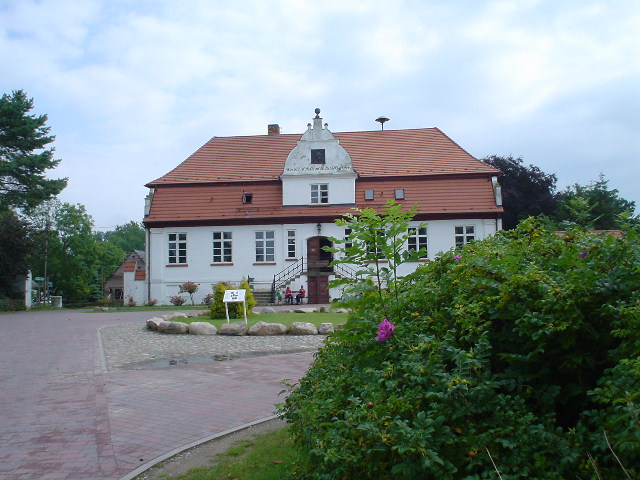
- The birthplace of Ernst Moritz Arndt in Garz

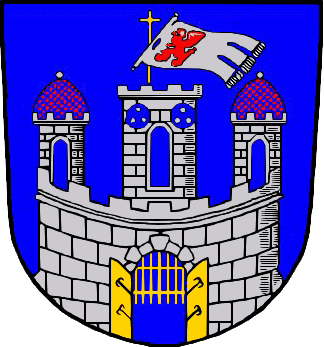
- Coat of arms

- Location of Garz within Vorpommern-Rügen district
- Interactive map of Garz
- Location within Germany Location within Mecklenburg-Vorpommern
- Coordinates: 54°19′N 13°21′E
- Country: Germany
- State: Mecklenburg-Vorpommern
- District: Vorpommern-Rügen
- Municipal assoc.: Bergen auf Rügen

Government
  - Mayor: Sebastian Kösling

Area
  - Total: 65.89 km^{2} (25.44 sq mi)
- Elevation: 15 m (49 ft)

Population (2025-12-31)
  - Total: 2,148
  - Density: 32.60/km^{2} (84.43/sq mi)
- Time zone: UTC+01:00 (CET)
  - Summer (DST): UTC+02:00 (CEST)
- Postal codes: 18574
- Dialling codes: 03838, 038304, 038307
- Vehicle registration: VR/RÜG

Garz (German pronunciation: [ˈɡaʁts]) is a town in the county of Vorpommern-Rügen in the German state of Mecklenburg-Vorpommern. The town is administered by the Amt of Bergen auf Rügen, in the town of the same name.

== Geography ==
Garz lies in the south of the island of Rügen, about 5 kilometres from the coast. The surrounding area comprises low rolling hills, and the highest point is the Kanonenberg at 34 metres above sea level. Garz is 22 kilometres from Stralsund on the mainland, and 12 kilometres from the county town of Bergen auf Rügen.

The following municipalities belong to Garz/Rügen: Bietengast, Dumsevitz, Foßberg, Freudenberg, Glewitz, Götzlaffshagen, Grabow, Groß Schoritz, Karnitz, Klein Stubben, Kniepow, Koldevitz, Kowall, Losentitz, Maltzien, Poltenbusch, Poppelvitz, Rosengarten, Schabernack, Silmenitz, Swiene, Tangnitz, Wentorf, Zicker and Zudar.

== History ==
=== Origin of the name ===
In Karennz, Kerentia or Charenza were the names given to a Slavic castle that was hard fought for in 1168 and 1234 and at one time, the town was thought to be the former princely residence of Charenza, but today that seems unlikely.

In 1327, a town seal bore the name Chertz in Ruya (Rügen). The name "Garz", however, probably comes from the Slavic "gardec" or "gard" and means "fortified place" or "little castle" (as in Stargard). The precursor of Garz is more likely to have been the town of Ruyendal.

=== Early history ===
Around the turn of the first millennium, the inhabitants of Rügen were from the East Germanic tribe of the Rugii, who, from the 7th century, were followed by the Rani, a West Slavic tribe. In the 11th and 12th centuries, a Slavic castle with a rampart and settlement existed here as a royal residence. The well-preserved burgwall was seen by historical writers of the 19th and 20th centuries as that of the legendary prince's residence of Charenza. Recent interdisciplinary research in the years 2004 and 2005, however, has shown that the burgwall at Venz (between Gingst and Trent on the shores of the Neuendorfer Wiek) is much more likely to have been the aristocratic seat and temple castle of Charenza. The latter was surrendered without a fight on 16 June 1168 - one day after the conquest of the Jaromarsburg on Cape Arkona - to the King of Denmark Valdemar I and his army commander, Absalon of Roskilde, after earlier negotiations.

In 1168, the Christian Danes destroyed the fortress in Garz, as well as the Svetovid temple in the fort at Cape Arkona. German settlers arrived from 1240 and the village of Garz emerged.

In 1316, Garz was given town rights (civitatis Gartz) by the Rügen prince, Vitslav III, and was first mentioned in 1316 and 1319. Thus it is considered to be the oldest town on the island. The 14th-century town church, St. Peter's, initially belonged to the Danish bishopric of Roskilde.

In 1325 Rügen, including Garz, went into Pomerania. In 1478, Rügen was united with Pomerania and, after the Thirty Years' War in 1648 the Treaty of Westphalia saw Garz falling to Sweden. It was not until 1815, as a result of the Congress of Vienna that Garz finally became a Prussian town.

Around 1648, the church steeple was destroyed in a storm and replaced with today's tower. In 1765 a large fire destroyed many homes. The older town houses, most of which are oriented with their longer side parallel to the road, were built after that. The town is dominated today, as in the past, by agriculture.

=== Modern times ===
In 1930, the diabetes researcher, Gerhardt Katsch, founded Germany's first home for the clinical and sociomedical treatment of diabetics in Garz. After the institution moved to Karlsburg in Vorpommern, an outpost of the Karlsburg Institute (Central Institute for Diabetes) remained in Garz as a holiday location for treating diabetic children over the summer holidays.

Since 1991, the centre of Garz has been extensively redeveloped as part of an urban development plan. Near Garz, Deutsche Telekom has operated a transmission site since 1993.

=== Territorial ownership ===
From 1818 to 1952 Garz/Rügen belonged to the district of Rügen (Kreis Rügen, from 1939, Landkreis Rügen), from 1952 to 1955 to the district of Putbus (Kreis Putbus), from 1956 to Rügen again (Kreis Rügen, from 1990 a Landkreis), and, since 2011 to the district of Vorpommern-Rügen.

On 1 January 2001 Groß Schoritz was incorporated into the town of Garz/Rügen. On 13 June 2004, Zudar, on the peninsula of the same name, followed suit. In January 2005, Karnitz was also added to Garz.

== Politics ==
=== Town council ===
Following the local elections of 7 June 2009 the following seats were allocated:

- Garz Free Voters' Association (Freie Wählergemeinschaft Garz) 6 seats
- Christian Democrats 3 seats
- The Left 1 seat
- Free Democrats 1 seat
- Independent 1 seat

=== Coat of arms ===
The coat of arms was registered as no. 34 in the coat of arms roll of Mecklenburg-Vorpommern.

=== Flag ===
The town flag has three vertical stripes: blue - white - blue. The blue stripes each occupy a quarter of the flag, the white stripe fills the central two quarters of its length. In the middle of the centre stripe is the town coat of arms, the ratio of the height of the shield to the height of the flag being 3:5. The overall ratio of the flag is 2:3.

=== Twinning ===
Garz's twin town of Norderney lies in East Frisia and is one of the East Frisian Islands off the coast of Lower Saxony. The towns were twinned immediately after the reunification of Germany in 1990.

== Culture and sights ==
- The Evangelical town church of St. Peter's, was built in the mid-14th century in the Gothic style using brick. Its two eastern bays were added in the 15th and 16th centuries. Around 1648 the spire was destroyed in a storm and replaced by the present flat-topped tower.
- Ernst Moritz Arndt birthplace in the village of Groß Schoritz
- The Slavic burgwall, whose three temples were destroyed in 1168, is one of the best preserved in Germany.
- The older town houses, mainly sideways on to the road, date exclusively to the period after the great town fire of 1765: Lindenstraße 1-2 and 4, vicarage, Wenden Str. 17, Langestr. 13
- In the vicinity of Garz, Deutsche Telekom has operated since 1993 a transmission site for VHF, TV and microwave radio relay. The antenna carrier is a 190-metre-high, guyed, steel lattice mast (see also: Broadcast transmission sites on Rügen). The facility is the main transmitter for the area of Rügen and Stralsund. Programmes are broadcast by the NDR and private broadcasters.
- The Ernst Moritz Arndt Museum is dedicated to the poet of that name born in the area.

== Economy and infrastructure ==
=== Transport ===
The town has a well-built network of cycle paths with a total length of about 42.5 kilometres.

== Notable people ==
=== Sons and daughters of the town ===
- Johann Christian Ludwig Hellwig (1743–1831), a German mathematician and entomologist
- Ernst Moritz Arndt (1769 at Gross Schoritz – 1860), a nationalist historian, writer and poet.
- Charlotte Pistorius (1777–1850), a German poet and letter-writer; died in Garz.
- Friedrich Otto Büttner (1824–1880), an entomologist who specialised in Lepidoptera

== Literature ==
- Gustav Kratz: Die Städte der Provinz Pommern - Abriß ihrer Geschichte, zumeist nach Urkunden. Berlin, 1865, pp. 154–156 (Full text).
