= Ummanz (municipality) =

- Municipality
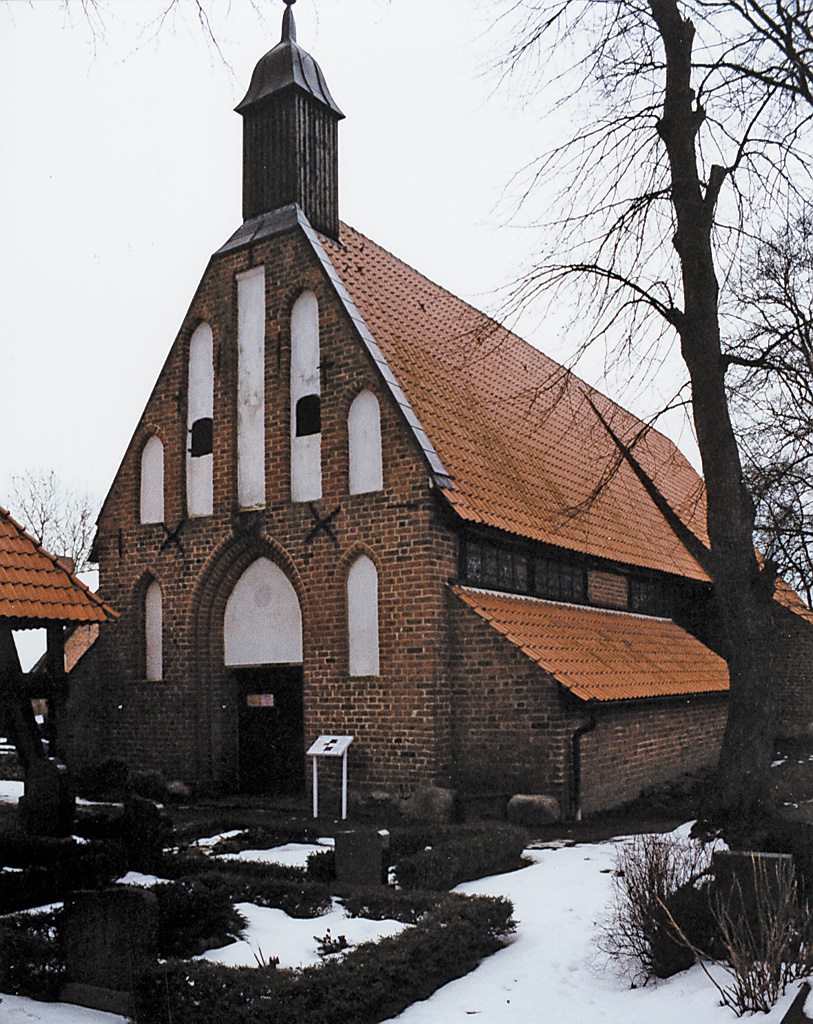
- Church

- Coat of arms

- Location of Ummanz within Vorpommern-Rügen district
- Interactive map of Ummanz
- Location within Germany Location within Mecklenburg-Vorpommern
- Coordinates: 54°28′N 13°11′E
- Country: Germany
- State: Mecklenburg-Vorpommern
- District: Vorpommern-Rügen
- Municipal assoc.: West-Rügen

Government
  - Mayor: Ernst-August Lange

Area
  - Total: 43.09 km^{2} (16.64 sq mi)
- Elevation: 1–12 m (3.3–39.4 ft)

Population (2025-12-31)
  - Total: 563
  - Density: 13.1/km^{2} (33.8/sq mi)
- Time zone: UTC+01:00 (CET)
  - Summer (DST): UTC+02:00 (CEST)
- Postal codes: 18569
- Dialling codes: 038305
- Vehicle registration: RÜG

Ummanz (German pronunciation: [ˈʊmants]) is a municipality in the Vorpommern-Rügen district, in Mecklenburg-Vorpommern, Germany.
