= Nonnensee =

Lake in Germany

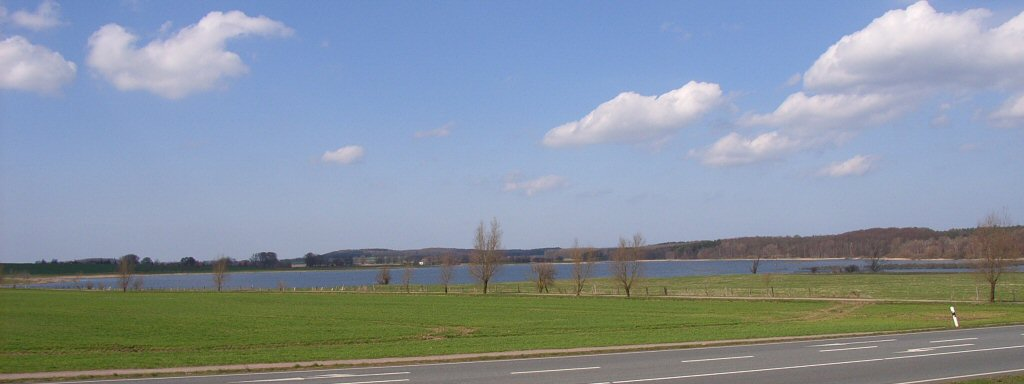

- Location within Mecklenburg-Vorpommern
- Location: Mecklenburg-Vorpommern
- Coordinates: 54°26′2″N 13°24′50″E
- Primary outflows: Duwenbeek
- Basin countries: Germany
- Surface area: 0.7 km^{2} (0.27 sq mi)
- Surface elevation: 16.1 m (53 ft)

The Nonnensee is a lake in the borough of Bergen auf Rügen, Vorpommern-Rügen district, in the German state of Mecklenburg-Vorpommern. It is located northwest of the town of Bergen auf Rügen and is very shallow. As a result, attempts were made as early as 1859/60 to drain it for agricultural land. In about 1970, the lake was artificially drained. In 1993, the pumping station was shut and the lake restored. Only a few tree stumps that jut out of the water indicate that it was temporarily dry land. The lake is part of the protected area known as the North Rügen Bodden and Nonnensee (Nordrügensche Bodden und Nonnensee) and is a breeding place and sanctuary for many bird species as well as a recreation area for the nearby town. A five-kilometre long path runs around the lake with benches and two bird hides from which bird life can be observed.

The lake lies at an elevation of 16.1 metres and has a surface area of 0.7 km^{2}.
