= Samtens =

- Municipality
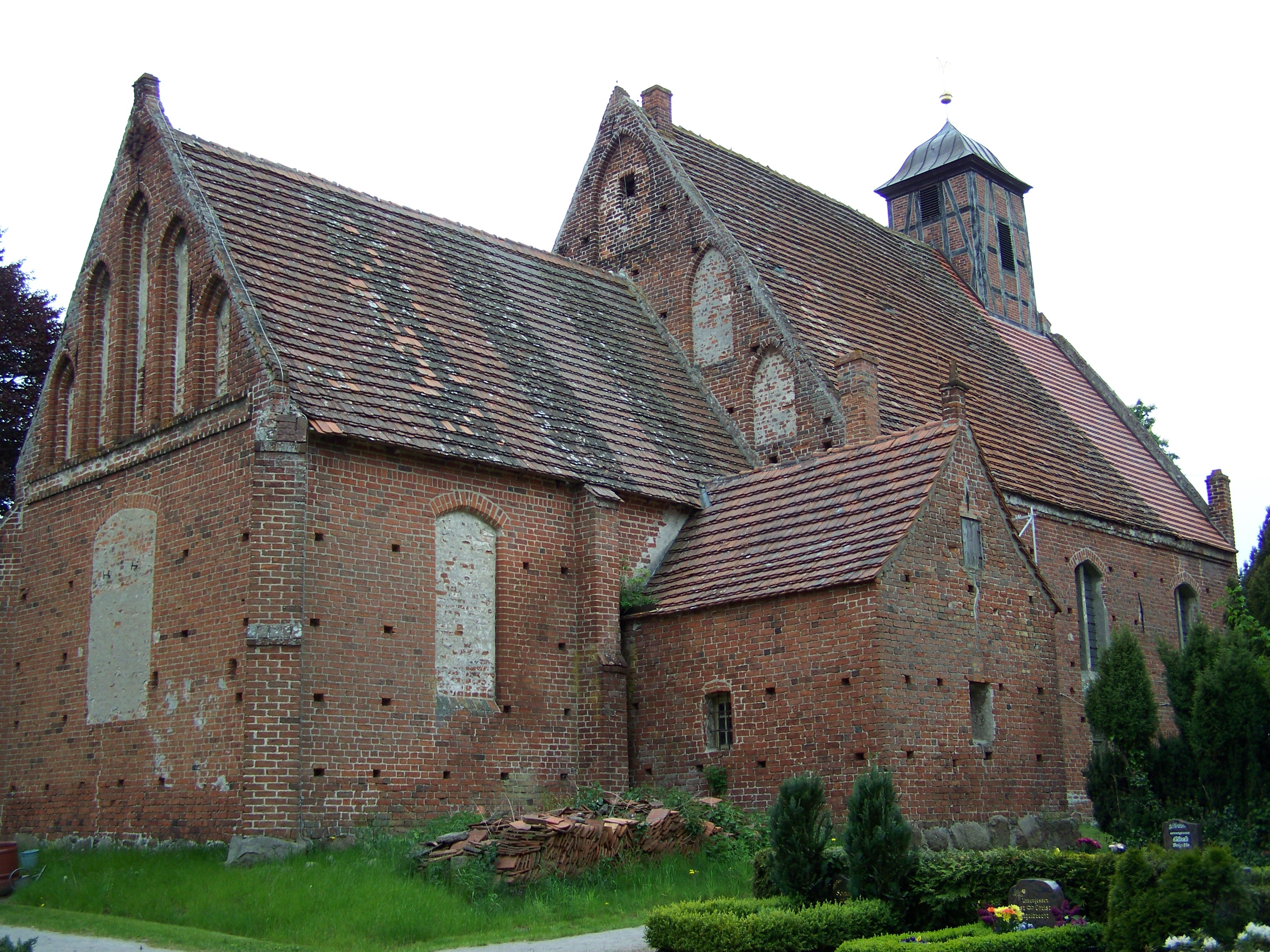
- Church of Samtens

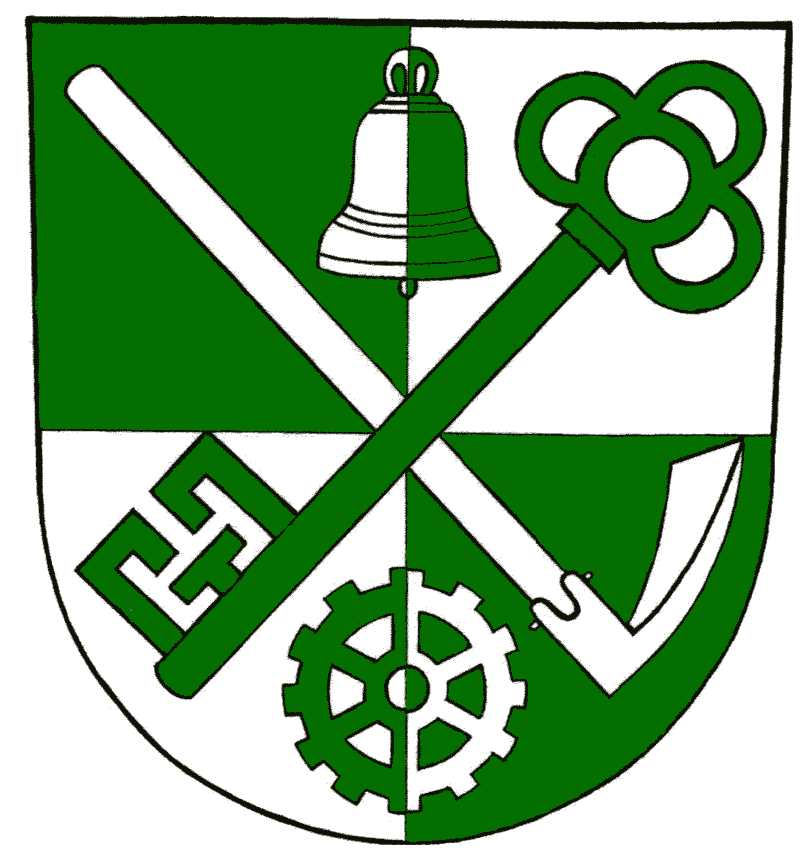
- Coat of arms

- Location of Samtens within Vorpommern-Rügen district
- Interactive map of Samtens
- Location within Germany Location within Mecklenburg-Vorpommern
- Coordinates: 54°21′N 13°16′E
- Country: Germany
- State: Mecklenburg-Vorpommern
- District: Vorpommern-Rügen
- Municipal assoc.: West-Rügen

Government
  - Mayor: Karin Wodrich

Area
  - Total: 32.44 km^{2} (12.53 sq mi)
- Elevation: 7 m (23 ft)

Population (2025-12-31)
  - Total: 2,004
  - Density: 61.78/km^{2} (160.0/sq mi)
- Time zone: UTC+01:00 (CET)
  - Summer (DST): UTC+02:00 (CEST)
- Postal codes: 18573
- Dialling codes: 038306
- Vehicle registration: RÜG

Samtens is a municipality in the Vorpommern-Rügen district, in Mecklenburg-Vorpommern, Germany.
