= Rambin =

- Municipality
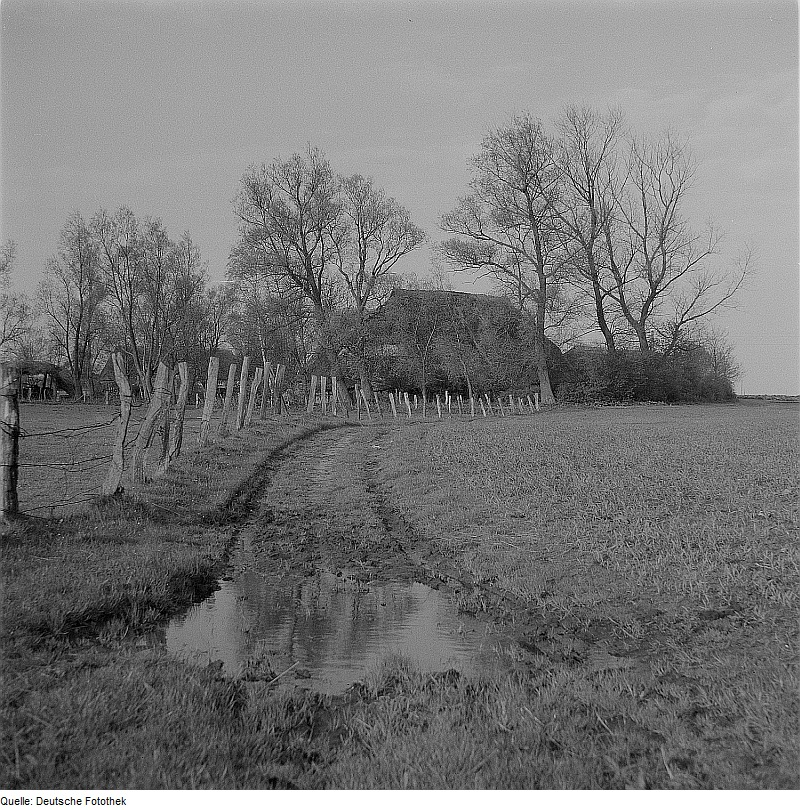
- A 1963 photograph by Richard Peter of windbreak trees around rural buildings

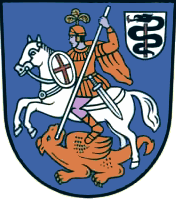
- Coat of arms

- Location of Rambin within Vorpommern-Rügen district
- Interactive map of Rambin
- Location within Germany Location within Mecklenburg-Vorpommern
- Coordinates: 54°21.300′N 13°12.280′E
- Country: Germany
- State: Mecklenburg-Vorpommern
- District: Vorpommern-Rügen
- Municipal assoc.: West-Rügen

Government
  - Mayor: Christian Thiede

Area
  - Total: 31.43 km^{2} (12.14 sq mi)
- Elevation: 5 m (16 ft)

Population (2025-12-31)
  - Total: 925
  - Density: 29.4/km^{2} (76.2/sq mi)
- Time zone: UTC+01:00 (CET)
  - Summer (DST): UTC+02:00 (CEST)
- Postal codes: 18573
- Dialling codes: 038306
- Vehicle registration: RÜG
- Website: Amt Westrügen

Rambin is a municipality in the Vorpommern-Rügen district, in Mecklenburg-Vorpommern, Germany.
