= Poseritz =

- Municipality
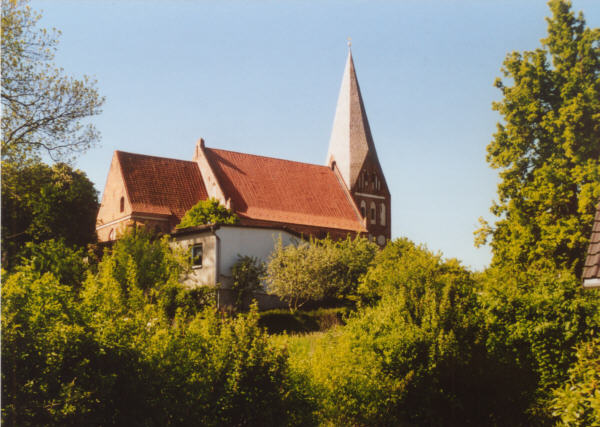
- Saint Mary Church

- Location of Poseritz within Vorpommern-Rügen district
- Interactive map of Poseritz
- Location within Germany Location within Mecklenburg-Vorpommern
- Coordinates: 54°17′N 13°16′E
- Country: Germany
- State: Mecklenburg-Vorpommern
- District: Vorpommern-Rügen
- Municipal assoc.: Bergen auf Rügen

Government
  - Mayor: Hans Lange

Area
  - Total: 40.17 km^{2} (15.51 sq mi)
- Elevation: 22 m (72 ft)

Population (2025-12-31)
  - Total: 959
  - Density: 23.9/km^{2} (61.8/sq mi)
- Time zone: UTC+01:00 (CET)
  - Summer (DST): UTC+02:00 (CEST)
- Postal codes: 18574
- Dialling codes: 038304, 038307
- Vehicle registration: RÜG

Poseritz is a municipality in the Vorpommern-Rügen district, in Mecklenburg-Vorpommern, Germany. The translator Christian Pistorius was born in Poseritz.
