= Lietzow–Binz railway =

Railway line in Germany

Lietzow (Rügen)–Ostseebad Binz
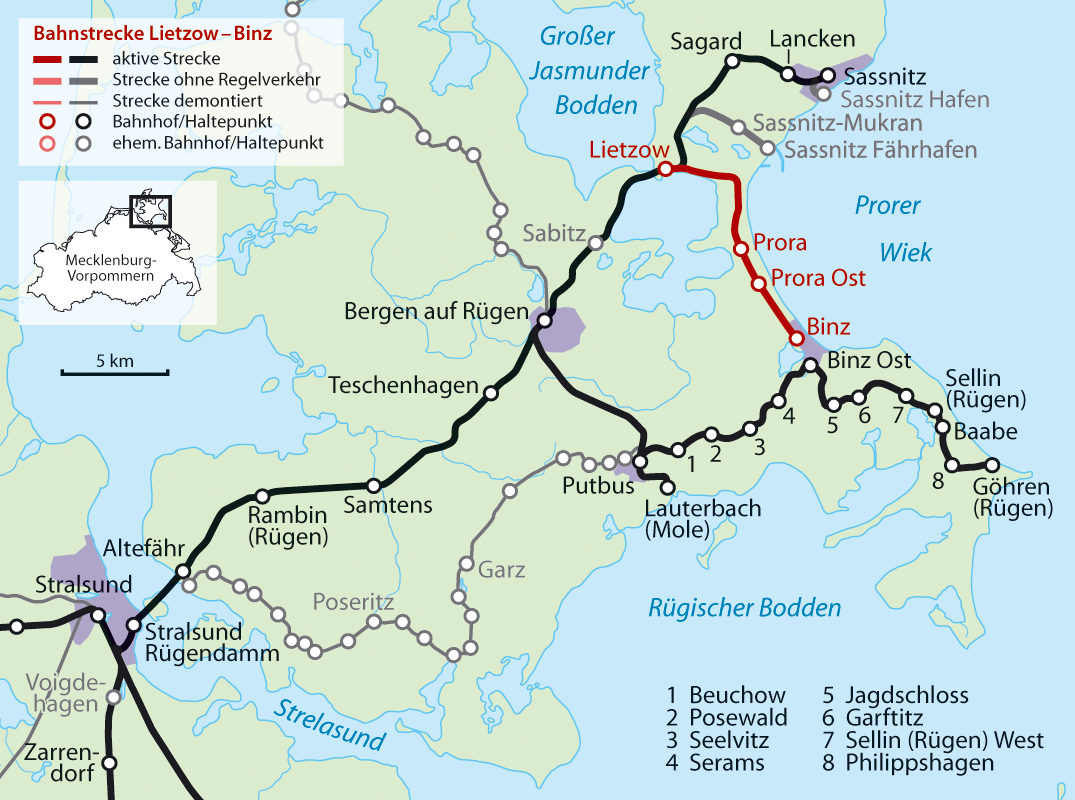
- Route of the Lietzow–Binz railway

Overview
- Line number: 6776

Service
- Route number: 190

Technical
- Line length: 12.1 km (Line class: mainly D4)
- Track gauge: 1435 mm
- Electrification: 15 kV 16.7 Hz AC

Lietzow and Binz railway is a single track, electrified branch line on the German Baltic Sea island of Rügen in the state of Mecklenburg-Vorpommern. It is mainly used by local and long-distance passenger services.

== Route description ==
The line branches off at the Lietzow (Rügen) station on the Stralsund–Sassnitz railway. It then runs eastward along the northern shore of Kleiner Jasmunder Bodden lagoon. It then swings south and, later, southeast, on a neck of land between the Kleiner Jasmunder Bodden and the Baltic. Parallel to the railway line, between it and the sea, is the four and a half kilometre long complex of Prora. The line ends at the station of Binz at the northern edge of the village. The station is known locally as the "Big Station" (Großer Bahnhof), in contrast to the small station in the south of the village.

== History ==
Until the 1930s there was only an isolated railway network on the island of Rügen. This comprised two standard gauge tracks, the line from Altefähr to Sassnitz and the line that branched off in Bergen to Lauterbach. The completion of the Rügen Causeway in 1936 meant that, from then on, the island of Rügen could be directly accessed by train. By contrast, the onward journey to Binz, the largest seaside resort on Rügen, and to the other resorts in the southeast of the island, was complicated by having to change in Bergen auf Rügen and Putbus to the narrow gauge line of the Rügen Light Railway. In addition, the resort for the Strength through Joy (KDF) organization was built in the second half of the 1930s north of Binz, where 20,000 people were to be accommodated. To connect that and to improve services to Binz, a line was built from Lietzow station to Binz and inaugurated on 15 May 1939. By 1938 the station building in Binz was finished. There were plans for an extension of the route along the coast to Thiessow, as well as the replacement of the narrow gauge railway from Putbus with a standard gauge track. These did not come to fruition due to the outbreak of World War II. The KDF complex was never completed; holiday traffic was not part of the war effort. In 1940, only two pairs of trains ran per day. After the war, the track was initially dismantled as war reparations to the Soviets. But by 1952 it was back in service. A new halt was built in Prora East.

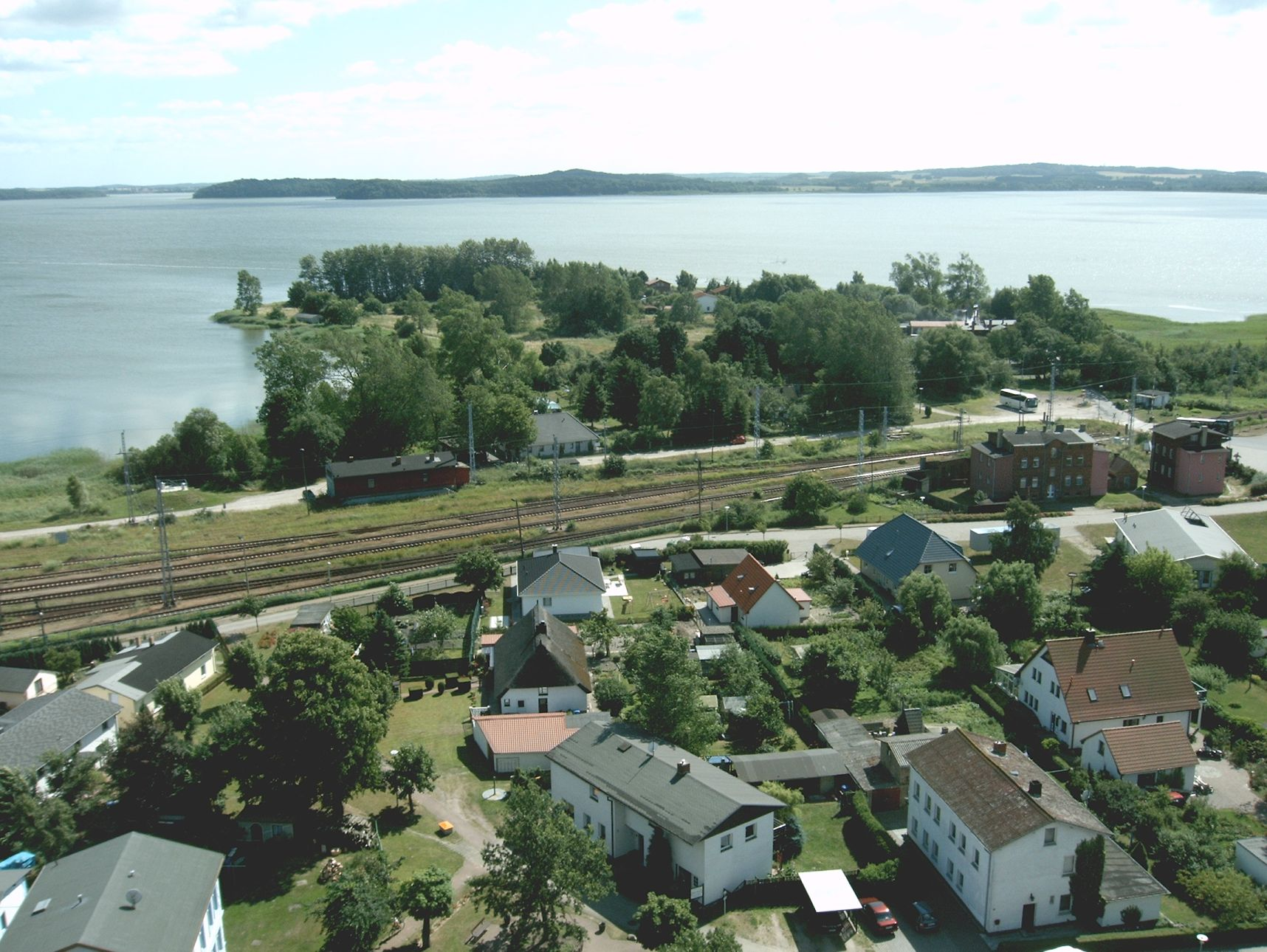
Track facilities ast Lietzow station

Binz benefited as Rügen's role as a tourist destination grew. This also increased the importance of the line again. Prora was a military out-of-bounds area in GDR times and large barracks were set up using the KdF blocks. Accordingly, the railway line became important for military traffic. Several express trains (D-Züge) bringing conscripts stopped at Prora. Depending on the summer timetable, up to six pairs of express trains ran. They connected Binz, to places such as Berlin, Leipzig, Dresden, Erfurt, and, in the late 1980s, even Bratislava. Local passenger services were also relatively frequent; for example, in 1988 a total of twelve pairs of trains operated.

Despite its importance, thanks to its high traffic density, the line remained, operationally, just a branch line. Together with the Sassnitz and Stralsund railway, and the connexion to the Mukran Ferry Port, the line was electrified. Electrical services began on 27 May 1989.

In 1991, the route was connected to the Deutsche Bahn's Intercity network using IC train "Rügen". Long-distance services were restructured several times, the basic services on the line changed little, however. The number of commuter trains was reduced somewhat in the early 1990s. Several early and late connexions, among other things, were dropped on the closure of the Army barracks at Prora. In the late 1990s, capacity was gradually increased during the day by moving to an hourly timetable.

== Train services ==
Local passenger rail services run hourly, the line being worked by Regional Express Line No. 9 (Regionalexpresslinie 9). Trains run alternately to Lietzow (with connexions to the Sassnitz-Rostock-Stralsund services) and to Stralsund. Three to five pairs of long-distance services run daily, most going to Rostock via Berlin to west or south Germany. At weekends, there is a direct Eurocity connexion to Prague.
