= Gingst =

- Municipality
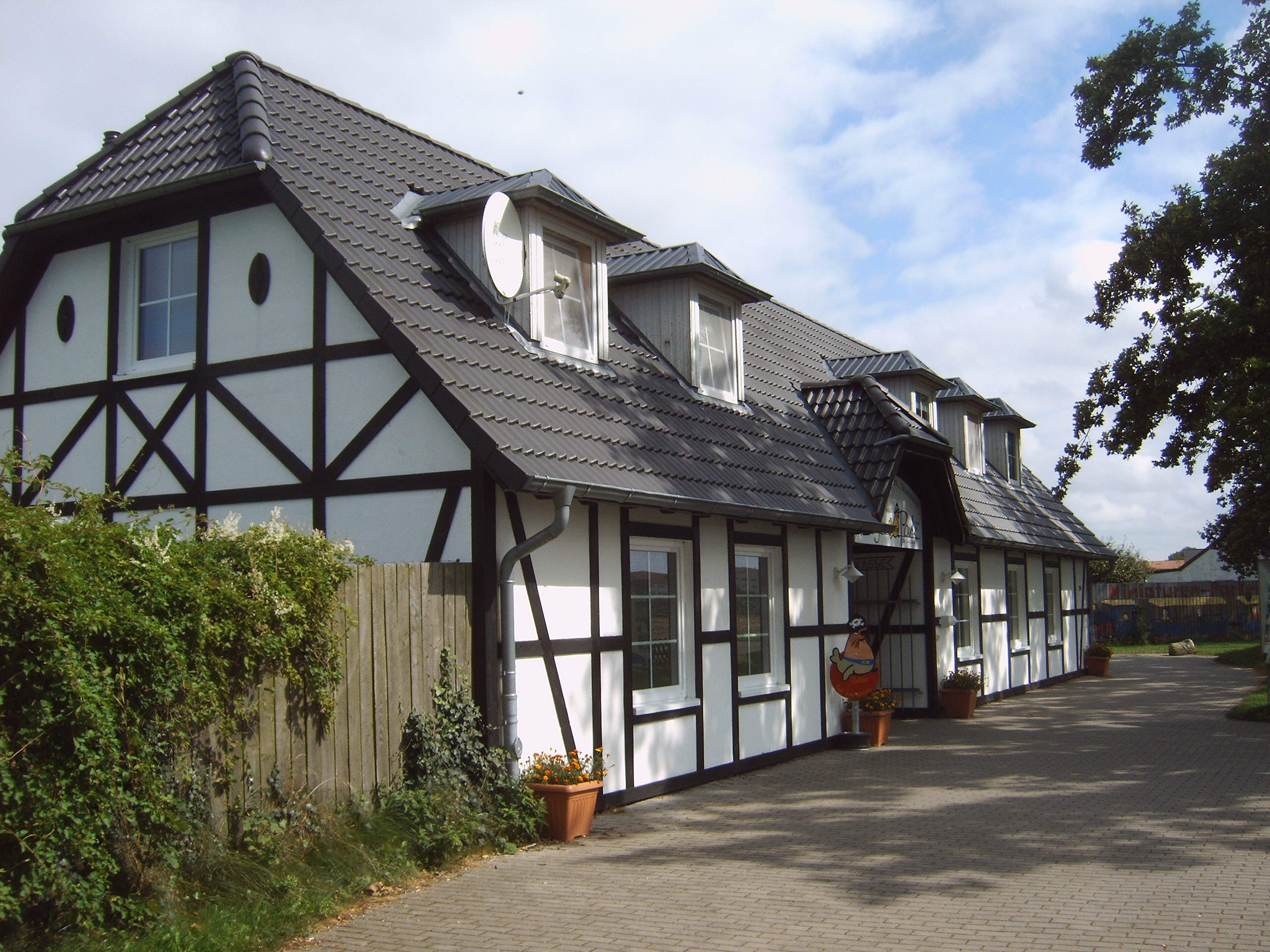
- Entrance of Rügenpark in Gingst

- Location of Gingst within Vorpommern-Rügen district
- Interactive map of Gingst
- Location within Germany Location within Mecklenburg-Vorpommern
- Coordinates: 54°27′N 13°15′E
- Country: Germany
- State: Mecklenburg-Vorpommern
- District: Vorpommern-Rügen
- Municipal assoc.: West-Rügen

Government
  - Mayor: Jürgen Briese

Area
  - Total: 21.66 km^{2} (8.36 sq mi)
- Elevation: 6 m (20 ft)

Population (2025-12-31)
  - Total: 1,258
  - Density: 58.08/km^{2} (150.4/sq mi)
- Time zone: UTC+01:00 (CET)
  - Summer (DST): UTC+02:00 (CEST)
- Postal codes: 18569
- Dialling codes: 038305
- Vehicle registration: RÜG
- Website: http://www.amt-westruegen.de/

Gingst is a municipality in the Vorpommern-Rügen district, in Mecklenburg-Vorpommern, Germany.
