= Udarser Wiek =

Bay in Germany

Coordinates: 54°29′N 13°12′E

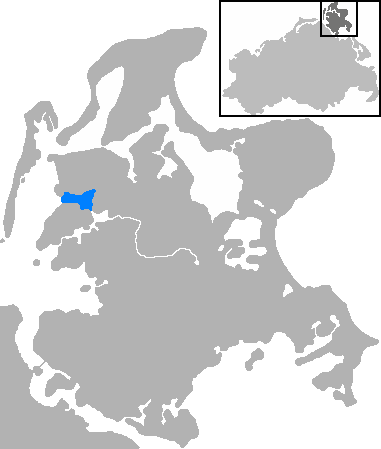
The Udarser Wiek

The Udarser Wiek is a bay on Germany's Baltic Sea coast, covering an area of about 8 km^{2}, between the islands of Rügen in the north and Ummanz in the south. In the west, the bodden transitions into the Schaproder Bodden and in the southeast to the Gahlitz in the lake of Koselower See. At the northeast end of the bay lies the island of Öhe.

The Udarser Wiek is very shallow (generally below 1.5 metres deep).

The bay was named after the village of Udars in the municipality of Schaprode on Rügen. The bodden is part of the Western Pomerania Lagoon Area National Park and it belongs to the West Rügen Bodden.

== Literature ==
- Harald Krause: Wiek und Wikinger – Entstehung und Entwicklung der Schifffahrt und maritimer Begriffe der Seefahrer im erweiterten Ostseeraum. In: Stier und Greif. Blätter zur Kultur- und Landesgeschichte in Mecklenburg-Vorpommern. 19th year, Schwerin 2009, pp. 10–21. Table: Die deutschen Wieken.
