= Schmale Heide =

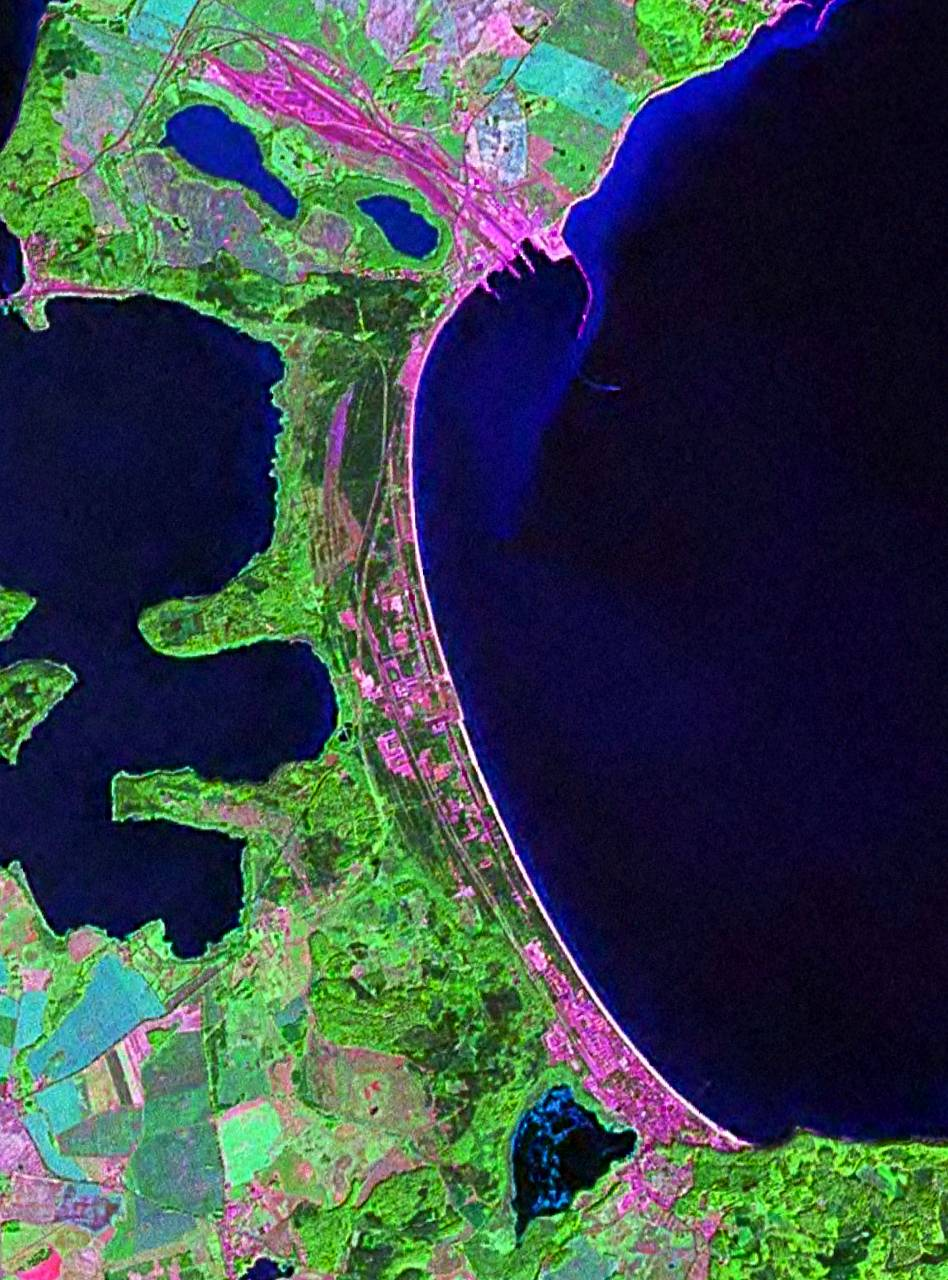
Satellite photograph of the Schmale Heide with the Sassnitz Ferry Port in the north and the Baltic Sea resort of Binz in the south

The Schmale Heide (German pronunciation: [ˈʃmaːlə ˈhaɪdə], lit. 'Narrow Heath') is a 9.5-kilometre-long and roughly 2-kilometre-wide bar between the Baltic seaside resort of Binz and the village of Neu Mukran near Sassnitz on the German island of Rügen. It lies in the municipality of Binz and is bounded to the northwest by the lagoon of the Kleiner Jasmunder Bodden and to the east by the bay of Prorer Wiek.

== Formation ==
The shape of the heavily segmented coastline of Rügen was the result of interplay between variations in the mean sea level and rebound processes following the last ice age, the Weichselian glaciation.

It is believed that the region of the present-day West Pomeranian Baltic Sea coast after the last ice age glacial advance (the North Rügen-East Usedom Step) has remained ice-free and largely part of the mainland for about 13,000 years. The level of the world's oceans was once lower than today due to the ice age. About 9,000 years ago, a meltwater lake, the Ancylus Lake, was formed, whose surface lay no higher than 8 metres below the present-day level (Normalnull), but after a period of about 1,000 years this drained, rapidly at times, into the world's oceans, which led to a renewed mainland phase, the Ancylus transgression. Not until 8,000 years ago – after a general rise in worldwide sea levels – did the level of water in the Baltic Sea basin climb rapidly again, by around 15 metres, after the flooding of the land bridge between Denmark and Scandinavia to form the Litorina Sea, reaching almost its present level about 5,500 years ago.

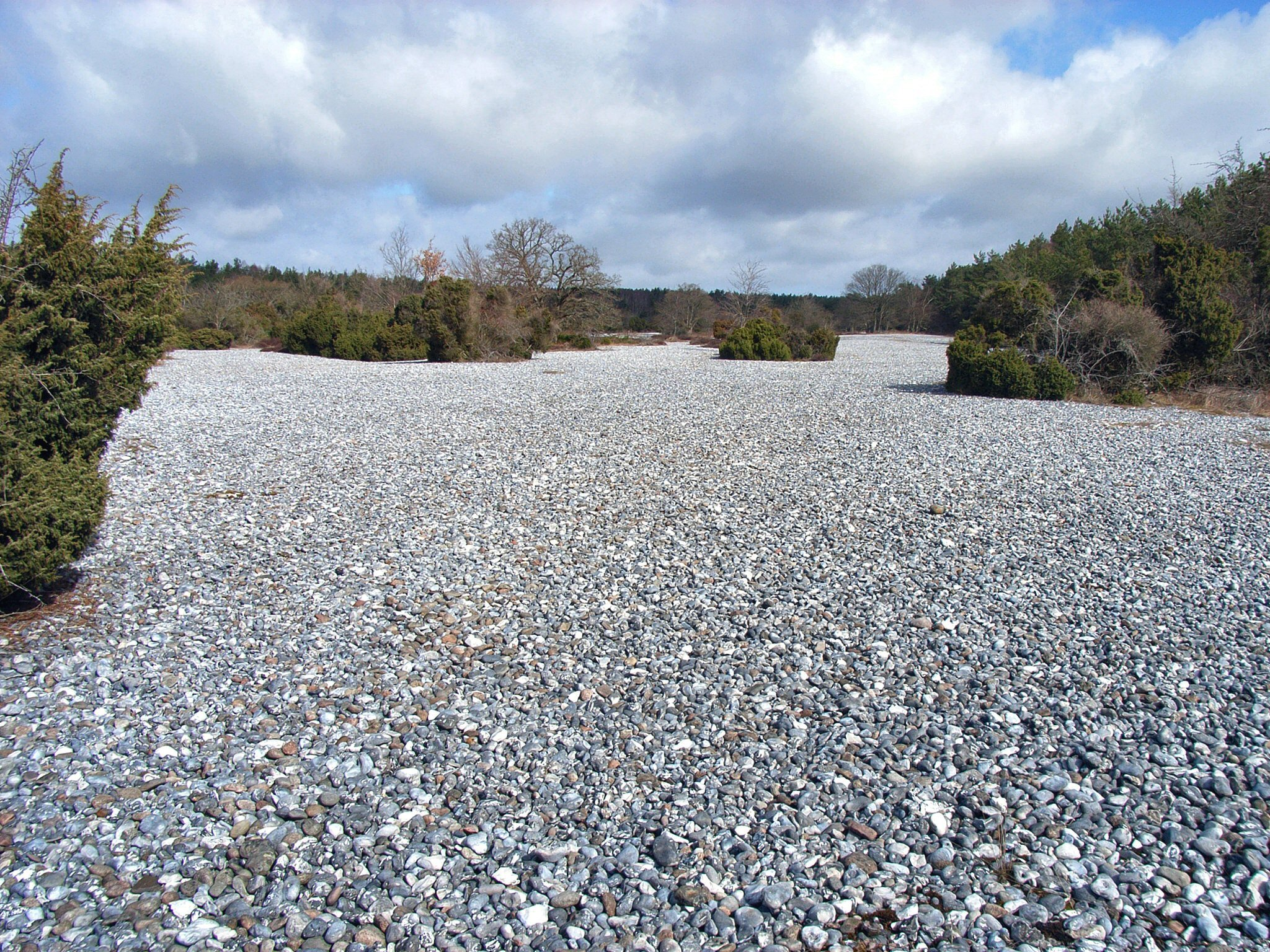
Flint fields near Neu Mukran

Since that time the sea level has varied by only around 1–2 metres and a process of coastal equalisation (Küstenausgleichsprozess) began that continues to the present day. In particular, the coastal cliffs of Rügen have been eroded by breakers and sea currents and the sediments dumped sand and gravel between the island cores as bars and spits.

The Schmale Heide lies in an old glacial snout lake (Gletscherzungenbecken) between the island cores of Jasmund and Granitz. As geological bores near Prora in the middle of the spit have shown, the waves of the Ancylus Lake had already laid an 11 metre thick layer of sediment that was later increased again by a further 10 metres by the Litorina Sea. During this process, one beach was deposited after another, which is how the spit of the Schmale Heide reaches its present width of about 2 kilometres. During intermediate phases the currents and waves deposited material – in thicker layers than today – made of flint nodules (paramoudra) which were washed from the chalk cliff of the Jasmund Peninsula. This led to the formation of the unique flint fields near Neu Mukran in the north of the Schmale Heide, that have been placed under conservation protection since 1935.

== Nature reserves ==
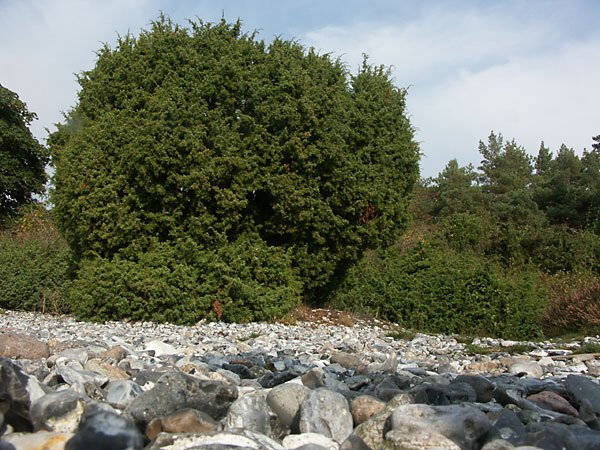
View over the flint fields

The conservation aim of the Schmale Heath and Flint Fields nature reserve focuses mainly on the preservation of approximately 14 open flint ridges covering an area of 2000 x 200 metres. To suppress the spread of vegetation here, parts of the flint fields were fenced in as early as the mid-19th century and populated with game in order to keep the vegetation down after the Schmale Heide was afforested with pine in 1840. From the mid-1970s to early 1990s, this was tried again using European mouflon. Currently, the flint fields are accessible across their entire extent.

East of the flint fields in 1994, a new nature reserve, the Schmale Heath and Flint Fields - Extension was created, which protects the dune area near the beach where rare plants form part of the existing vegetation. Within this area visitors must keep to the signed routes to protect the sensitive dune vegetation.

== Influences on the landscape ==
The landscape of the Schmale Heide - in contrast to the Schaabe - has been strongly affected since the 1930s by the construction of the Nazi "Strength Through Joy" resort of Prora and subsequent decades of military use with its associated infrastructure. In addition to the 5-kilometre-long complex of buildings along the Prorer Wiek, which served in part as a barracks, large areas of the heath and the Prora, a wooded ridge in the southern part of the Schmale Heide, were used as military training areas and for the establishment of ammunition depots, hangars and workshops.

The beach on the Prorer Wiek which has become accessible again since the early 1990s has regained its popularity as a bathing beach.

== Literature ==
- Ralf-Otto Niedermeyer, Heinz Kliewe, Wolfgang Jahnke: Die Ostseeküste zwischen Boltenhagen und Ahlbeck – Ein geologischer und geomorphologischer Überblick mit Exkursionshinweisen. 1. Auflage. Hermann Haack/Goegraphisch-Kartographische Anstalt, Gotha 1987 (Geographische Bausteine, Heft 30), ISBN 3-7301-0633-3

54°26.190325′N 13°34.128113′E
