= Fährinsel =

Island in Mecklenburg-Vorpommern, Germany

Coordinates: 54°32′38″N 13°7′15″E

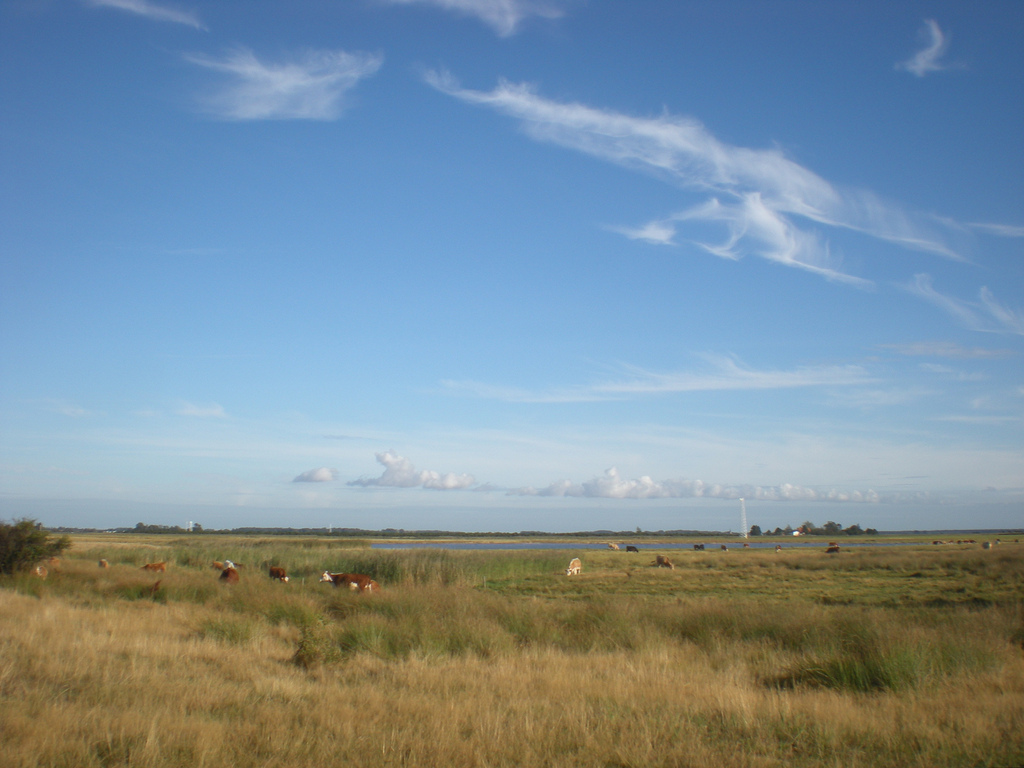
Fährinsel (background) seen from the west, September 2009

Fährinsel (German pronunciation: [ˈfɛːʁˌʔɪnzl̩]) is a small Baltic Sea island off the eastern shore of the island of Hiddensee and which belongs to the Insel Hiddensee municipality. It is separated from Hiddensee by the narrow Bäk, only 120 metres wide in places. It forms the western part of the border between the Schaproder Bodden and the Vitter Bodden. The island is 1.23 km long and up to 580 metres wide. It has an area of ca. 37 ha. Ferry services between Rügen and Hiddensee used to run via Fährinsel. It was closed in 1952 when the port at Schaprode was upgraded to handle mailboat services. Fährinsel is a nature reserve and out-of-bounds to visitors. It is a roosting place for thousands of birds and the grazing area for a herd of Gotland sheep.

== Geography ==
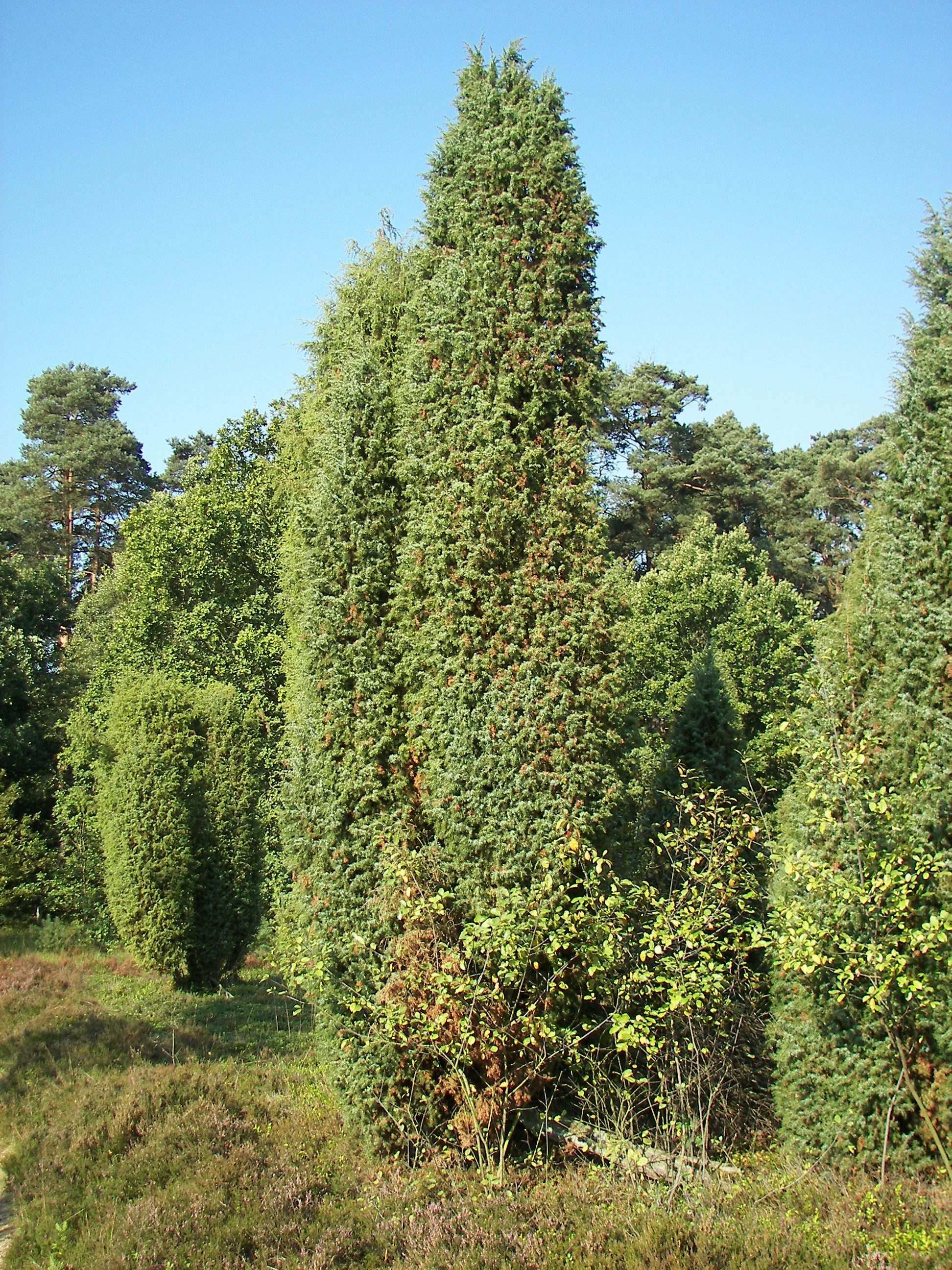
Juniper - a typical shrub on Fährinsel

Fährinsel consists of a fan of several berms, up to 2 metres high, and spits, as well as silted-up areas of the lagoon, the Schaproder Bodden.

About 12,500 years ago, during the last cold phase of the ice age, glacial ice masses piled up sand and gravel. When the ice retreated, the Dornbusch on Hiddensee, as well as two ridges of glacial till running westwards from Rügen, belonged to a vast Young Drift landscape in the southern Baltic Sea region. One ridge formed the heights of the island of Ummanz and the Gellen peninsula, another ran between Trent via the present Stolper Haken near Seehof northwards from Schaprode to the Fährinsel. Following the flooding of the region around Rügen and Hiddensee about 3,900 years ago, the aforementioned end moraines remained behind as islands. Not until much later (2,900 years ago) did abrasion begin, mainly as a result of breakers. Numerous spits and bars formed and Hiddensee was given its elongated shape. The block of till between Rügen and Fährinsel was eroded and, at some point, it must have been breached. When the remaining cliff section on the Fährinsel was abraded, southward running spits formed due to the currents from the northeast flowing past both sides of the northern tip of the island. The narrow bays, lagoons and runnels (Riegen) between the spits slowly filled with organic material and silted up.

Fährinsel is covered by a dense growth of juniper on the old berms. Between the berms an undergrowth of heather has developed. Reeds and salt meadow vegetation grows in the silted-up zones. In the lagoons, sedge and bog plants predominate. On the eastern shore of the island, a flint field, about 150 metres from north to south and about 20 metres wide, indicates that there was formerly a cliff here.

Of historical interest is a triangular set of ramparts in the southeast, the Swedish or Old Rampart (Schwedenschanze or Alte Schanze). This guarded the strait between the Stolper Haken and Fährinsel. At that time this was the first sea inlet on an approach from the north; the peninsula of Bug and the Bessin were not as long as they are today. At the Stolper Haken is a counterpart of the rampart on the Fährinsel.

Headlands on the Fährinsel are the Mövenort, no longer recognizable as a spit in the central region, and the Buschort, its southern tip. In the centre is a frequently-flooded salt meadow landscape, the Roschen, which is only 40 cm above the level of the Baltic Sea.

Off the island to the southeast is the island of Bullenriff, which measures only 85 by 80 metres, and is sometimes called Kuhwerder. The name indicates that it used to be intensively grazed. It is, like the Roschen, very flat and only covered by typical salt meadow vegetation.

== Bird world ==
Despite the loss of several breeding species (including oystercatchers and ruff, and reductions in the populations of others, Fährinsel still has high importance as a breeding area. This is partly due to the fact it remains out of bounds and partly because of its special landscape.

Shelduck nest between the juniper bushes nest and it is one of the most important breeding sites for red-breasted merganser in the Hiddensee area. On the Roschen there are breeding colonies of many black-headed, common and Mediterranean gulls. teal also breed here. The ruff is an example of the extinction of a bird species on Hiddensee. Even in the 19th century it still occurred in the salt meadows south of Kloster and on Fährinsel in stable numbers. But around 1940/1950 it died out as a result of egg stealing by foxes and people. The common tern and Sandwich tern, which until about 1970 occasionally bred here, are no longer seen.

Songbirds on the island include the skylark, white wagtail and red-backed shrike.

During migration periods between March and May and between September and November, waders and ducks gather in large numbers on the meadows and in the shallow bodden waters.

Despite its not very exposed location, Fährinsel is occasionally a stopover for various vagrants. Between 28 June and 10 July 1971 one to four gull-billed terns were observed and on 28 May 1985 an adult rosy starling from central Asia and Southeast Europe stayed on the island.

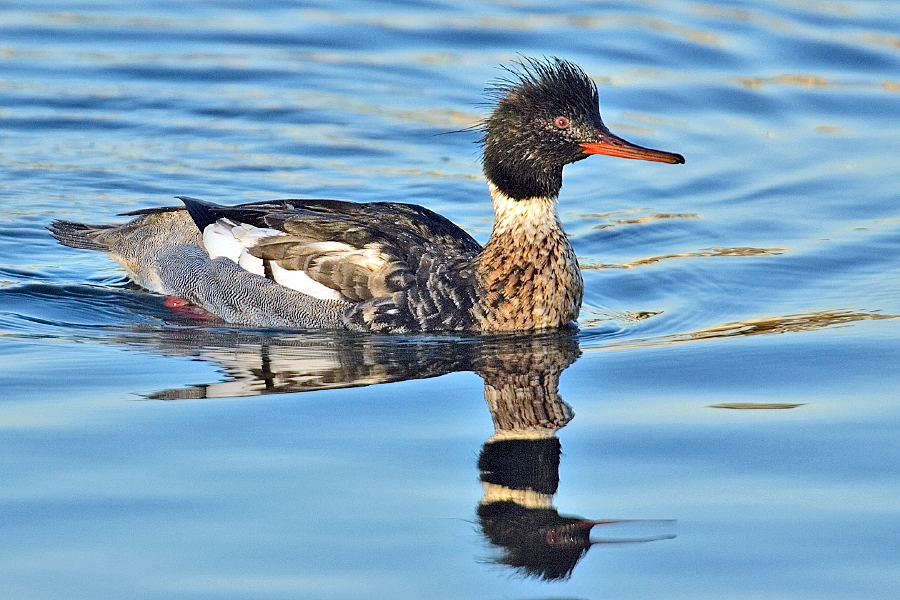
Male red-breasted merganser

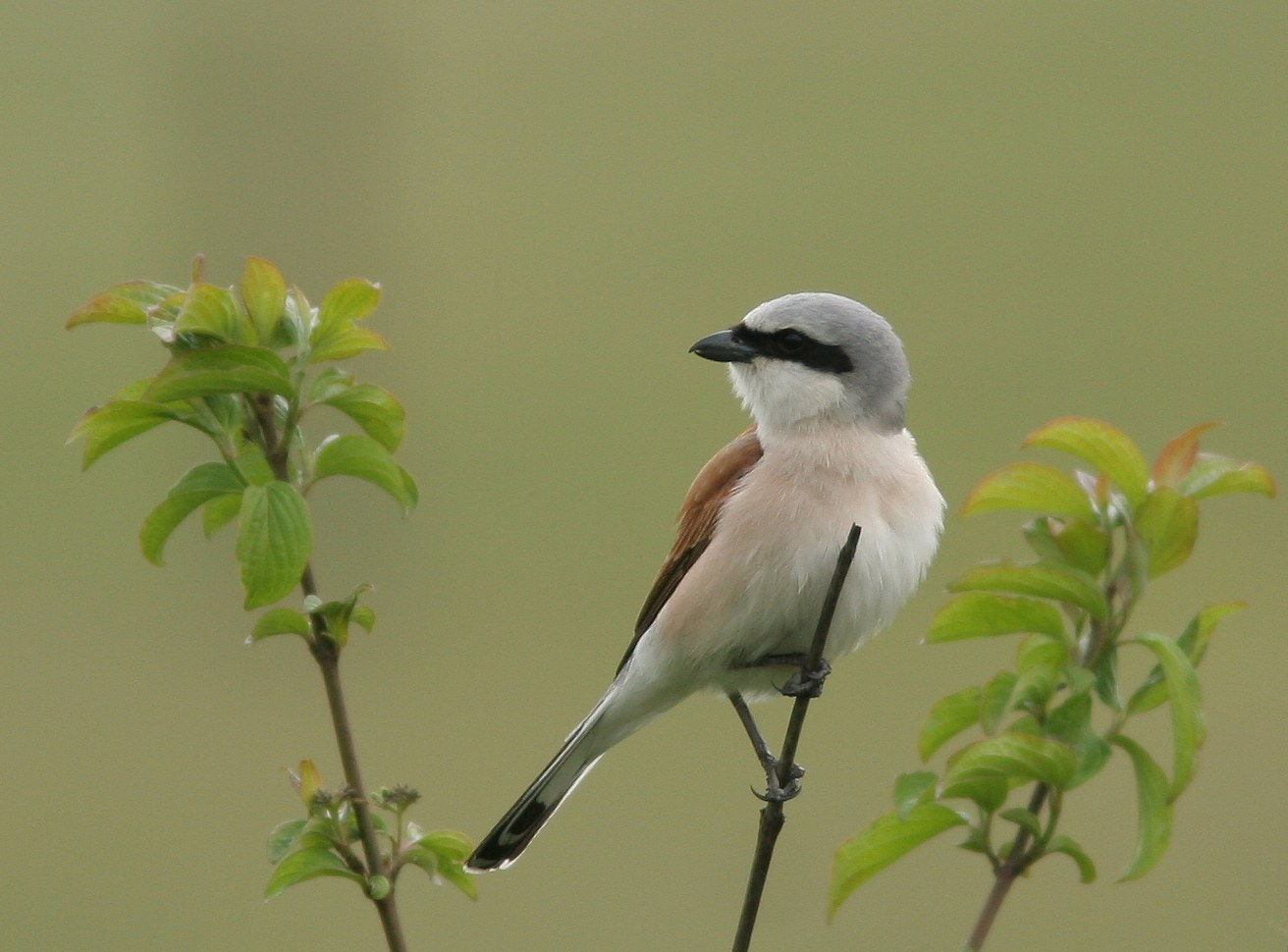
Red-backed shrike (male)

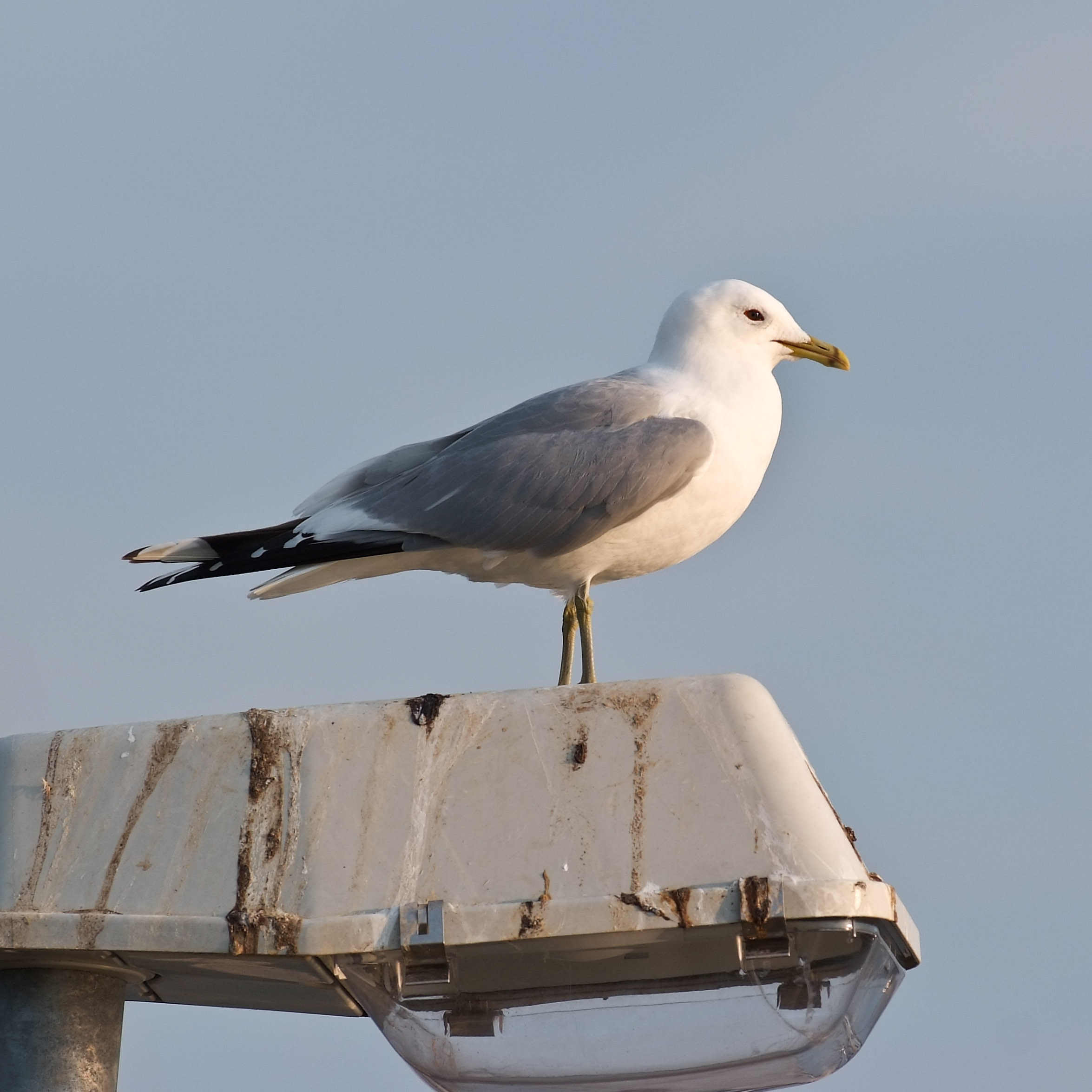
Common gull

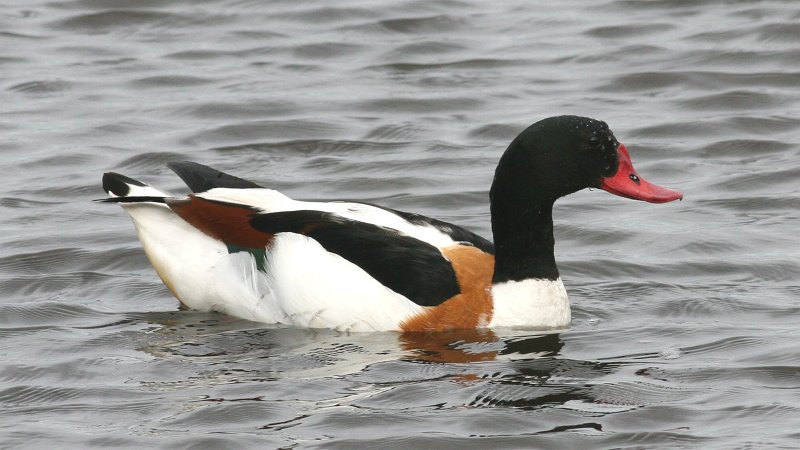
Shelduck

== Structures ==
On the island are several buildings on the western shore. In 1992, the Fährinsel experimental station of the Jena Central Institute of Microbiology and Experimental Therapy was established.

=== Literature ===
- Günter Möbus: Wie Hiddensee zur Insel wurde. Helms Verlag, Schwerin 2001, ISBN 3-931185-87-7.
- Karin Blase, Bernd Blase: Hiddensee A–Z. Demmler Verlag, 2008 (4. Auflage), ISBN 3-910150-16-0.
- Herbert Ewe: Hiddensee. VEB Hinstorff Verlag, Rostock 1983.
- Arved Jürgensohn: Hiddensee, das Capri von Pommern. Verlag von Karl Haertel, 1924 (2. Auflage).
- Erich Hoyer: Vogelführer Insel Hiddensee. Verlag u. Naturfotoarchiv, 1996, ISBN 3-929192-12-8.
- Hartmut Dittberner, Erich Hoyer: Die Vogelwelt der Inseln Rügen und Hiddensee – Teil I – Nonpasseres. Verlag Erich Hoyer, Galenbeck, 1993, ISBN 3-929192-02-0.
- Hartmut Dittberner, Erich Hoyer: Die Vogelwelt der Inseln Rügen und Hiddensee – Teil II – Singvögel. Verlag Erich Hoyer, Galenbeck, 1995, ISBN 3-929192-06-3.
