= Schaproder Bodden =

Lagoon in Germany

Coordinates: 54°30′N 13°08′E

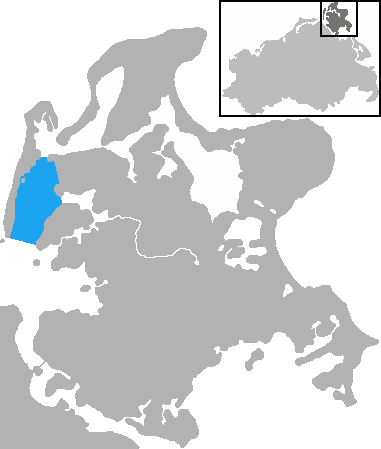
The Schaproder Bodden

The Schaproder Bodden is a bodden on the Baltic Sea coast between the island of Hiddensee in the west and the islands of Rügen and Ummanz in the east. To the north the Schaproder Bodden is linked to the Vitter Bodden by the so-called Trog between the Fährinsel and the Stolper Haken of Rügen island. To the south the bodden transitions into the Kubitzer Bodden. A boundary would be the line between the southern tips of the Hiddensee (Geller Haken) and Ummanz or the link from the Geller Haken - Insel Heuwiese.

The Schaproder Bodden is 4.5 metres deep at three places, otherwise it is very shallow (mostly under 1.5 metres deep). Another source claims water depts. of 6 m.

The bodden was named after Schaprode, the main village on its shores on the island of Rügen. The bodden is part of the Western Pomerania Lagoon Area National Park and it belongs to the West Rügen Bodden.

In the southwestern part the bodden runs in front of Hiddensee into a very low windwatt or wind-exposed mudflat. The islands in this bodden are the Gänsewerder, the Fährinsel and the Öhe.

Ferries to Hiddensee from Schaprode, Stralsund and Zingst cross the bodden.
