= Heuwiese =

Island in the Baltic Sea

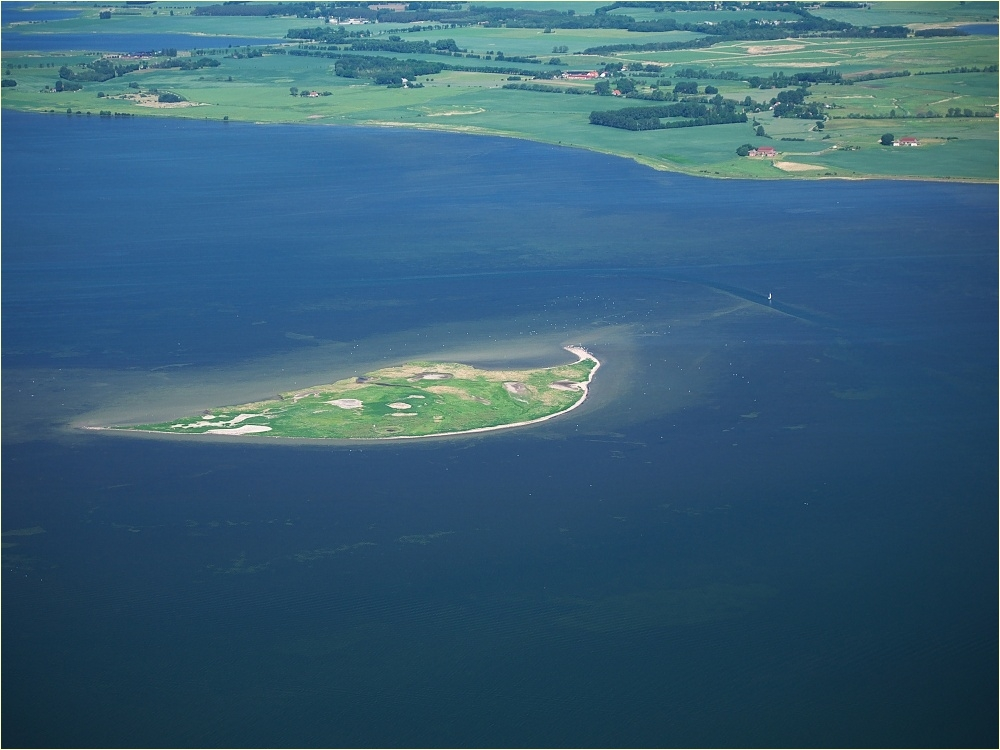
- Heuwiese

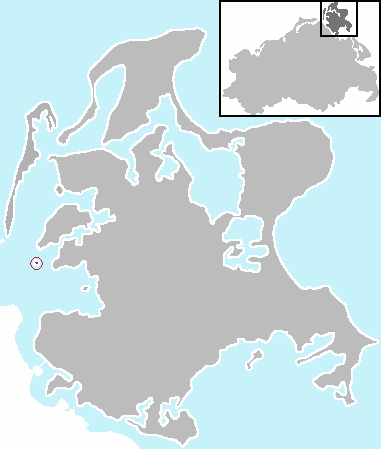
- Location of the island of Heuwiese near Rügen

Geography
- Location: Baltic Sea
- Coordinates: 54°25′41″N 13°7′10″E
- Area: 0.40 km^{2} (0.15 sq mi)
- Length: 0.900 km (0.5592 mi)

Administration
- Germany

Demographics
- Population: 0

Heuwiese (German pronunciation: [ˈhɔʏˌviːzə]) is an uninhabited German Baltic Sea island that lies about two kilometres south of Ummanz and west of Germany's largest island, Rügen.

It has a maximum extend of 900 metres (from northwest to southeast) and is about 40 hectares in area. The island, which is over 1 metre high is a bird reserve that lies within the West Pomerania Lagoon Area National Park.

The island is a typical salt grassland (Salzgrasland) of the West Pomeranian lagoon coastline and was formed from zones of sediment accretion that have gradually become exposed, known as windwatts. The resulting areas lie just a few centimetres about sea level (NN) and are flooded from time to time at irregular intervals.

The island received its name from its earlier use as cattle pasture. Since the mid-19th century it has also been known as a bird colony and was officially placed under protection in 1939 as a breeding site for coastal birds. In 2007 about 15 different species bred on Heuwiese (including four species of gull and several species of duck).

One feature are the breeding cormorants on the island that, despite being tree nesters, have built high nests on the ground here.
