= Urkevitz =

Uninhabited German island

Geography
- Location: Baltic Sea
- Coordinates: 54°27′56″N 13°13′11″E
- Length: 1 km (0.6 mi)
- Width: 0.3 km (0.19 mi)
- Highest elevation: 5 m (16 ft)

Administration
- Germany

Demographics
- Population: 0

Urkevitz (German pronunciation: [ˈʊʁkəvɪts]) is an uninhabited German island in the Baltic Sea. It lies in between the islands of Rügen and Ummanz and is less than 100 metres from the latter. The island is about 1,000 metres long, up to 300 metres wide and up to 5 metres above sea level. It is located in the Western Pomeranian Lagoon Area National Park.

Like its neighbouring islands, Liebes, Mährens and Wührens, it is a bird reserve. A bridge runs from Ummanz to Urkevitz, but the island is out-of-bounds to the public.
