= Mährens =

Uninhabited German island

Geography
- Location: Baltic Sea
- Coordinates: 54°27′56″N 13°12′20″E
- Length: 150 m (490 ft)
- Width: 100 m (300 ft)
- Highest elevation: 3 m (10 ft)

Administration
- Germany

Demographics
- Population: 0

Mährens (German pronunciation: [ˈmɛːʁəns]) is an uninhabited German island in the Baltic Sea. It lies between the islands of Rügen and Ummanz off the coast of Mecklenburg-Western Pomerania. It is around 150 by 100 metres in size and reaches just 3 metres above sea level.

Together with its two larger neighbours, Liebes and Urkevitz, as well as the smaller Wührens, the island lies within the Western Pomerania Lagoon Area National Park. The island is a bird reserve and access to the island is not permitted to unauthorised persons.
