= Öhe =

German island

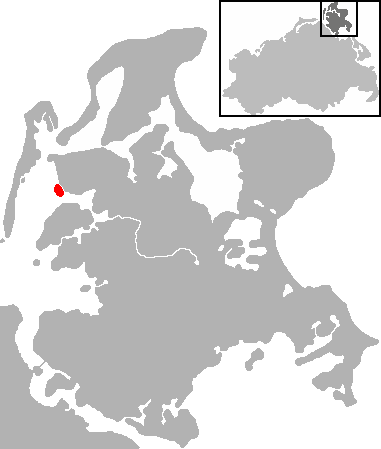
- Location of the island of Öhe

Geography
- Location: Baltic Sea
- Coordinates: 54°30′28″N 13°9′43″E
- Area: 0.72 km^{2} (0.28 sq mi)
- Highest elevation: 3.3 m (10.8 ft)
- Highest point: Fuchsberg

Administration
- Germany

Öhe (German pronunciation: [ˈøːə]) is an island in the Baltic Sea off the ferry port of Schaprode on Rügen, itself the largest island in Germany. The island of Öhe lies opposite Schaprode on Rügen between the lagoon of Schaproder Bodden and one of its bays, the Udarser Wiek, and is about 72 hectares in area. There is an individual farmstead on the island which has periodically fallen into disrepair and belongs to a Schilling family, who are probably descended from its owners in the 13th century. In 1990 the farmhouse was restored and is once again inhabited. The highest point on the island is the 3.3 metre high Fuchsberg.

The island was featured in an episode of "die nordstory" on NDR television in 2017.
