= Liebes =

Island in the Baltic Sea

Geography
- Location: Baltic Sea
- Coordinates: 54°27′39″N 13°12′02″E
- Length: 1 km (0.6 mi)
- Width: 0.2 km (0.12 mi)
- Highest elevation: 1.5 m (4.9 ft)

Administration
- Germany

Demographics
- Population: 0

Liebes (German pronunciation: [ˈliːbəs]) is a small, uninhabited island in the Baltic Sea, in the lagoon of Varbelvitzer Bodden between the islands of Rügen and Ummanz. It is a good 1,000 metres long, up to 200 metres wide and its highest point lies just 1.5 metres above sea level. The name of the island could be derived from the Slavic word lipa, meaning "lime tree".

Just like its three very small neighbours, Urkevitz, Mährens and Wührens, it lies within the West Pomeranian Lagoon Area National Park and, as a bird reserve, is out-of-bounds to unauthorised persons.
