= Gänsewerder =

Uninhabited island in the Baltic Sea

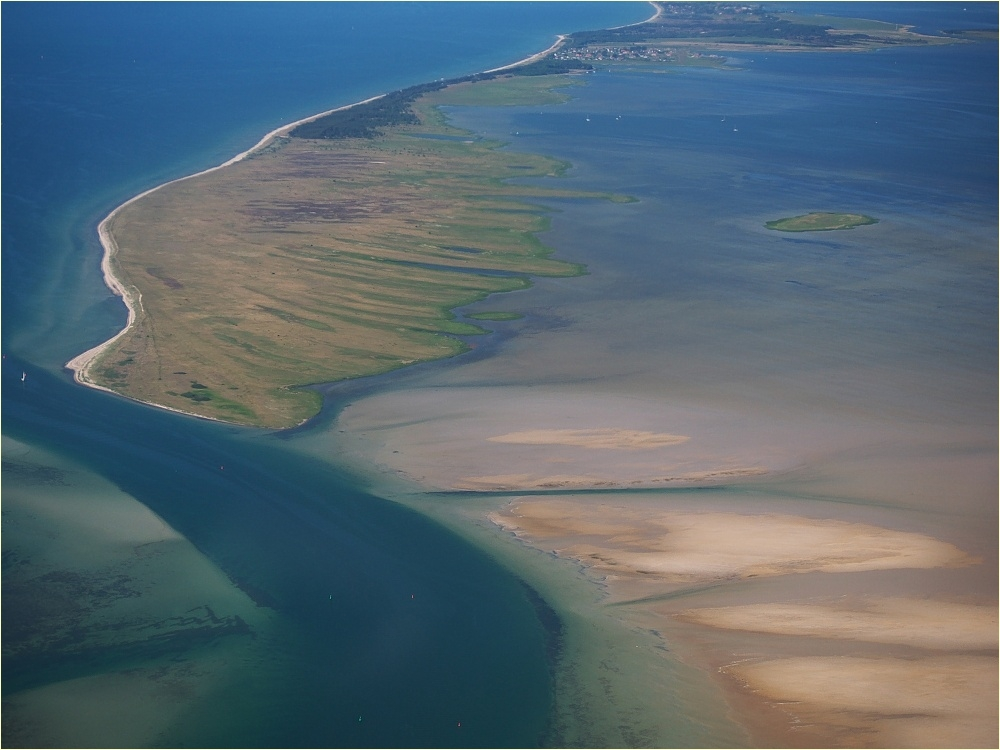
- The small island of Gänsewerder (middle of upper right quadrant) east of the Gellen Peninsula on Hiddensee

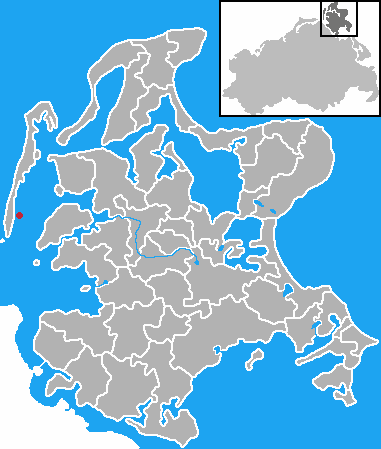
- Location of Gänsewerder in off Hiddensee and Rügen

Geography
- Location: Schaproder Bodden
- Coordinates: 54°28′32″N 13°04′54″E
- Area: 0.04 km^{2} (0.015 sq mi)
- Length: 0.328 km (0.2038 mi)
- Width: 0.155 km (0.0963 mi)

Administration
- Germany

Demographics
- Population: 0

Gänsewerder is a tiny uninhabited German island in the Schaproder Bodden, a lagoon on the Baltic Sea coast, 400 metres east of the Gellen Peninsula on Hiddensee. It is part of the Western Pomerania Lagoon Area National Park and is out of bounds to the public. The surface of Gänsewerder is flat, sandy and damp, and only reeds and small plants grow there. There is a small pond in the northeast of the island. The island has an oval shape and slopes along its longer axis from southwest to northeast. It measures about 328 by 155 metres and has an area of some 4 hectares. When the national park was established, Gänsewerder (like the Gellen) was a coastal nesting area for birds, but is no longer. The island of Fährinsel off Hiddensee, which is inhabited by several species of bird, is managed as one area along with the Gellen and Gänserwerder.
