= West Rügen Bodden =

Lagoon in Germany

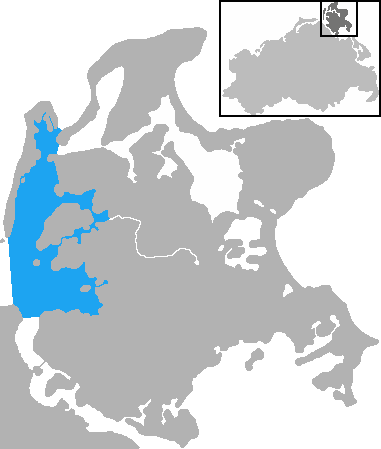
West Rügen Bodden

The West Rügen Bodden (German: Westrügener Bodden or Rügenschen Außenboddenkette) are a string of lagoons and embayments, known as bodden, in Western Pomerania on the Baltic Sea coast. They lie in the Western Pomerania Lagoon Area National Park west and southwest of the island of Rügen, and east and southeast of Hiddensee.

The individual lagoons or bodden that make up the West Rügen Bodden are the:

- Vitter Bodden
- Schaproder Bodden
- Udarser Wiek
- Kubitzer Bodden

(listed from north to south; several smaller linking waterbodies are not mentioned)

== See also ==
- North Rügen Bodden
- Darss-Zingst Bodden Chain
