= Filip Julius Bernhard von Platen =

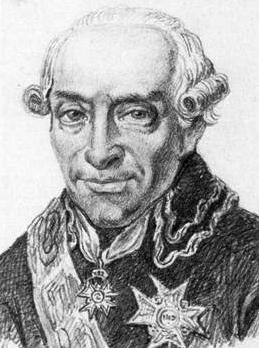
- Philip von Platen, blyertsteckning.
- Born: Filip Julius Bernhard von Platen; 14 March 1732; Schaprode
- Died: 13 April 1805 (aged 73)
- Resting place: St. Mary's Church
- Children: Carl Gustaf von Platen, Baltzar von Platen
- Parent(s): Christoffer Ernst von Platen
- Family: von Platen family
- Awards: Order of the Seraphim (1790); Knight of the Order of the Sword (1760); Commander of the Order of the Sword (1778); Order of the Sword - Commander Grand Cross (1786); Knight Grand Cross of the Order of the Sword (1789)
- Rank: fältmarskalk (1799–)
- Titles: Freiherr (1797–)

Philip Julius Bernhard von Platen (14 March 1732 - 23 April 1805) was a Swedish politician and field marshal.

Von Platen was admitted to the Swedish Ritterschaft on October 23, 1778. On August 23, 1788, he rose to the lieutenant general and advanced on November 2, 1795, to the General of Cavalry, was held on November 1, 1797, in the Swedish Freemasonry, and rose to the Field Marshal on November 16, 1799. From 1796 to 1800 he was the Governor-General of Swedish Pomerania.

He fought in 1758-1762 during the Seven Years' War in Pomerania and was wounded in battle at Löcknitz.
