= Wührens =

German island

Geography
- Location: Baltic Sea
- Coordinates: 54°27′51.5″N 13°12′39″E
- Area: 0.0173 km^{2} (0.0067 sq mi)
- Length: 230 m (750 ft)
- Width: 80 m (260 ft)

Administration
- Germany

Demographics
- Population: 0

Wührens (German pronunciation: [ˈvyːʁəns]) is a German island in the Baltic Sea, near the much larger island of Rügen. Its maximum extent measures 230 by 80 metres (750 by 260 ft) and it has an area of 1.73 hectares (4.3 acres), rising just about sea level. It is uninhabited and only grass-covered. It is surrounded by the neighbouring islands of Liebes to the west, Urkevitz to the east and Mährens to the north. It is the smallest of the four islands in the channels of Wittenberger and Focker Strom.

The island lies within the Western Pomerania Lagoon Area National Park and, as a bird reserve, is out-of-bounds to the public. Municipally it belongs to Ummanz.
