= Stone Fields in the Schmale Heath and Extension =

Coordinates: 54°28′08″N 13°33′28″E

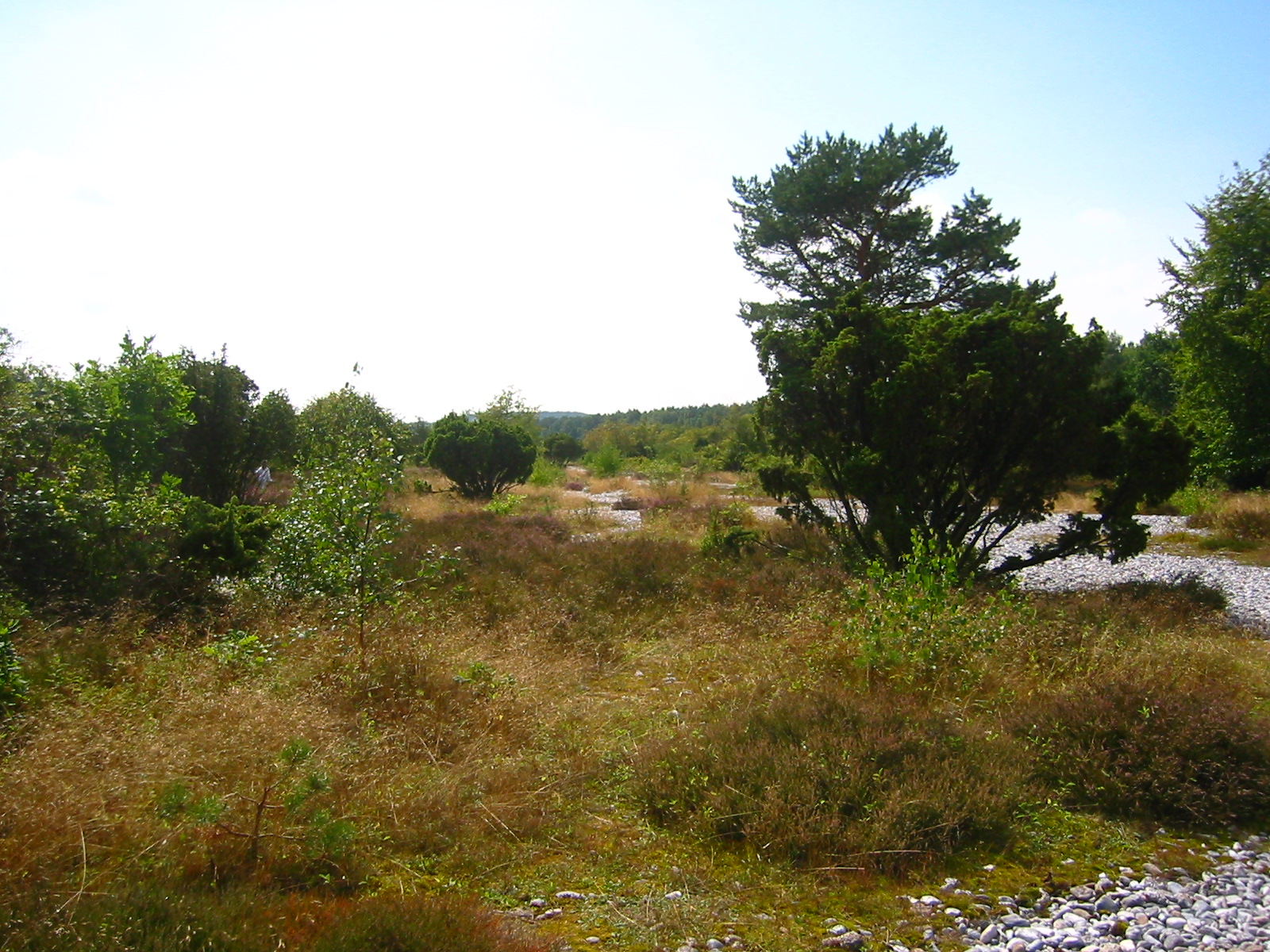
View of the nature reserve

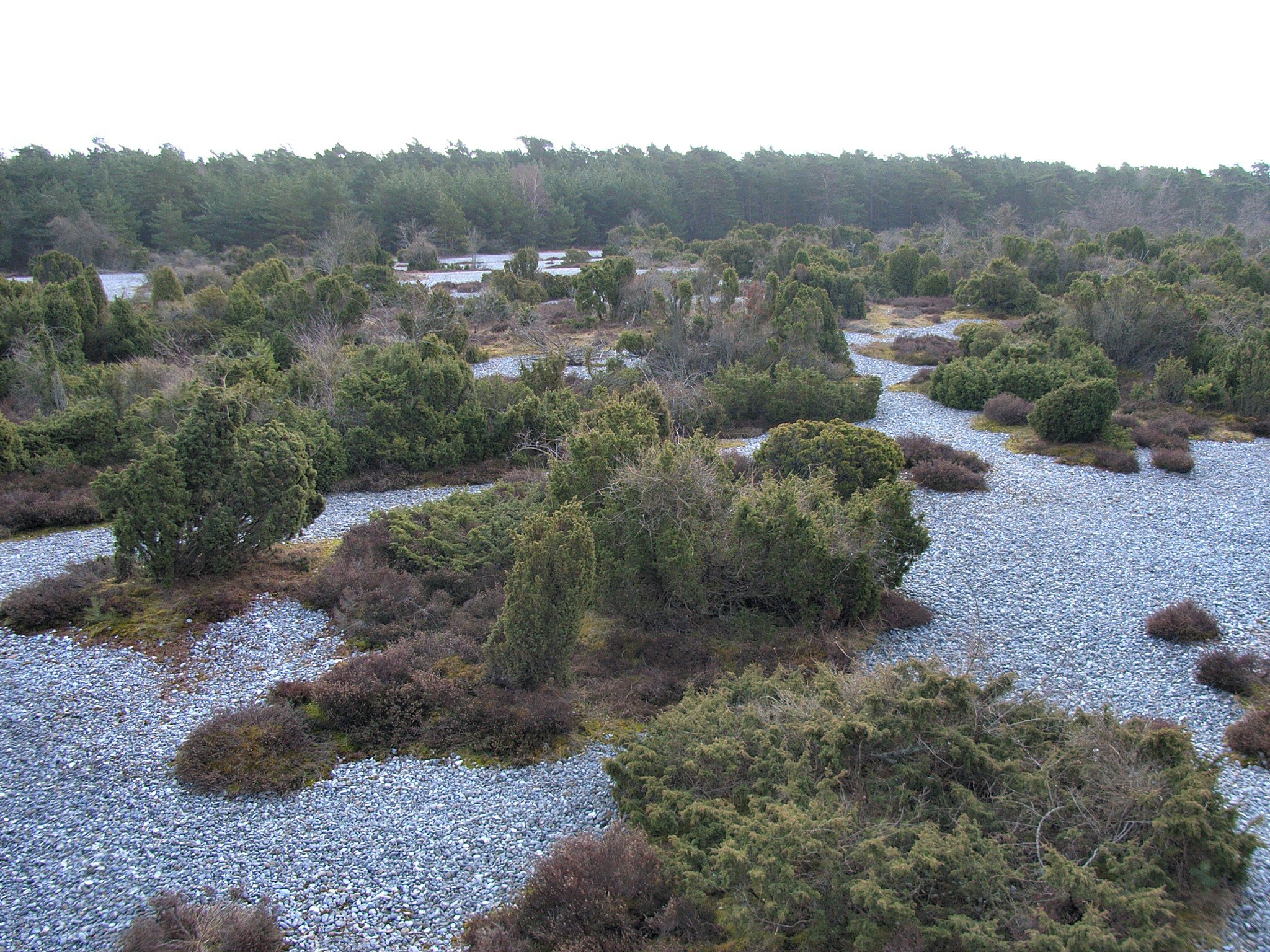
Juniper bushes

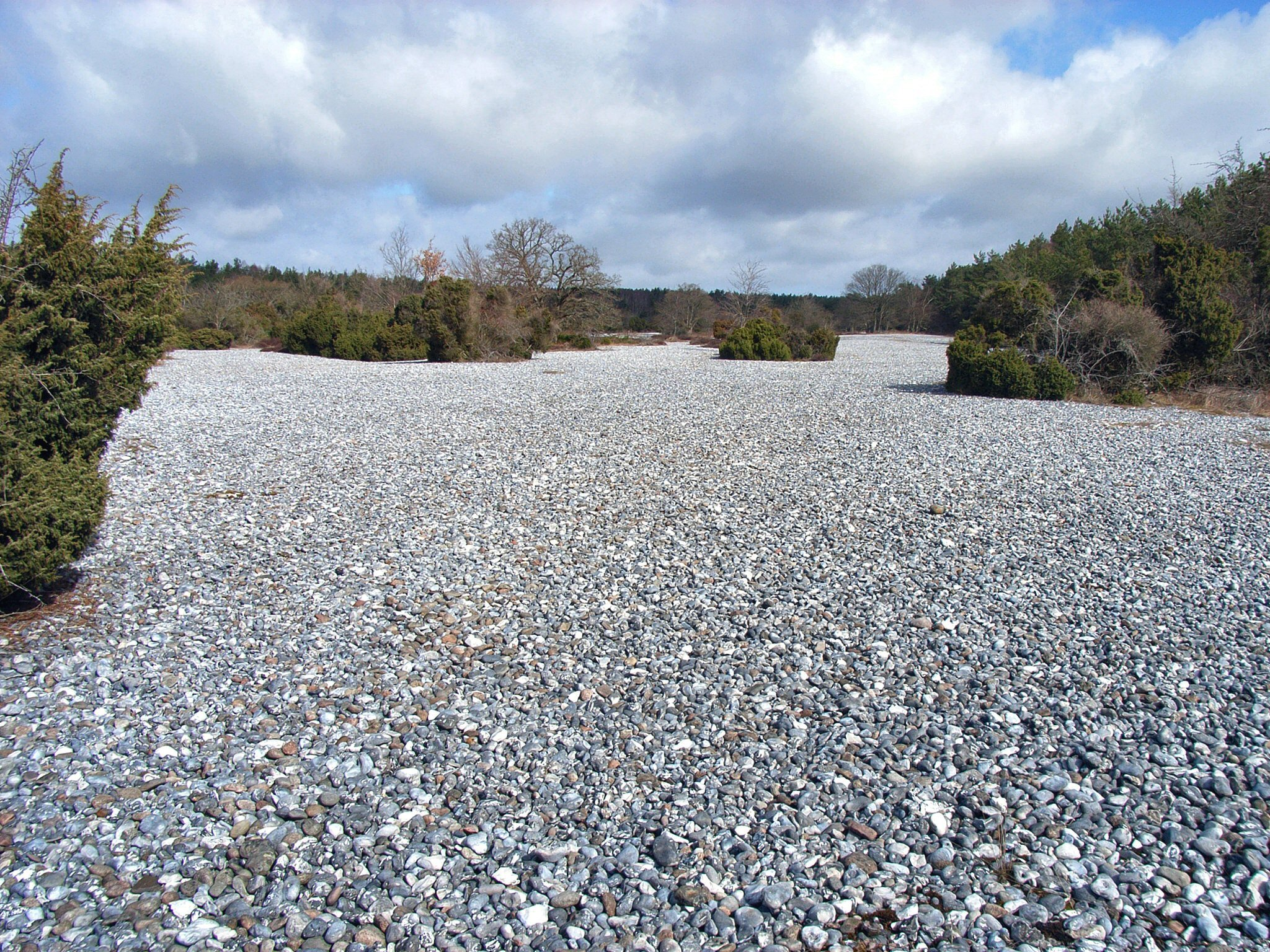
The Rügen flint fields: southern section

The Stone Fields in the Schmale Heath and Extension (Note: German: Steinfelder in der Schmalen Heide und Erweiterung) is a nature reserve (Naturschutzgebiet), 199 hectares in area, on the German island of Rügen in Mecklenburg-Western Pomerania. It includes large flint fields (German: Feuersteinfelder), a representative section of the Schmale Heath and a separate extension with near-natural coastal dunes. The reserve was created on 27 April 1935. Two extensions of the nature reserve area came into force in the years 1959 and 1990.

The areas are located seven kilometres north of Binz between the Kleiner Jasmunder Bodden and the Baltic Sea. The reserve is assessed as in good condition. The high numbers of visiting tourists in the flint fields causes disturbances, though, to the fauna.

The nature reserve is accessible via a footpath from Neu Mukran.

In 2009 the nature reserve areas were taken over by the German Federal Environment Foundation (Deutsche Bundesstiftung Umwelt). According to EU law, the nature reserve is part of the Special Area of Conservation known as the Kleiner Jasmunder Bodden, Jasmund Peninsula and Schmale Heath (Kleiner Jasmunder Bodden mit Halbinseln und Schmaler Heide).

== Literature ==
- Umweltministerium Mecklenburg-Vorpommern, ed. (2003), "Steinfelder in der Schmalen Heide und Erweiterung 43", Die Naturschutzgebiete in Mecklenburg-Vorpommern (in German), Schwerin: Demmler-Verlag, pp. 134f, ISBN 3-910150-52-7
