= Flint =

Cryptocrystalline form of the mineral quartz

- Sedimentary rock
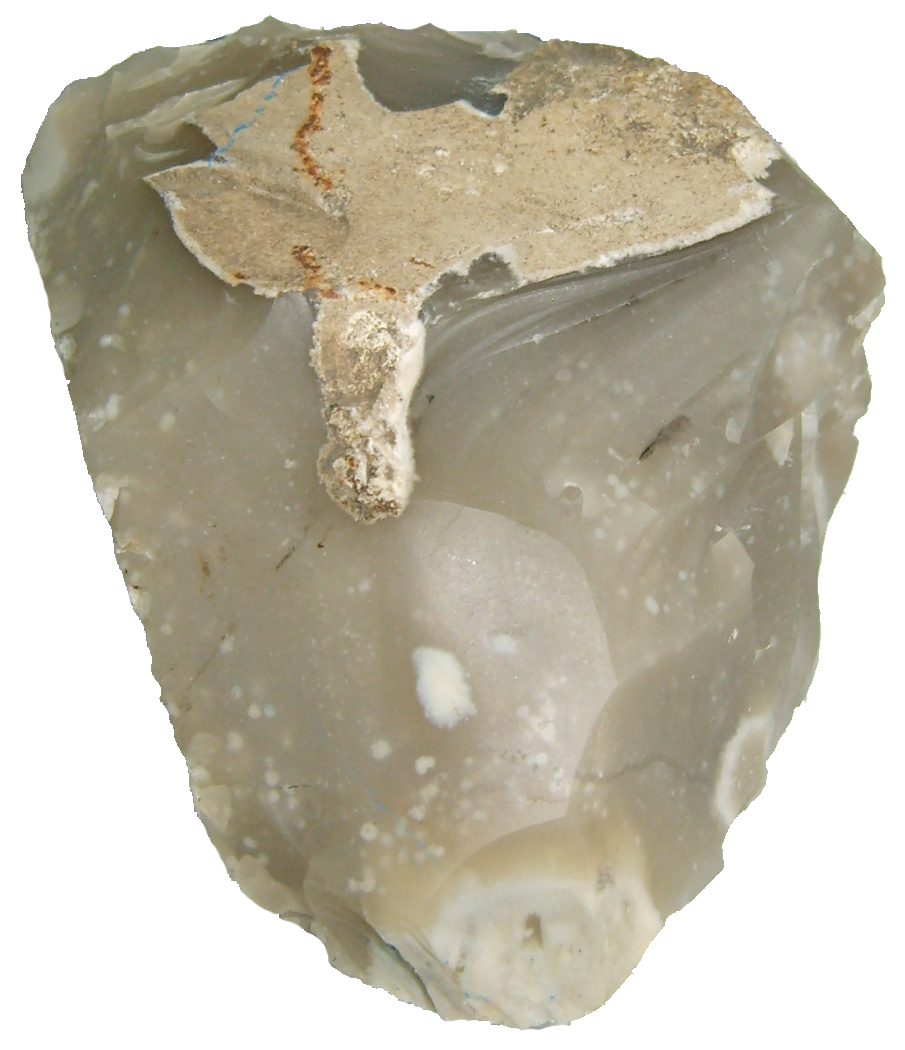
- A sample of Miorcani flint from the Cenomanian chalky marl layer of the Moldavian Plateau (c. 7.5 cm (3.0 in) wide)

Composition
- Cryptocrystalline quartz

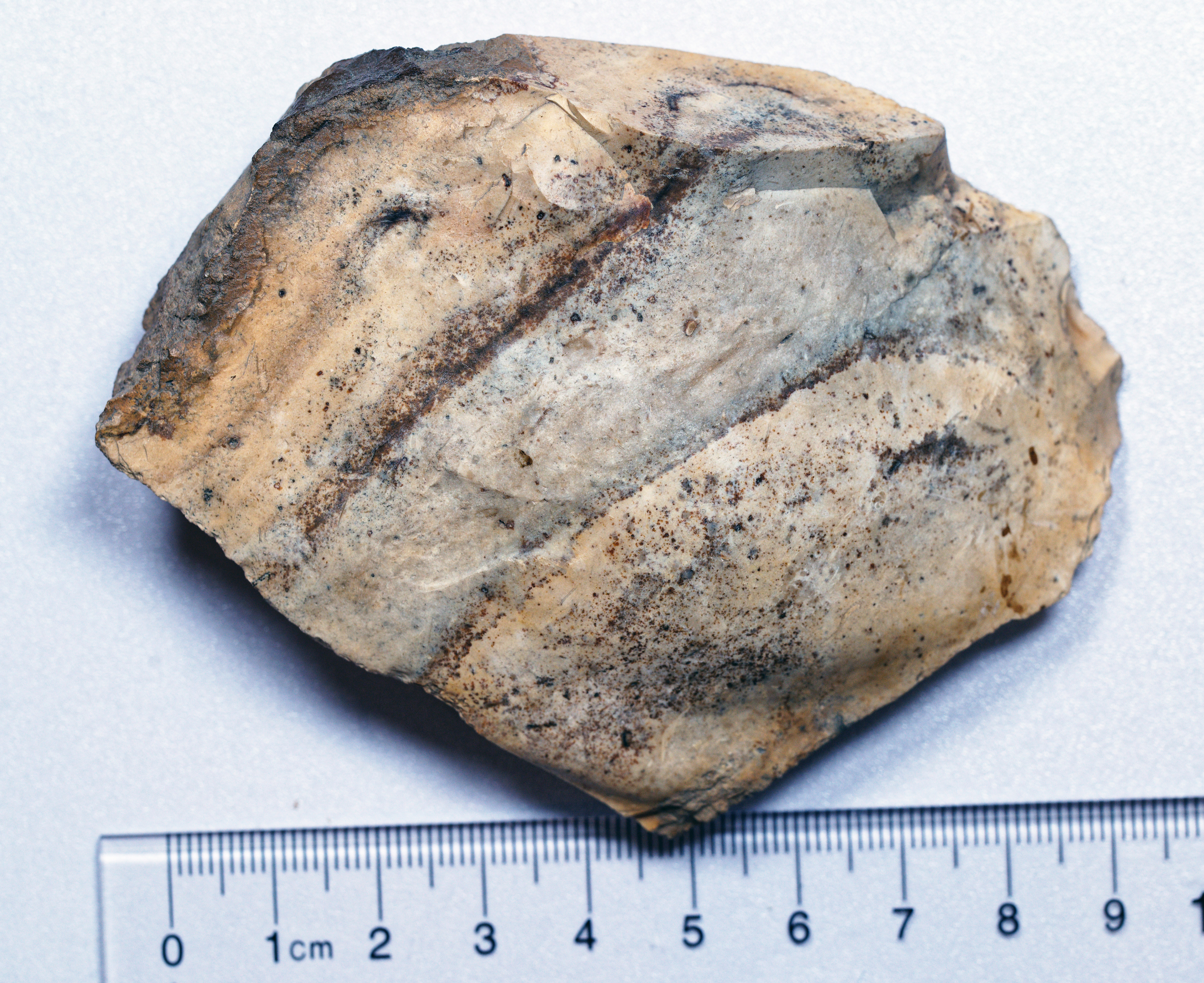
A piece of flint 9–10 cm (3.5–3.9 in) long, weighing 171 grams

Flint, occasionally flintstone (SiO_{2}), is a sedimentary cryptocrystalline form of the mineral quartz, categorized as the variety of chert that occurs in chalk or marly limestone. Historically, flint was widely used to make stone tools and start fires.

Flint occurs chiefly as nodules and masses in sedimentary rocks, such as chalks and limestones. Inside the nodule, flint is usually dark grey or black, green, white, or brown in colour, and has a glassy or waxy appearance. A thin, oxidised layer on the outside of the nodules is usually different in colour, typically white and rough in texture. The nodules can often be found along streams and beaches.

When flint is broken or chipped, the pieces have sharp edges, making it useful as cutting tools, such as knife blades and scrapers. The use of flint to make stone tools dates back more than three million years; flint's extreme durability has made it possible to accurately date its use over this time. Flint is one of the primary materials used to define the Stone Age.

During the Stone Age, access to flint was so important for survival that people would travel or trade long distances to obtain the stone. Flint Ridge in Ohio was an important source of flint, and Native Americans extracted flint from hundreds of quarries along the ridge. This "Ohio Flint" was traded across the eastern United States, and has been found as far west as the Rocky Mountains and south around the Gulf of Mexico.

When struck against steel, flint will produce enough sparks to ignite a fire with the correct tinder, or gunpowder used in weapons, namely the flintlock firing mechanism. Although it has been superseded in these uses by different processes (the percussion cap), or materials (ferrocerium), "flint" has lent its name as generic term for a fire starter.

== Origin ==
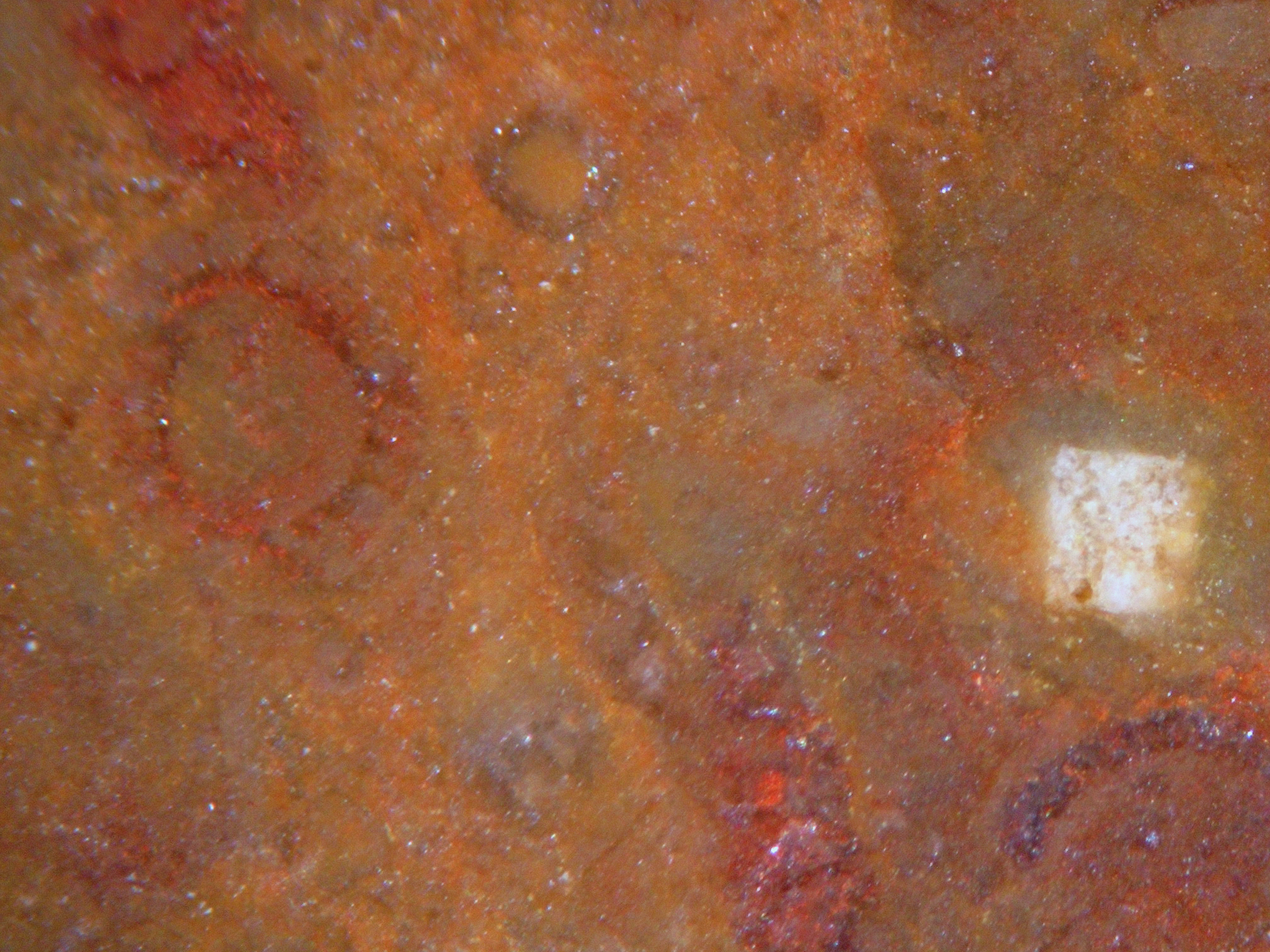
Silicified remains of algae and silica pseudomorph after halite in flint. Pebble of Loire near Marcigny, France. Image width: about 5 mm

The exact mode of formation of flint is not yet clear, but it is thought that it occurs as a result of chemical changes in sediment during the process of diagenesis. One hypothesis is that a gelatinous material fills cavities in the sediment, such as the holes made by crustaceans or molluscs, and that these become silicified. This hypothesis would explain the complex shapes of flint nodules that are found. The source of dissolved silica in the porous media could be the spicules of siliceous sponges (demosponges). Certain types of flint, such as that from the south coast of England and its counterpart on the French side of the Channel, contain trapped fossilised marine flora. Pieces of coral and vegetation have been found preserved inside the flint, similar to the way insects and plant parts are preserved within amber. Thin slices of the stone often reveal this effect.

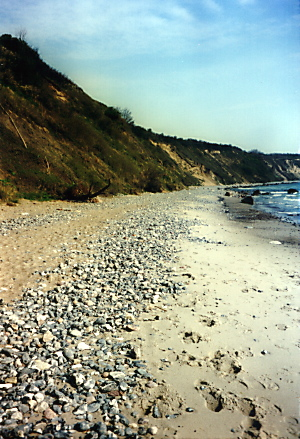
Pebble beach made up of flint nodules eroded from the nearby chalk cliffs, Cape Arkona, Rügen, northeast Germany

Flint sometimes occurs in large flint fields in Jurassic or Cretaceous beds, for example, in Europe. Puzzling giant flint formations known as paramoudra and flint circles are found around Europe, but especially in Norfolk, England, on the beaches at Beeston Bump and West Runton.

The "Ohio flint" is the official gemstone of Ohio state. It is formed from limey debris that was deposited at the bottom of inland Paleozoic seas hundreds of millions of years ago that hardened into limestone and later became infused with silica. The flint from Flint Ridge is found in many hues, including red, green, pink, blue, white, and grey, with the colour variations caused by minute impurities of iron compounds.

Flint can be sandy brown, medium to dark grey, black, reddish brown or an off-white grey in colour.

== Uses ==
=== Tools or cutting edges ===
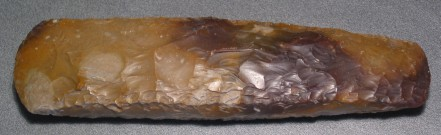
Neolithic flint axe, about 31 cm long

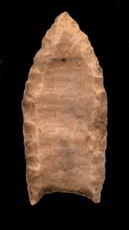
A 12,000 year old Folsom tradition spearpoint about 76 mm (3 in) long

Flint was used in the manufacture of tools during the Stone Age, as it splits into thin, sharp splinters called flakes or blades (depending on the shape) when struck by another hard object (such as a hammerstone made of another material). This process is referred to as knapping.

Flint mining is attested since the Paleolithic, but became more common since the Neolithic (notably among the Michelsberg culture and Funnelbeaker culture). In Europe, some of the best toolmaking flint has come from Belgium (Obourg, flint mines of Spiennes), the coastal chalks of the English Channel, the Paris Basin, Thy in Jutland (flint mine at Hov), the Sennonian deposits of Rügen, Grimes Graves in England, the Upper Cretaceous chalk formation of Dobruja and the lower Danube (Balkan flint), the Cenomanian chalky marl formation of the Moldavian Plateau (Miorcani flint), and the Jurassic deposits of the Kraków area and Krzemionki in Poland, as well as of the Lägern (silex) in the Jura Mountains of Switzerland.

In 1938, a project of the Ohio Historical Society, under the leadership of H. Holmes Ellis began to study the knapping methods and techniques of Native Americans. Like past studies, this work involved experimenting with actual knapping techniques by creation of stone tools through the use of techniques like direct freehand percussion, freehand pressure and pressure using a rest. Other scholars who have conducted similar experiments and studies include William Henry Holmes, Alonzo W. Pond, Francis H. S. Knowles and Don Crabtree.

To reduce susceptibility to fragmentation, flint/chert may be heat-treated, being slowly brought up to a temperature of 150 to 260 °C (300 to 500 °F) for 24 hours, then slowly cooled to room temperature. This makes the material more homogeneous and thus more knappable and produces tools with a cleaner, sharper cutting edge. If temperatures exceed this, the flint has a tendency to explode; therefore deliberate use of this technique suggests a strong understanding of pyrotechnology. The current earliest evidence of deliberately heat-treated chert comes from Hoedjiespunt 1 in South Africa, dating MIS- 5e (130-119 kya) which corresponds to the Middle Stone Age.

=== To ignite fire or gunpowder ===
When struck against steel, a flint edge produces sparks. The hard flint edge shaves off a particle of the steel that exposes iron, which reacts with oxygen from the atmosphere and can ignite the proper tinder.

Prior to the wide availability of steel, rocks of pyrite (FeS_{2}) would be used along with the flint, in a similar (but more time-consuming) way. These methods remain popular in woodcraft, bushcraft, and amongst people practising traditional fire-starting skills.

==== Flintlocks ====
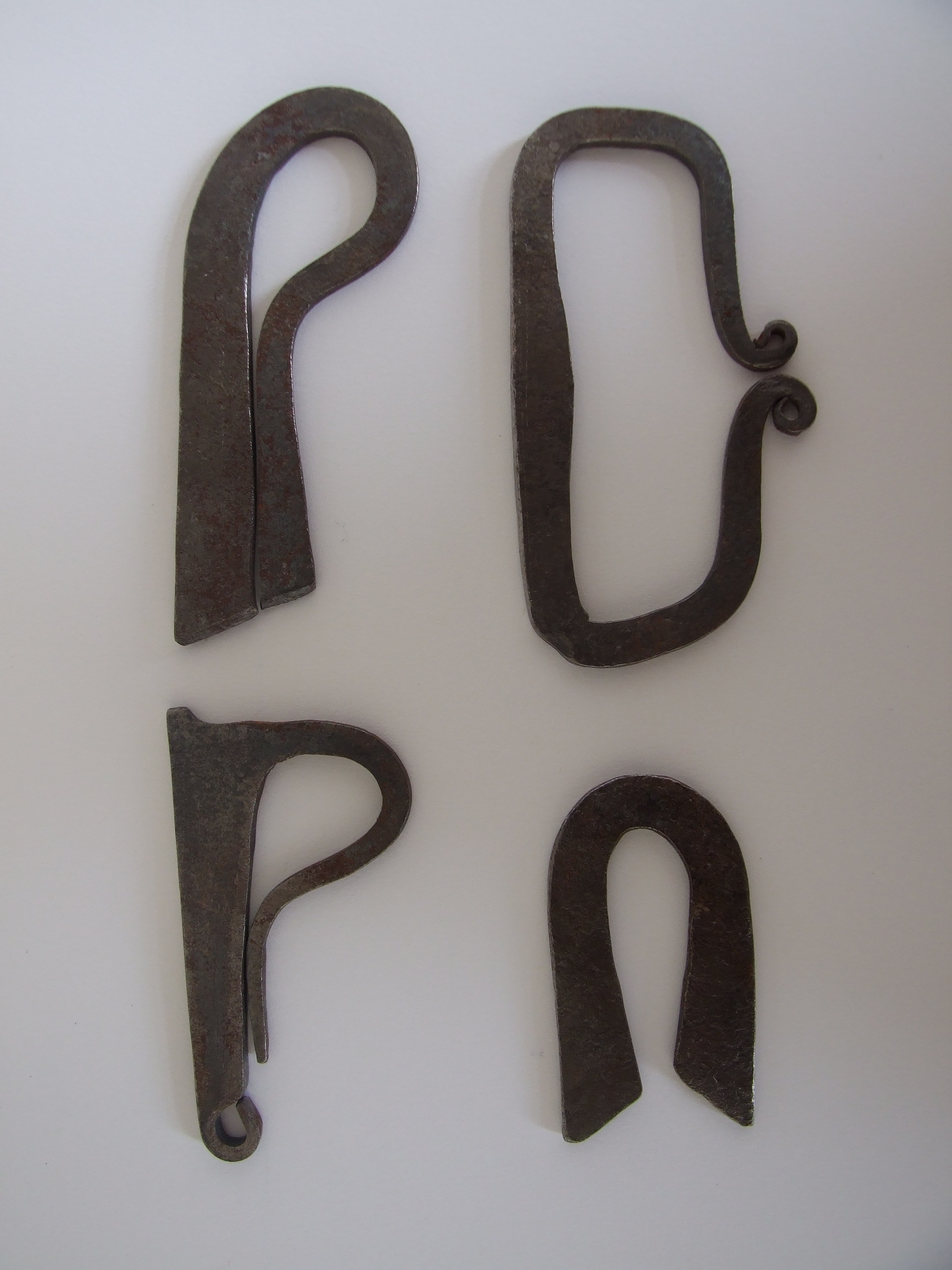
Assorted reproduction firesteels typical of Roman to Medieval period

A later, major use of flint and steel was in the flintlock mechanism, used primarily in flintlock firearms, but also used on dedicated fire-starting tools. A piece of flint held in the jaws of a spring-loaded hammer, when released by a trigger, strikes a hinged piece of steel ("frizzen") at an angle, creating a shower of sparks and exposing a charge of priming powder. The sparks ignite the priming powder and that flame, in turn, ignites the main charge, propelling the ball, bullet, or shot through the barrel. While the military use of the flintlock declined after the adoption of the percussion cap from the 1840s onward, flintlock rifles and shotguns remain in use amongst recreational shooters.

==== Comparison with ferrocerium ====
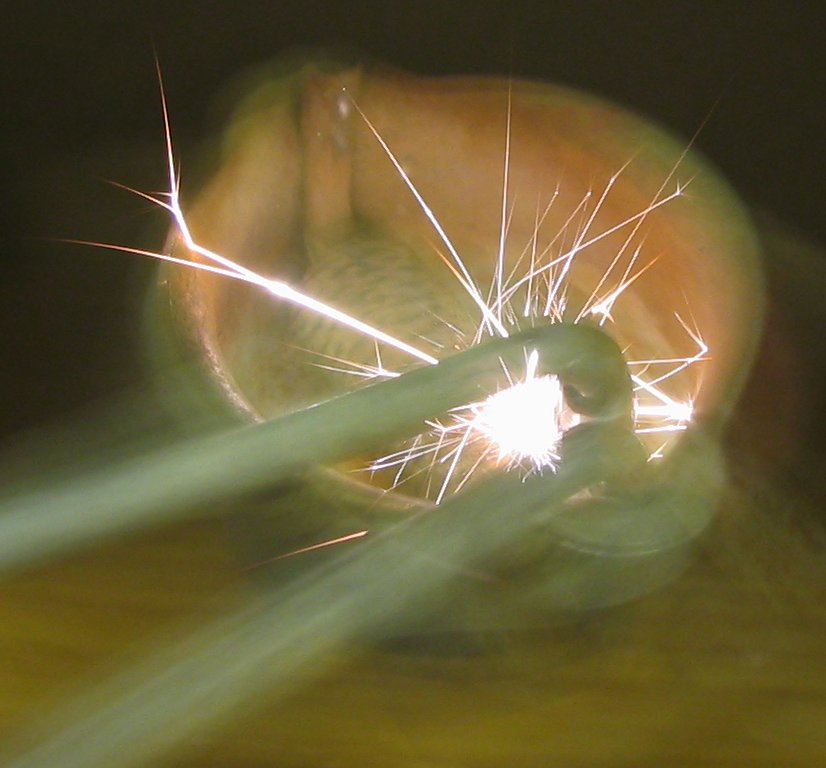
A ferrocerium "flint" spark lighter in action

Flint and steel used to strike sparks were superseded in the 20th century by ferrocerium (sometimes referred to as "mischmetal", "hot spark", "metal match", "fire steel", or simply but inaccurately as just "flint"). This human-made material, when scraped with any hard, sharp edge, produces sparks that are much hotter than obtained with natural flint and steel, allowing use of a wider range of tinders. Because it can produce sparks when wet and can start fires when used correctly, ferrocerium is commonly included in survival kits. Ferrocerium is used in many lighters, where it is referred to as "a flint".

==== Fragmentation ====
Flint's utility as a fire starter is hampered by its property of uneven expansion under heating, causing it to fracture, sometimes violently, during heating. This tendency is enhanced by the impurities found in most samples of flint that may expand to a greater or lesser degree than the surrounding stone, and is similar to the tendency of glass to shatter when exposed to heat, and can become a drawback when flint is used as a building material.

=== As a building material ===
Flint, knapped or unknapped, has been used from antiquity (for example at the Late Roman fort of Burgh Castle in Norfolk) up to the present day as a material for building stone walls, using lime mortar, and often combined with other available stone or brick rubble. It was most common in the parts of southern England where no good building stone was available locally, and where brick-making was not widespread until the late Middle Ages. It is especially associated with East Anglia, but also used in chalky areas stretching through Hampshire, Sussex, Surrey and Kent to Somerset.

Flint was used in the construction of many churches, houses, and other buildings, for example, the large stronghold of Framlingham Castle. Many different decorative effects have been achieved by using different types of knapping or arrangement and combinations with stone (flushwork), especially in the 15th and early 16th centuries. Because knapping flints to a relatively flush surface and size is a highly skilled process with a high level of wastage, flint finishes typically indicate high status buildings.

During World War I, in the chalky-soil country of France, the British filled sandbags with flint and used these sandbags as breastworks.

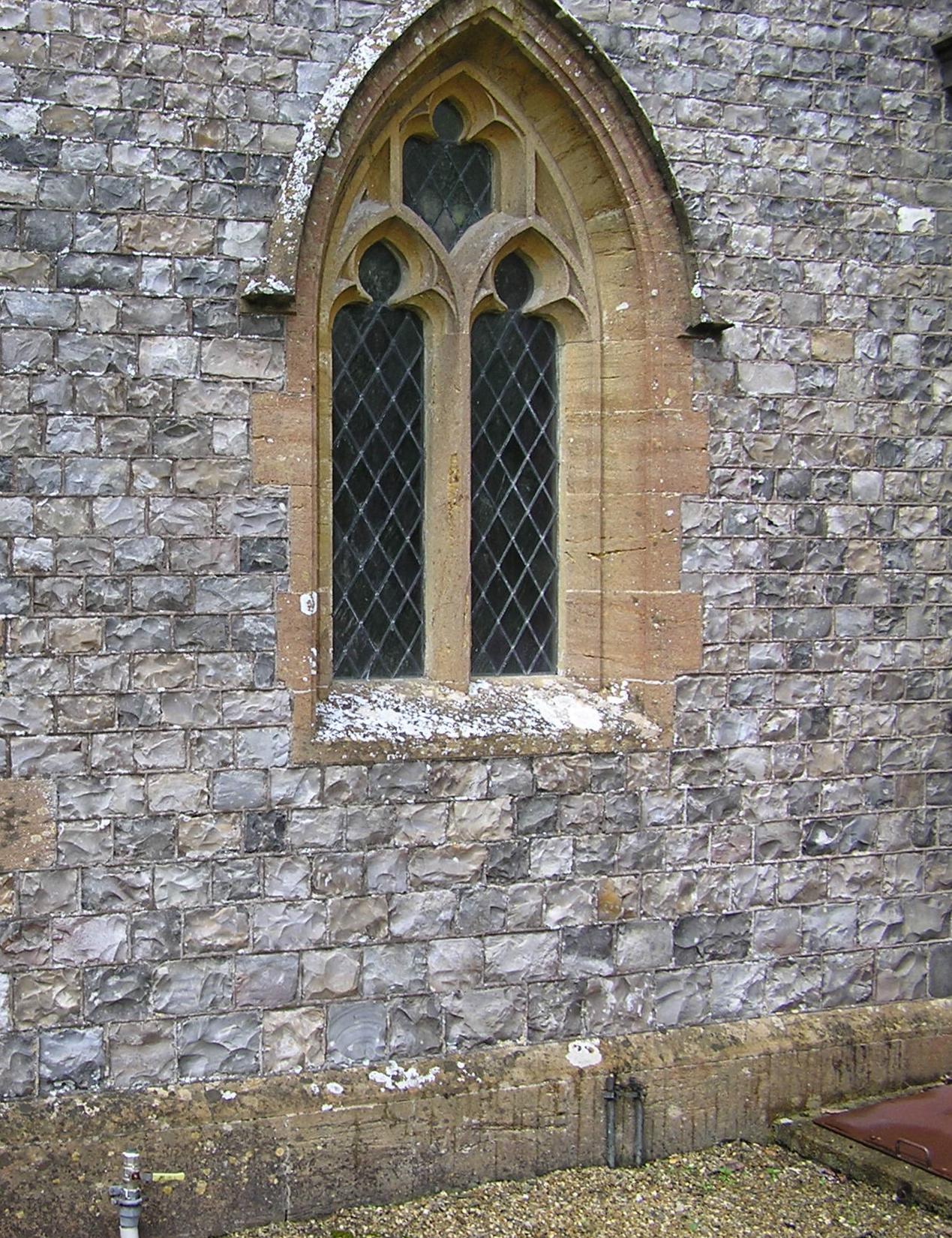
A flint church – the Parish Church of Saint Thomas, in Cricket Saint Thomas, Somerset, England. The height of the very neatly knapped flints varies between 3 and 5 inches (7.6 and 12.7 cm).

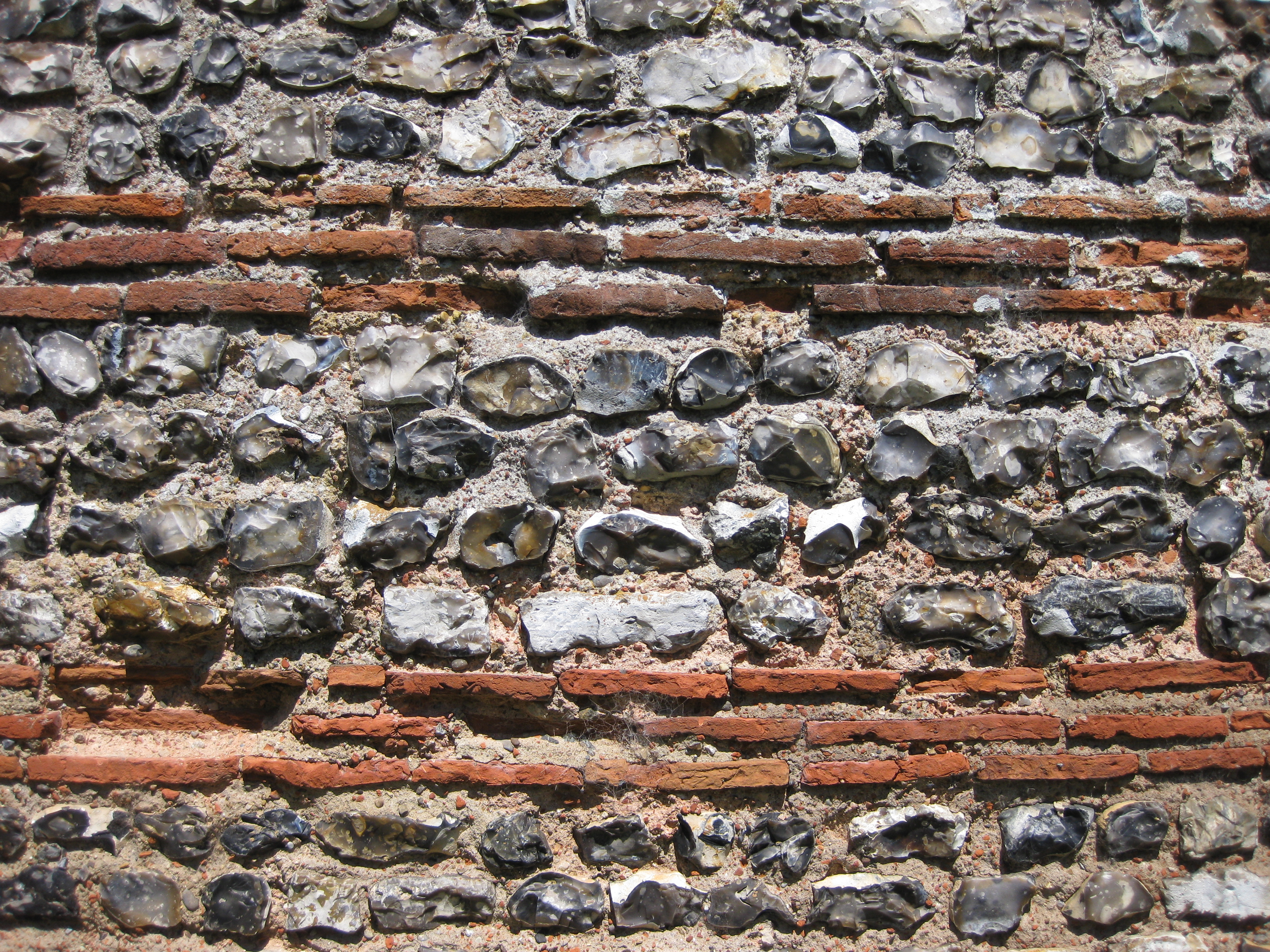
Close-up of the wall of the Roman shore fort at Burgh Castle, Norfolk, showing alternating courses of flint and brick

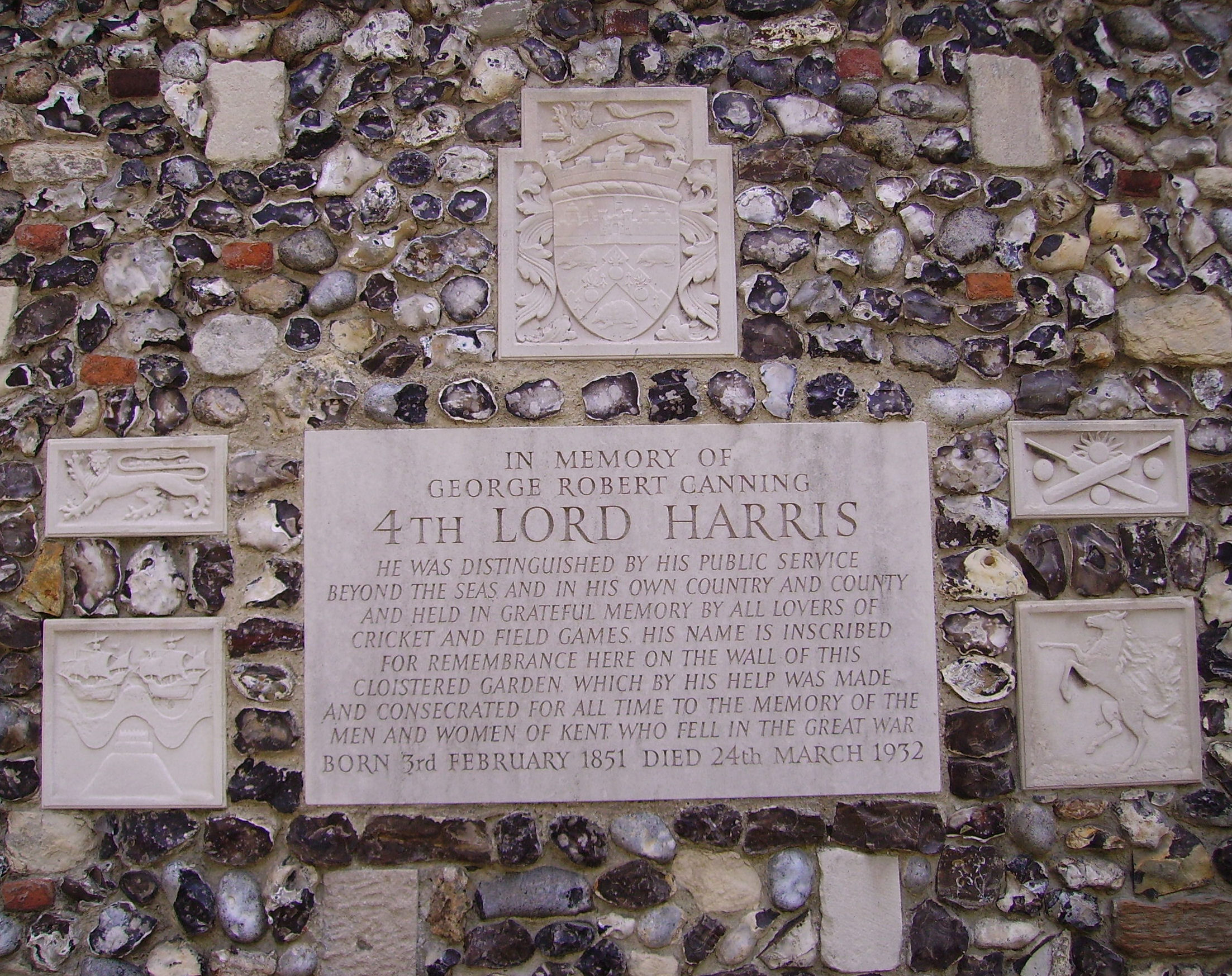
A typical medieval wall (with modern memorial) at Canterbury Cathedral – knapped and unknapped ("cobble") flints are mixed with pieces of brick and other stones.

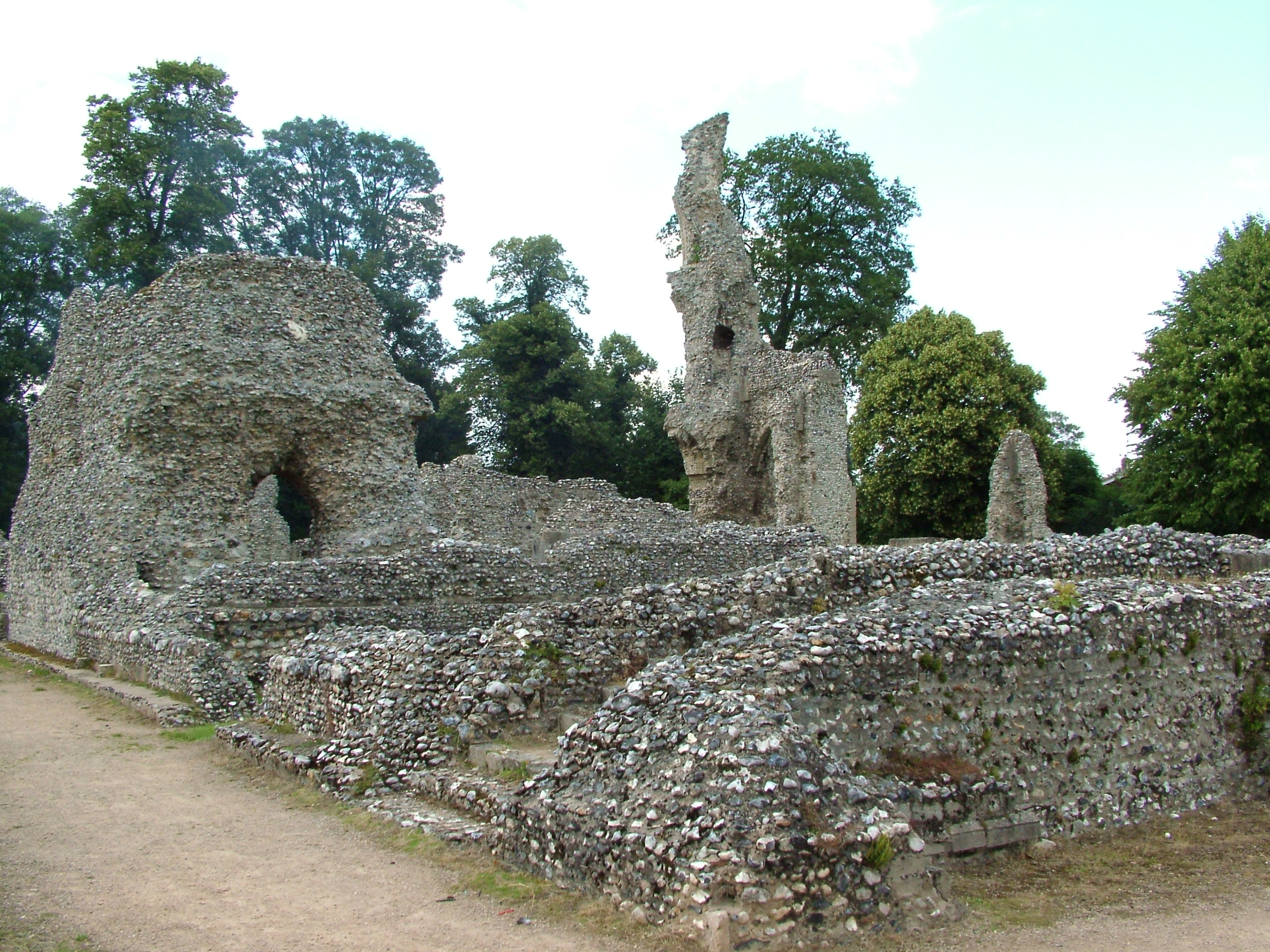
Ruins of Thetford Priory show flints and mortar through the whole depth of the wall

=== Ceramics ===
Flint pebbles are used as the media in ball mills to grind glazes and other raw materials for the ceramics industry. The pebbles are hand-selected based on colour; those having a tint of red, indicating high iron content, are discarded. The remaining blue-grey stones have a low content of chromophoric oxides and so are less deleterious to the colour of the ceramic composition after firing.

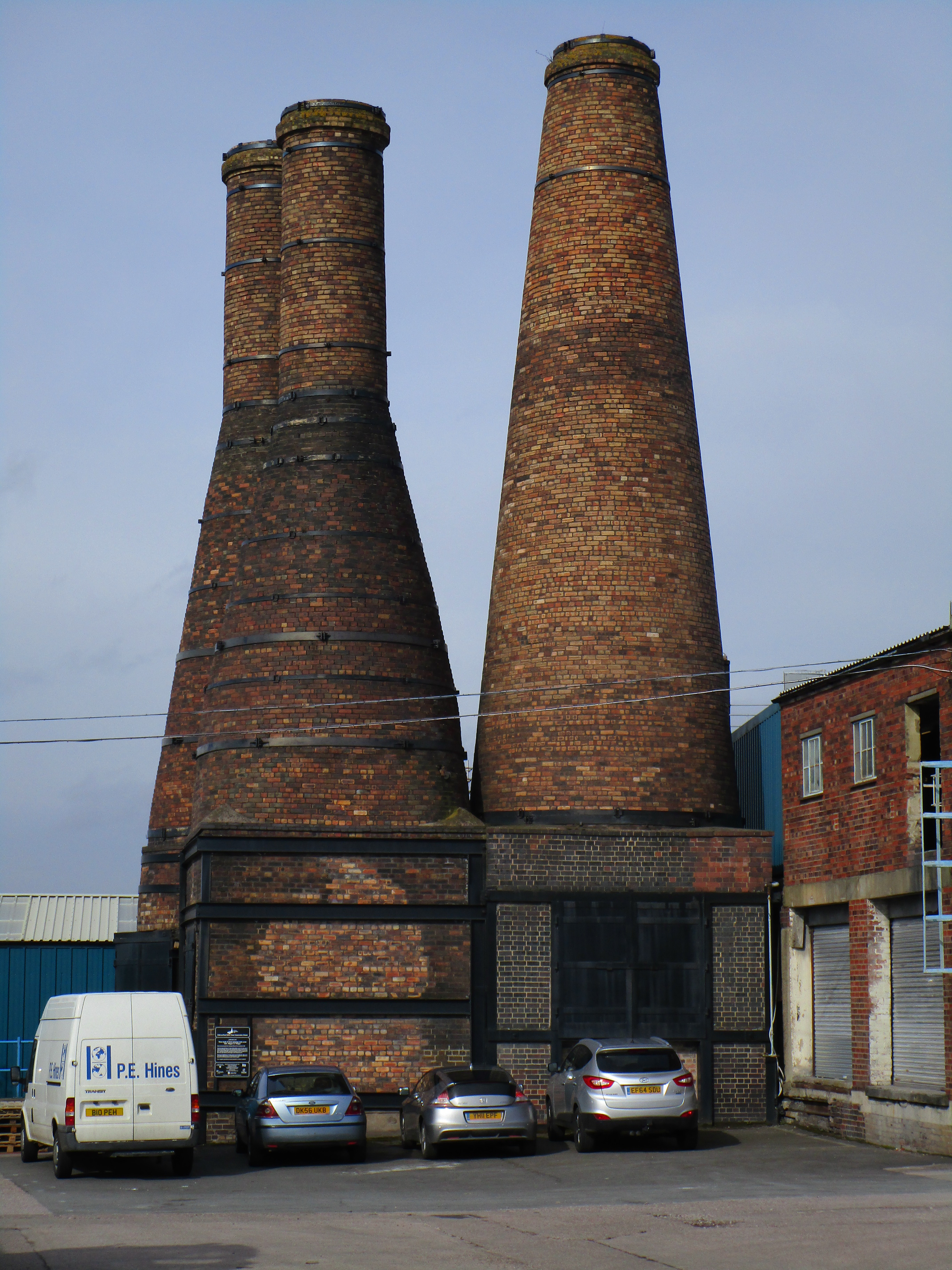
Bottle kilns traditionally used for calcining flint

Until recently calcined flint was also an important raw material in clay-based ceramic bodies produced in the UK. In clay bodies, calcined flint attenuates the shrinkage whilst drying, and modifies the fired thermal expansion. Flint can also be used in glazes as a network former. In preparation for use flint pebbles, frequently sourced from the coasts of South-East England or Western France, were calcined to around 1,000 °C (1,800 °F). This heating process both removed organic impurities and induced certain physical reactions, including converting some of the quartz to cristobalite. After calcination the flint pebbles were crushed and milled to a fine particle size. However, the use of flint has now been superseded by quartz. Because of the historical use of flint, the word "flint" is used by some potters (especially in the U.S.) to refer generically to siliceous raw materials used in ceramics that are not flint.

=== Jewellery ===
Flint bracelets were known in Ancient Egypt, and several examples have been found.

== See also ==
Mineralogy

- Agate – Banded variety of chalcedony
- Chalcedony – Microcrystalline or cryptocrystalline form of silica
- Eolith – Knapped flint nodule
- Jasper – Chalcedony variety colored by iron oxide
- Nodule (geology) – Small mass of a mineral with a contrasting composition to the enclosing sediment or rock not to be confused with concretion
- Obsidian – Naturally occurring volcanic glass
- Onyx – Black and white variety of agate
- Opal – Hydrated amorphous form of silica
- Whinstone – Quarrying term for any hard dark-coloured rock

Archaeology

- Clovis points – New World prehistoric projectile, archaeological artefacts of the Clovis culture in New Mexico, US
- Grimes Graves – Neolithic flint mines in Norfolk, England, a prehistoric flint mine in Norfolk, England
- Flint Ridge State Memorial – Archaeological site in Ohio, United States, a Native American flint quarry in Hopewell Township, Licking County, Ohio, US
- Flint mine
