= Paramoudra =

Flint nodules with a hollow center

- Sedimentary rock
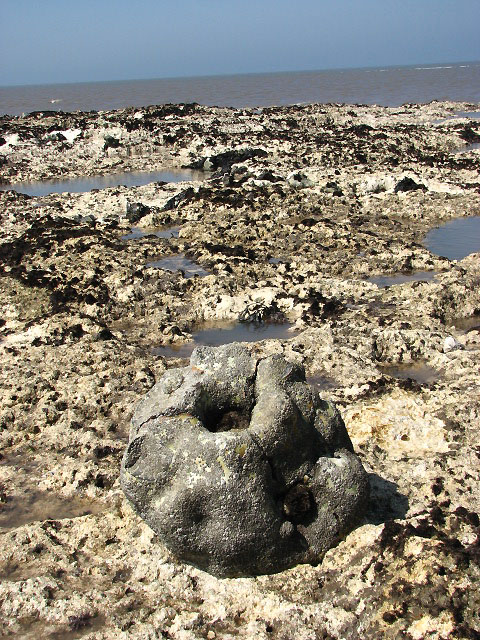
- Paramoudra on chalk outcrop, Norfolk, England.

Composition
- Flint, a type of silica, (chemical formula SiO_{2})

Paramoudras, paramoudra flints, pot stones or potstones are flint nodules found mainly in parts of north-west Europe: Norfolk (United Kingdom), Ireland, Denmark, Southern Basque Country (Spain) and Germany. In Norfolk they are known as pot stones and can be found on the beach below Beeston Bump just outside Beeston Regis. [Water Lane Slipway, West Runton] In Ireland they are known as paramoudras. The term paramoudras was first used by Buckland in 1817 and is a corruption of a Gaelic name, probably padhramoudras "ugly Paddies" or peura muireach "sea pears".

Pot stones are flint nodules with a hollow center and have the appearance of a doughnut (torus). They can be found in columns resembling a backbone.

These flints are trace fossils of the burrows of an organism otherwise unknown except for these relics sometimes referred to as Bathicnus paramoudrae.see Russel Yeomans for alternative formation. Paramoudrae are silicate fossil barrel sponges.
