= Flint field =

Flint fields (German: Feuersteinfelder) are large natural deposits of flint. They are found in numerous Jurassic and Cretaceous beds across the whole of Europe.

Such deposits may be found in Aachen-Lousberg, Kleinkems, Schernfeld, Osterberg bei Pfünz, Baiersdorf, Abensberg-Arnhofen and Lengfeld as well as the German island of Rügen.

== Flint fields on Rügen ==
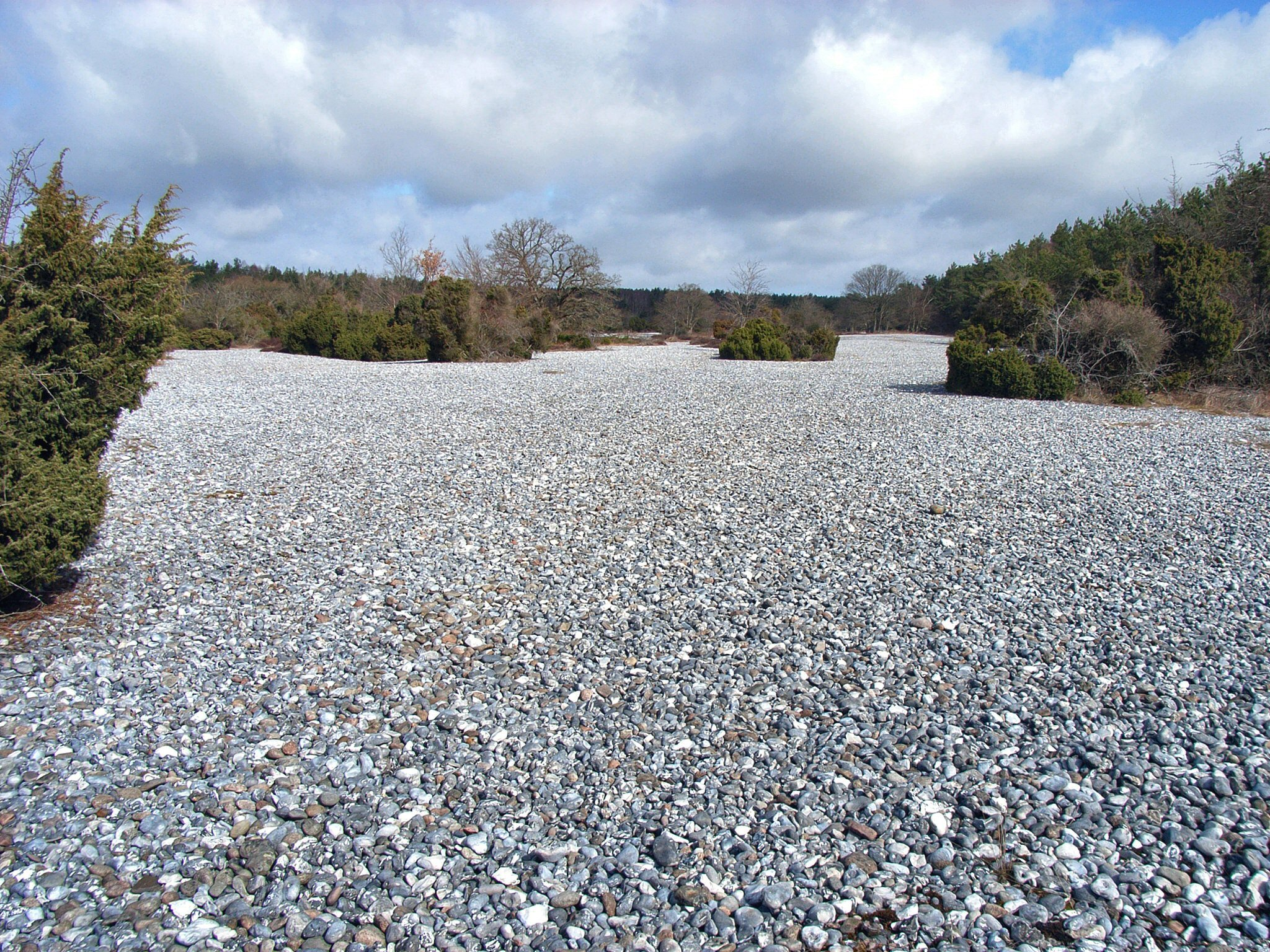
The Rügen flint fields: southern section

The flint fields on Germany's biggest island, Rügen, between Mukran and Prora in the northern part of the heath of Schmale Heide are part of the Stone Fields in the Schmale Heath and Extension nature reserve. They were also called the Steinernes Meer ("stony sea") and have an area of 40 hectares (2,000 × 200 metres). During a series of storm floods, 3,500 to 4,000 years ago, the stones, from the Cretaceous deposits on the Jasmund peninsula which had been broken up by the sea, were piled up here. The layer of flints is so thick that it does not allow more than a sparse vegetation layer.

In 1840 the Schmale Heide was planted with a pine wood, which surrounds the flint fields today. Since 1935, when the region was given conservation status, many trees, bushes and other plant species have been able to develop undisturbed. By the middle of the 19th century, and, for the last time in the mid-1970s to the early 1990s, attempts were made to protect the 14 open flint embankments from becoming overgrown, using perimeter fencing in places and introducing wildlife.

The flint fields are a well-known tourist destination (54°27′59″N 13°33′27″E). They cannot be accessed directly by car. Car travellers can park for a fee in the car park at the southern end of Neu Mukran and follow the two to three kilometre trail. The area can be reached by bicycle also from the south. The route to the southern end of the flint fields is a well maintained and picturesque woodland path which branches off (54°27′02″N 13°33′34″E) the old B 196a federal road immediately north of the caravan park (former traffic testing area). The nearest railway stop is Prora, around 2½ kilometres south of the area and five hundred metres south of the traffic testing area.
