= Windwatt =

Type of mudflat exposed as a result of wind action on water

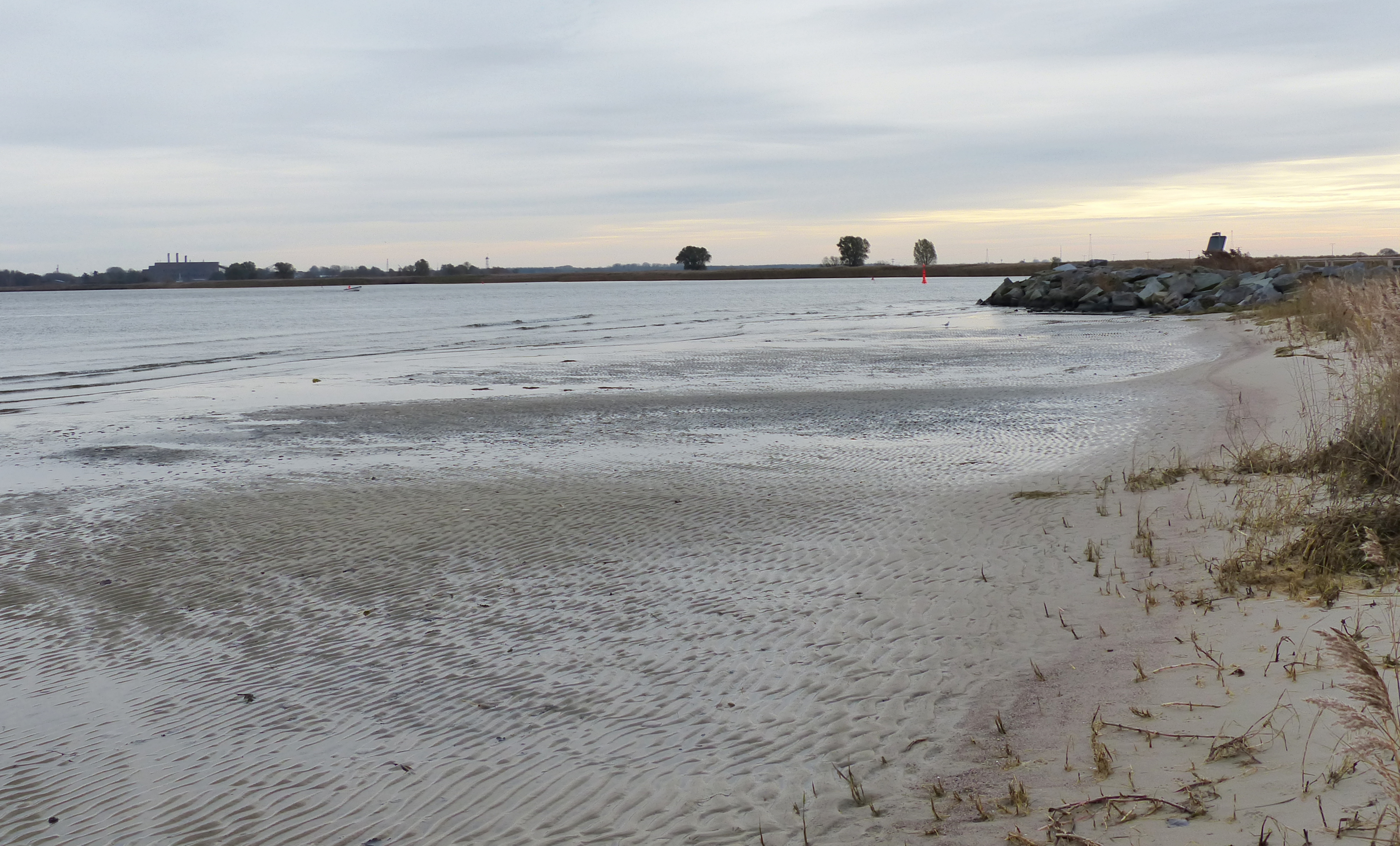
A windwatt in the Peenestrom near Freest

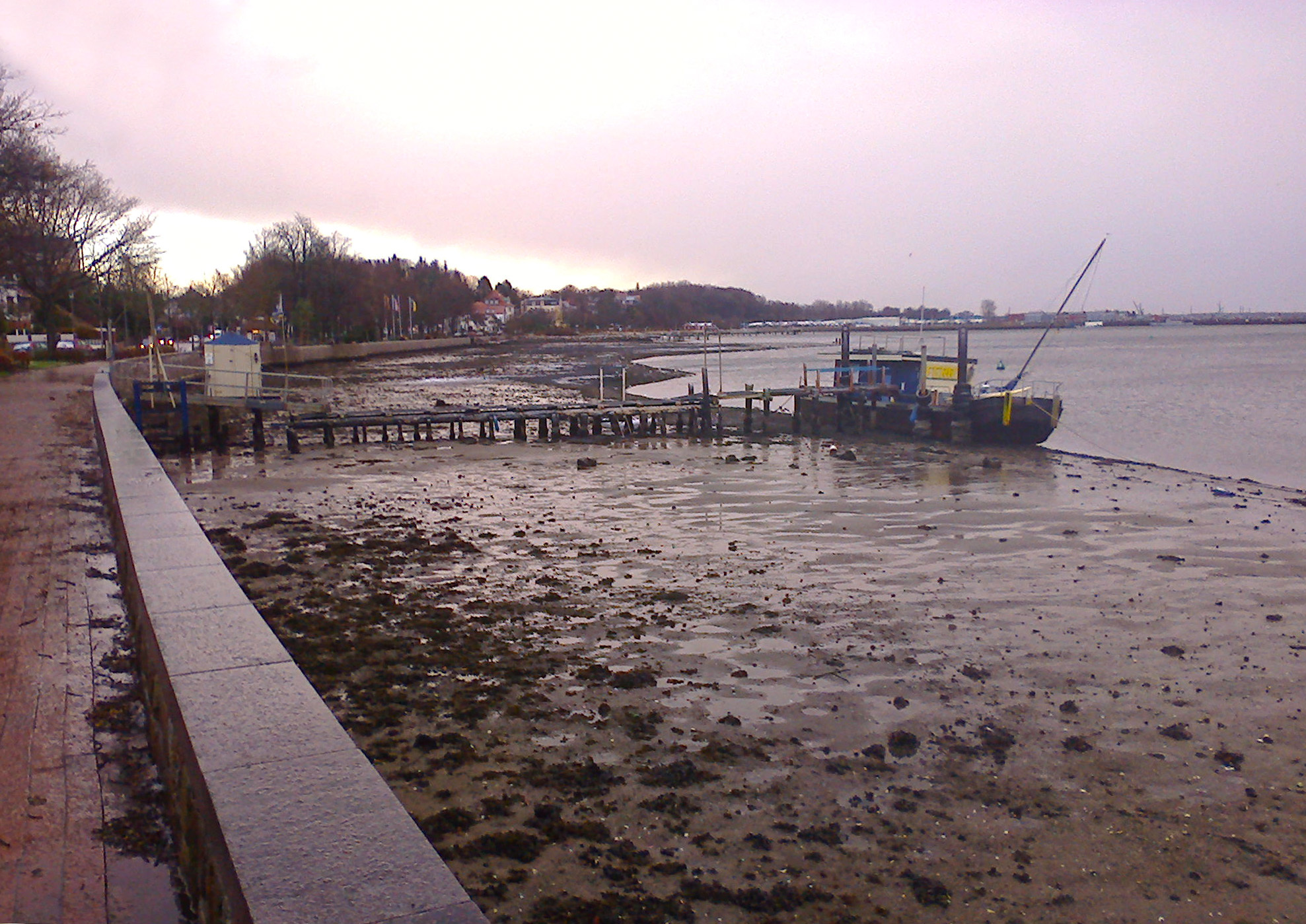
A windwatt that appeared in Eckernförde as a result of Cyclone Xaver

Windwatt (German pronunciation: [ˈvɪntvat]) is a mudflat exposed as a result of wind action on water. They occur especially in the Western Pomerania Lagoon Area National Park on Germany's Baltic Sea coast. The term is German.

Unlike the Wadden Sea along Europe's North Sea coast, the shallow water zones of the Western Pomerania Lagoon Area National Park are largely unaffected by oceanic tides. When there are strong winds in a certain direction, however, water is driven out of the lagoons (the so-called bodden) into the Baltic Sea, so that several particularly shallow areas of mud become exposed and dry out. The water flows back when the wind turns again. These Windwatten are a major source of food for migrating birds in the autumn. For the Crane, which cross Western Pomeranian Bodden country during migration, the Windwatten are one of the most important resting areas in Western Europe.
