= Schaprode =

- Municipality
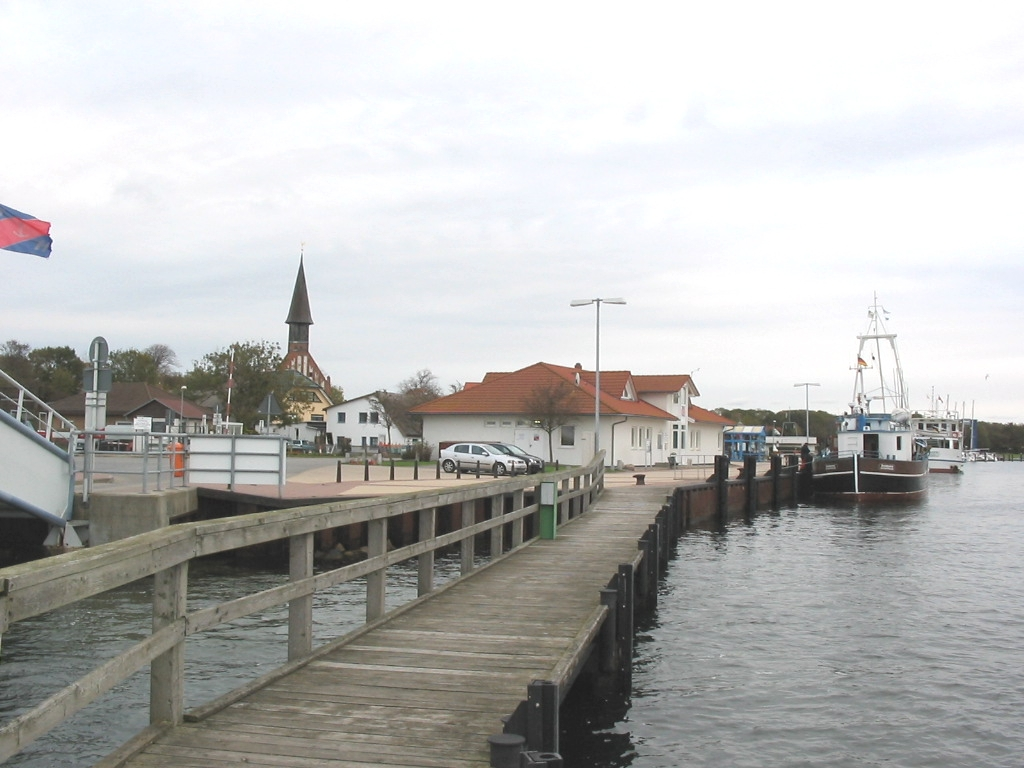
- Harbour of Schaprode

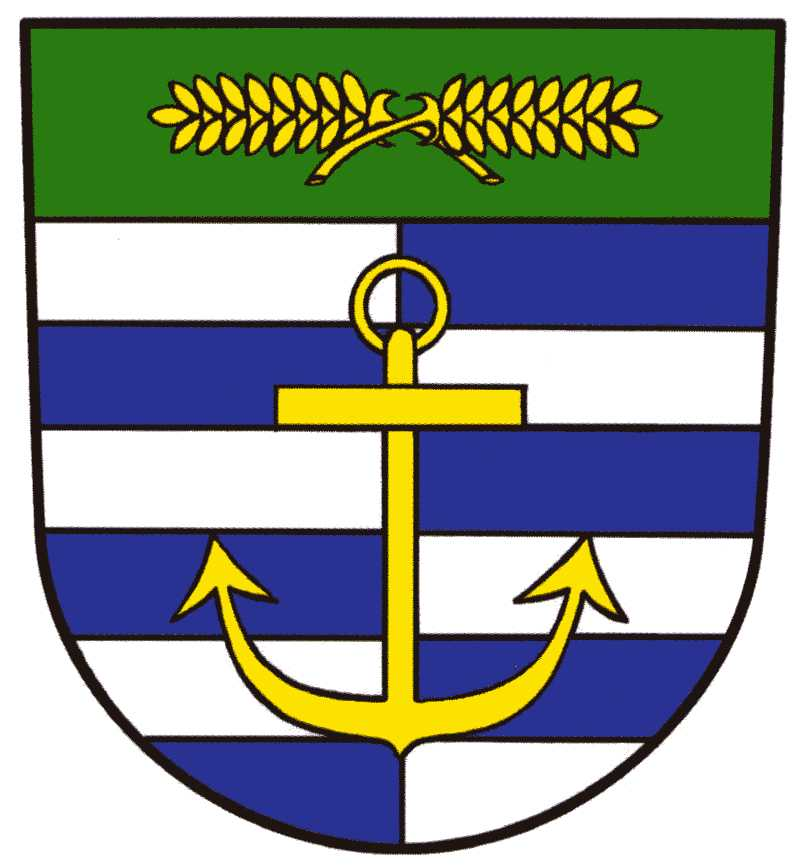
- Coat of arms

- Location of Schaprode within Vorpommern-Rügen district
- Interactive map of Schaprode
- Location within Germany Location within Mecklenburg-Vorpommern
- Coordinates: 54°30′48″N 13°9′58″E
- Country: Germany
- State: Mecklenburg-Vorpommern
- District: Vorpommern-Rügen
- Municipal assoc.: West-Rügen

Government
  - Mayor: Rüdiger Gau

Area
  - Total: 19.65 km^{2} (7.59 sq mi)
- Elevation: 3 m (9.8 ft)

Population (2025-12-31)
  - Total: 415
  - Density: 21.1/km^{2} (54.7/sq mi)
- Time zone: UTC+01:00 (CET)
  - Summer (DST): UTC+02:00 (CEST)
- Postal codes: 18569
- Dialling codes: 038309
- Vehicle registration: RÜG
- Website: www.amt-westruegen.de

Schaprode is a municipality in the Vorpommern-Rügen district, in Mecklenburg-Vorpommern, Germany.

== People ==
- Filip Julius Bernhard von Platen (1732–1805), Swedish politician and field marshal
