= Ummanz =

Island of Germany

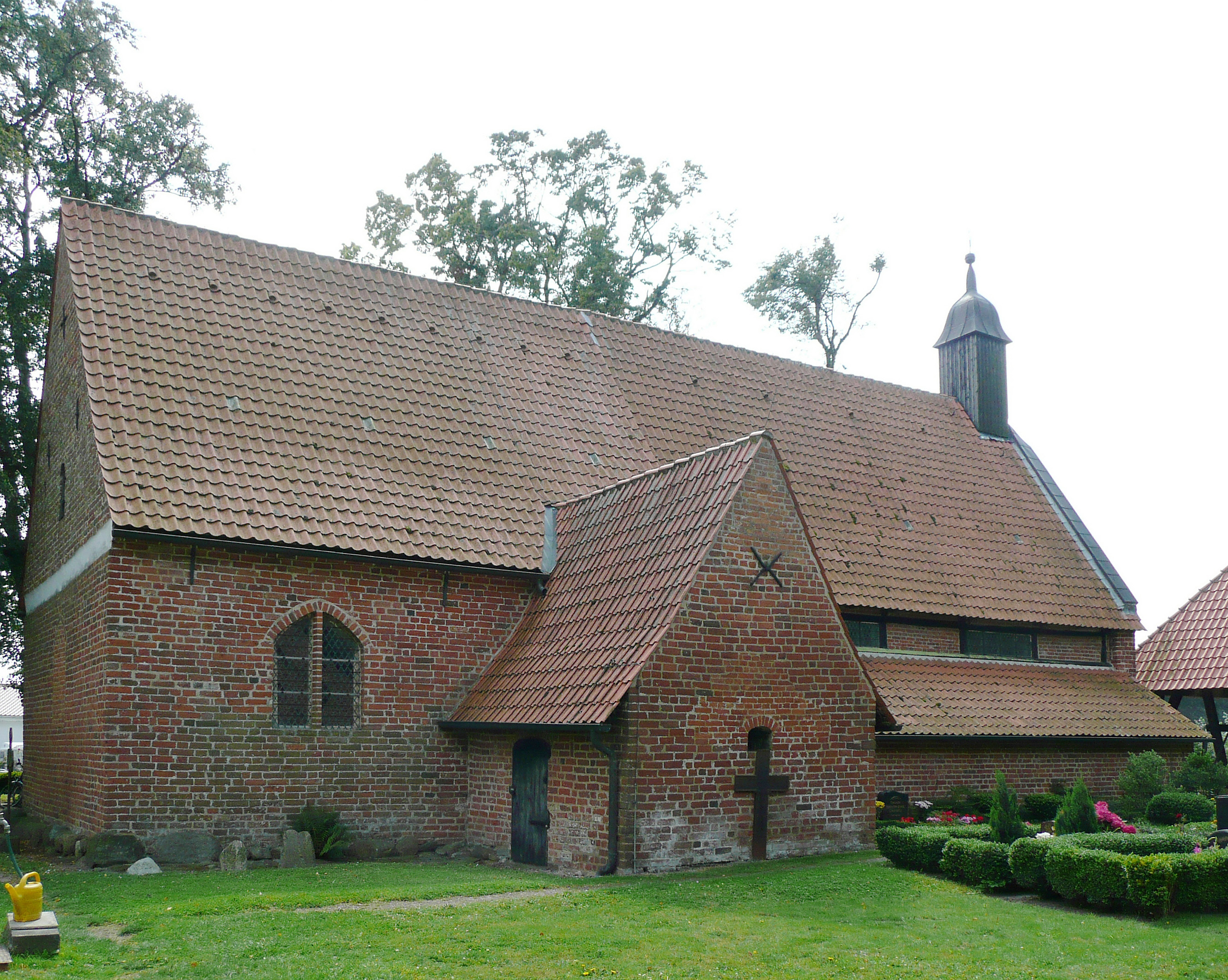
- St. Mary's Church, Waase

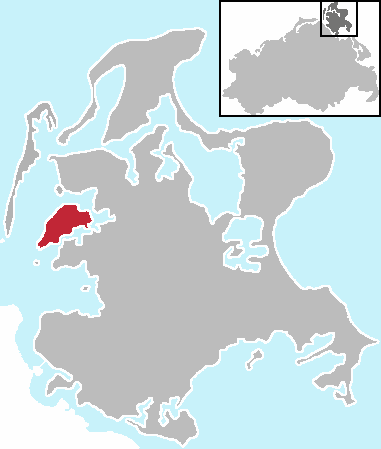

Geography
- Location: Baltic Sea
- Coordinates: 54°28′27″N 13°10′24″E
- Area: 20 km^{2} (7.7 sq mi)
- Highest elevation: 3 m (10 ft)

Administration
- Germany
- Largest settlement: Waase

Demographics
- Population: 274

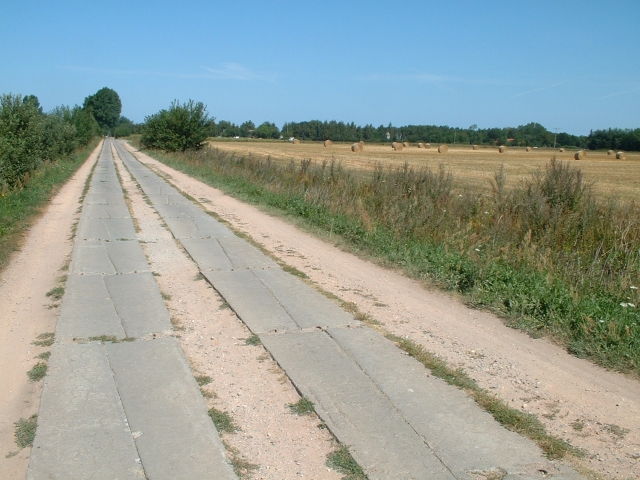
Slab track on Ummanz

Ummanz (German pronunciation: [ˈʊmants]) is an island in the Baltic Sea, off the west coast of the island of Rügen, and belongs, like the latter, to the county of Vorpommern-Rügen in the German state of Mecklenburg-Western Pomerania.

Ummanz is around 20 square kilometres in area and thus, after Rügen, the second largest island in the former county of Rügen. It is part of the Western Pomerania Lagoon Area National Park. The island is bounded to the west and northwest by the Schaproder Bodden, to the north, by the inlet of Udarser Wiek, to the east by the lake of Koselower See and the Breite and to the south by the Kubitzer Bodden. The island of Ummanz is very flat; its highest point lying just 3 metres above sea level (NN).

Since 1901 the island has been linked to the island of Rügen by a 250-metre-long bridge. The largest settlement on the island is the parish village of Waase; other villages are Haide, Markow, Suhrendorf, Freesenort, Tankow and Wusse. Together with several villages on Rügen itself it forms the municipality of Ummanz.

From 1341 the island was owned by the Heilgeisthospital at Stralsund. As a result, Stralsund's citizens exercised lordship over the island for centuries on behalf of the church foundation.
