= Barther Oie =

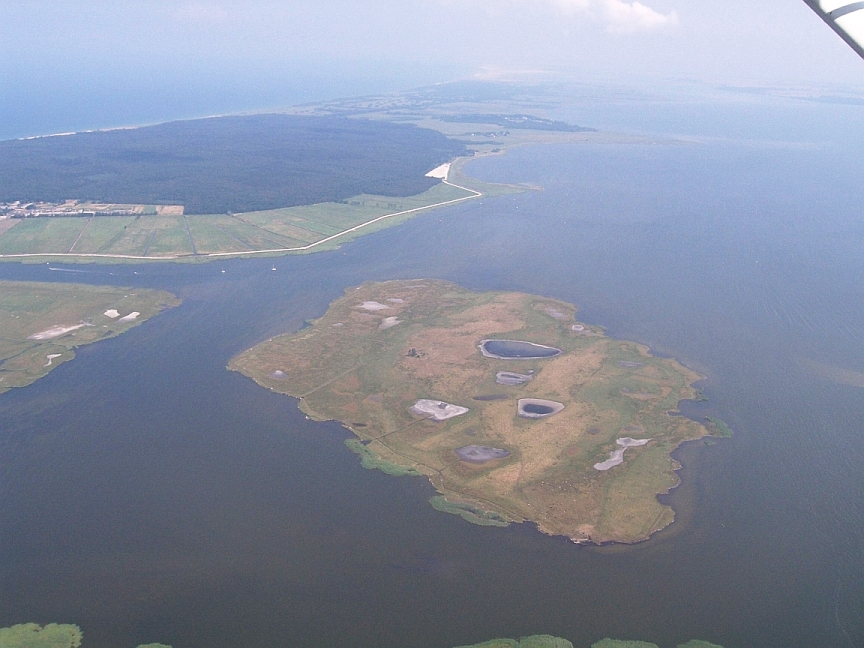
- Aerial photograph of Barther Oie

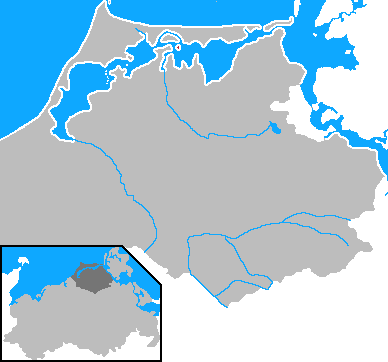
- Location of the island of Barther Oie

Geography
- Location: Barther Bodden
- Coordinates: 54°24′31″N 12°43′40″E
- Length: 0.850 km (0.5282 mi)
- Width: 0.800 km (0.4971 mi)
- Highest elevation: 1 m (3 ft)

Administration
- Germany

Demographics
- Population: 0

Barther Oie is an uninhabited island in the German federal state of Mecklenburg-Vorpommern and lies in the lagoon of Barther Bodden, between the town of Barth and the Baltic seaside resort of Zingst.

The Baltic Sea island has an area of about 850 by 800 metres (2,790 ft × 2,620 ft) and rises, like its sister island of Kirr, only 1 metre (3 ft 3 in) above sea level. Today, the island is part of the West Pomeranian Lagoon Area National Park and is designated as a nature reserve. To protect the nesting grounds of rare bird species, public access is prohibited. The island's geography consists of salt marshes and crossing tidal channels.
