= Bodstedter Bodden =

Lagoon in Germany

Coordinates: 54°23′31″N 12°37′33″E

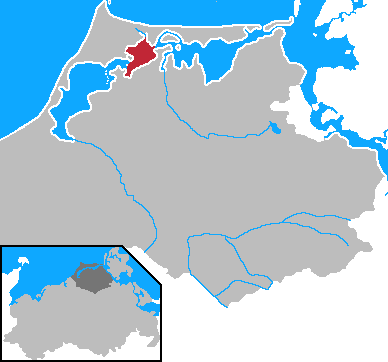
Location of the Bodstedter Bodden

The Bodstedter Bodden is a lagoon, of the type known as a bodden, that is part of the Darss-Zingst Bodden Chain and the Western Pomerania Lagoon Area National Park in northeastern Germany. It lies south of the peninsula of Fischland-Darß-Zingst on the coast of Mecklenburg-Vorpommern. The heavily indented, reed fringed shoreline forms a picturesque landscape with the result that the villages near the shore are popular tourist destinations.

The western boundary of the bodden with the Koppelstrom forms the so-called Borner Bülten (Bulte i.e. small swampy, islands of reed). The Koppelstrom is the transition to another lagoon, the Saaler Bodden. To the east the Bodstedter Bodden is separated from the Barther Bodden and Zingster Strom by the Meiningen Narrows. To the south of the bodden is the lake of Redensee and the village of Fuhlendorf. To the northeast, the Prerower Strom, a former estuary, empties into the bodden. The deepest point of the bodden (10 metres in depth) lies just in front of the Meininger Bülten, the small reed islands by Meiningen. The rest of the bodden is only rarely deeper than 3 metres.

== Villages on the Bodstedter Bodden ==
- Born a. Darß
- Fuhlendorf and the village of Bodstedt that gives the bodden its name.
- Wieck a. Darß
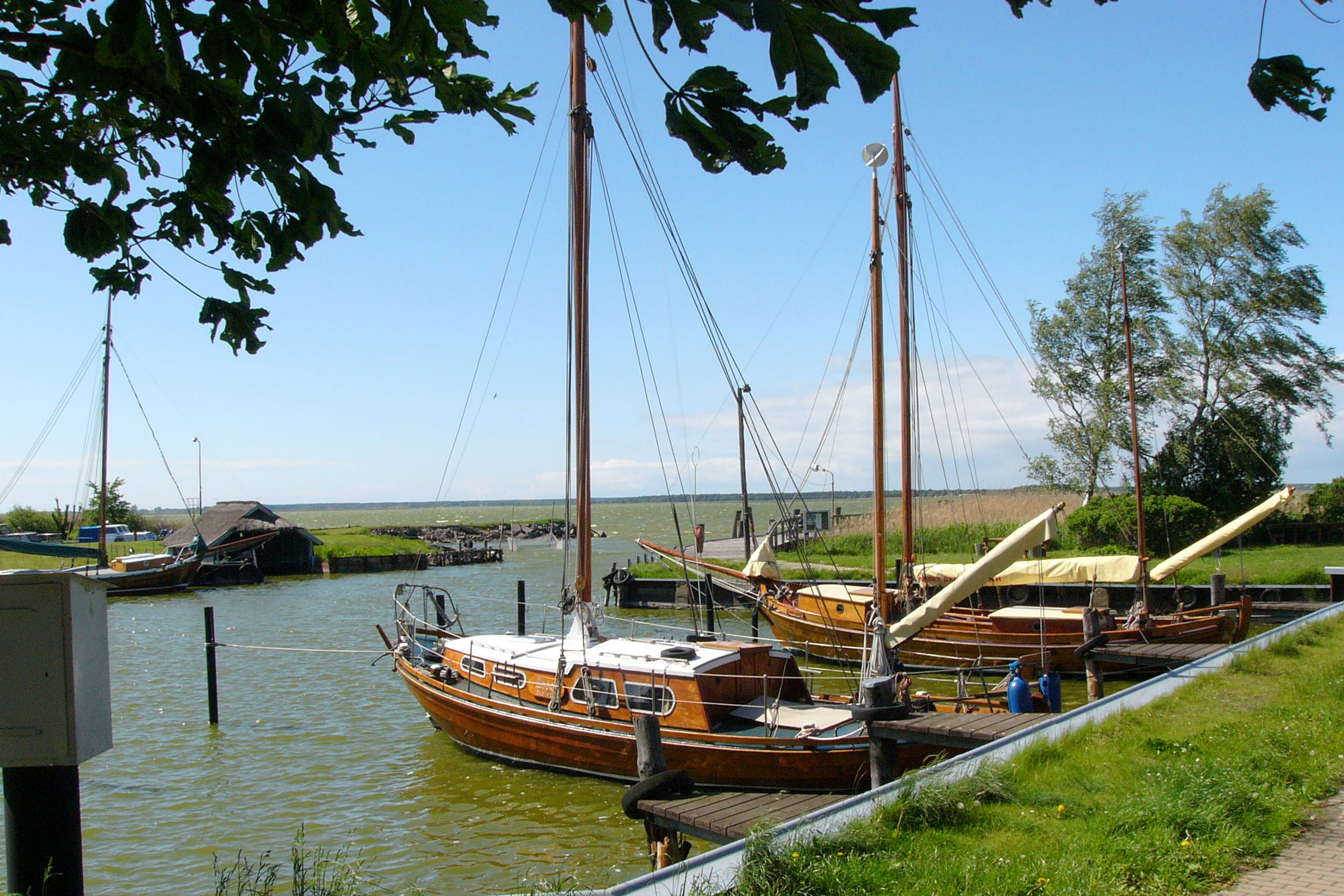
Old port in Bodstedt

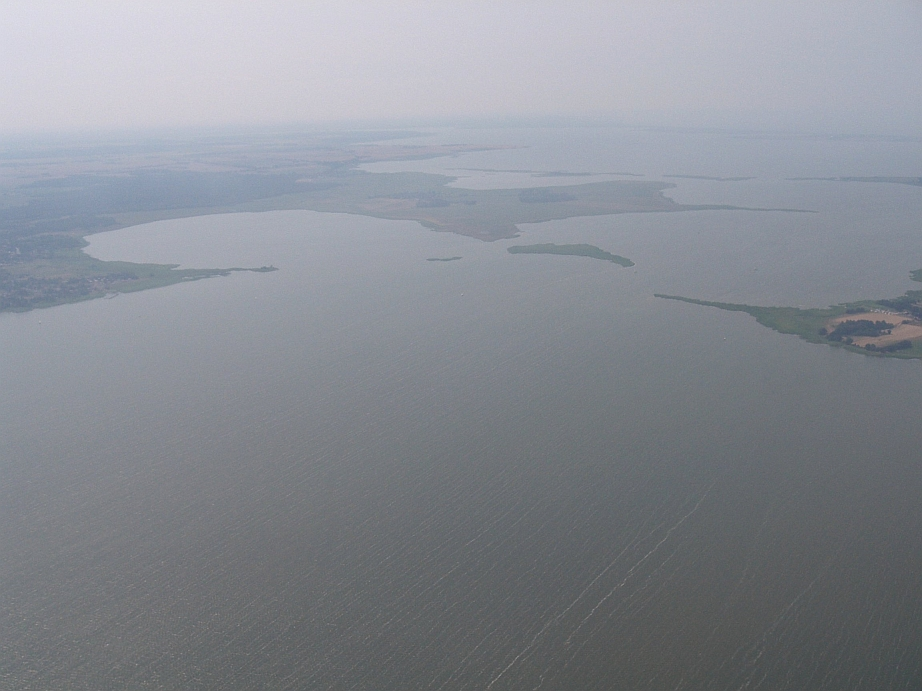
The Bodstedter Bodden and Redensee

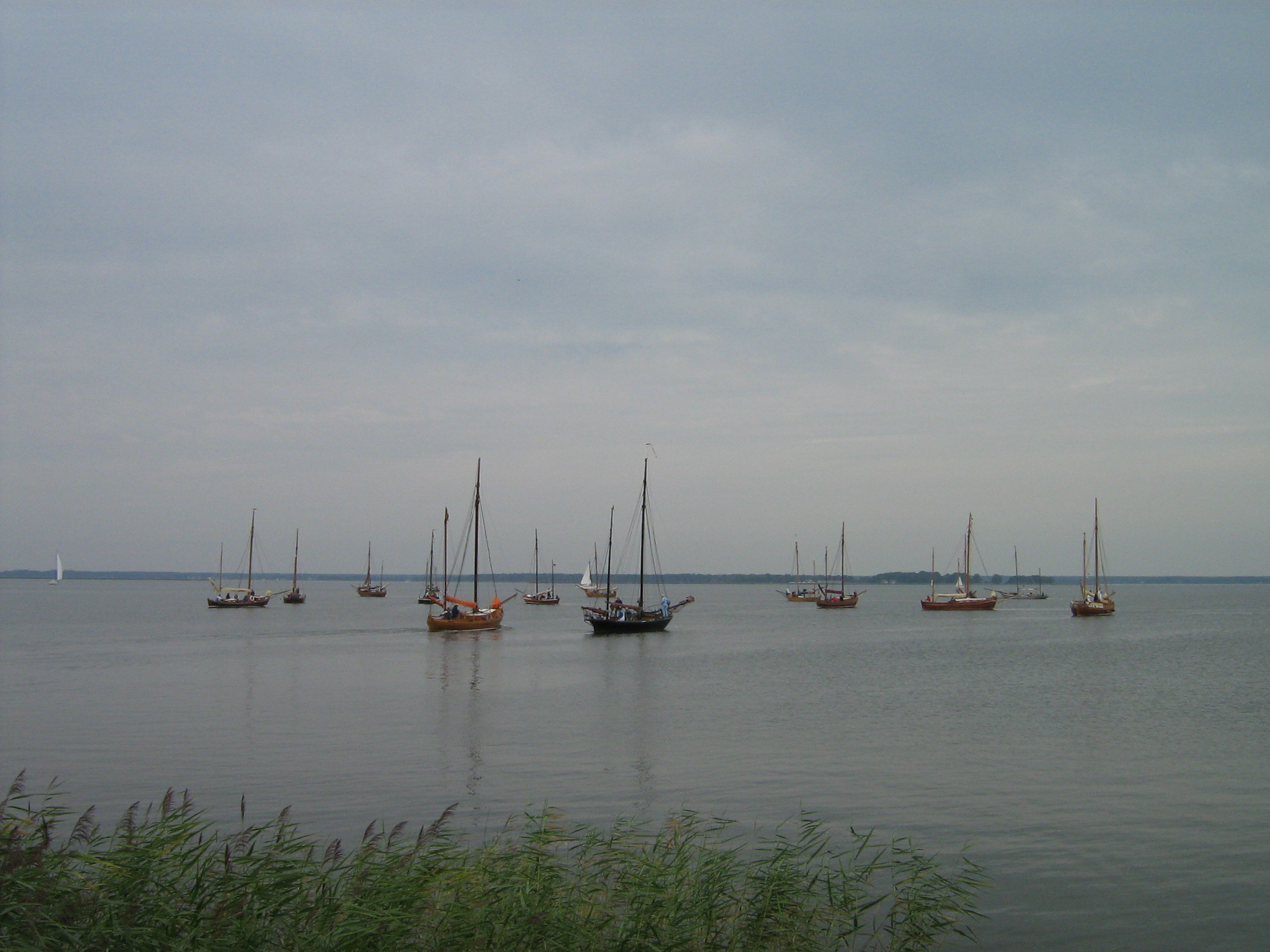
The Bodstedter Bodden seen from Bodstedt

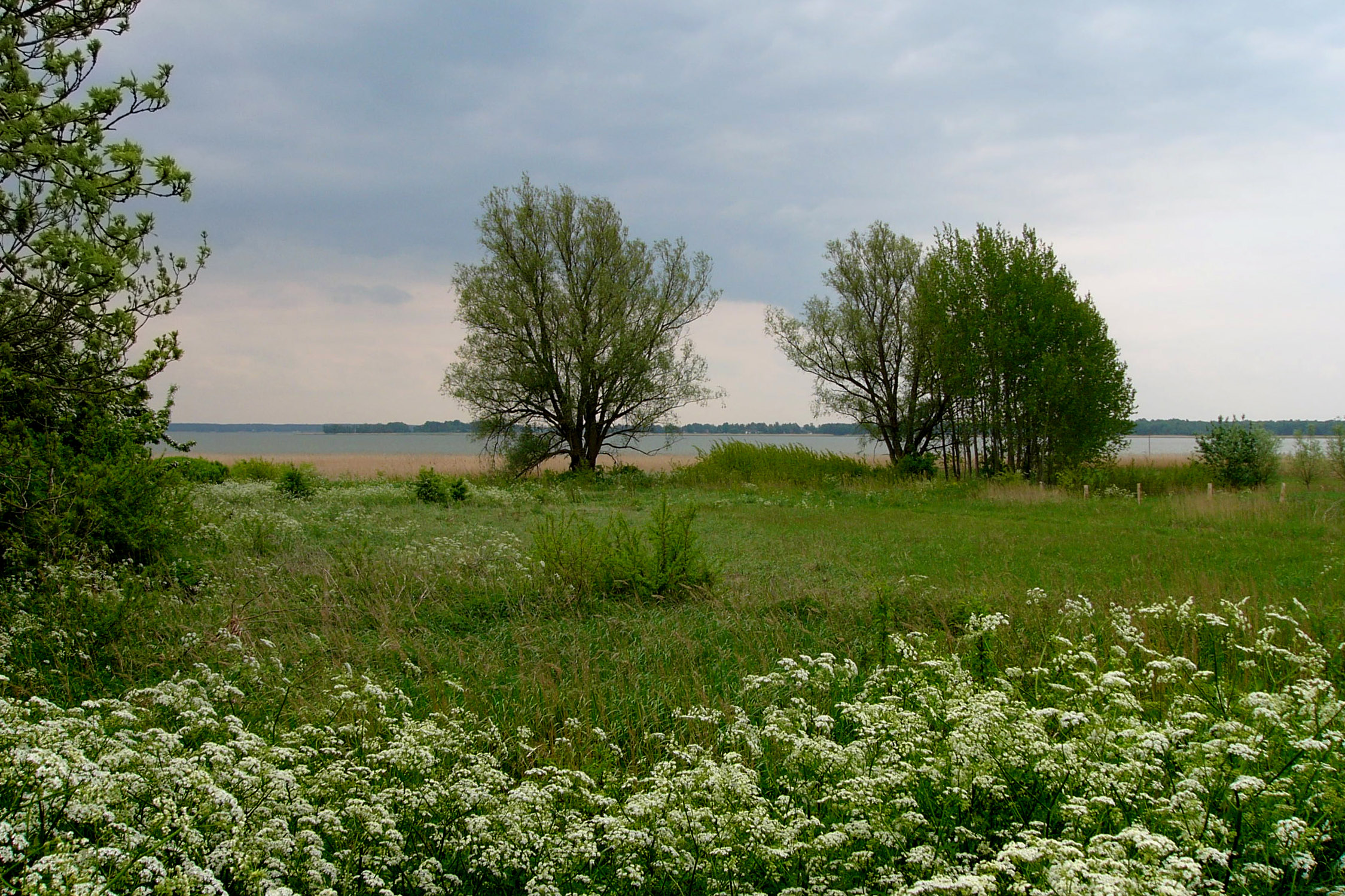
Typical landscape by Bodden
