= Kirr =

German island in the Baltic

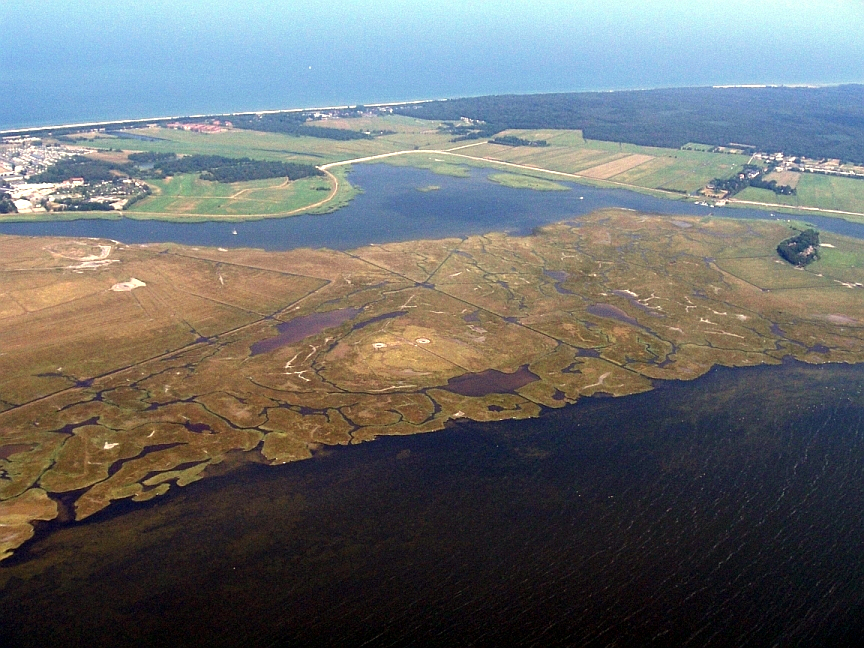
- Aerial photograph of the island of Kirr (foreground) and Zingst (background)

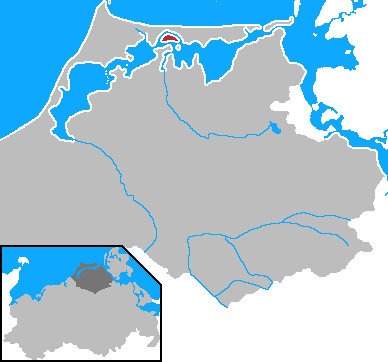
- Location of the island of Kirr

Geography
- Location: Baltic Sea
- Coordinates: 54°25′27″N 12°42′7″E
- Archipelago: Darss-Zingst Bodden Chain
- Length: 3.5 km (2.17 mi)
- Width: 1.5 km (0.93 mi)
- Highest elevation: 1 m (3 ft)

Administration
- Germany

Demographics
- Population: 0

Kirr (German pronunciation: [ˈkɪʁ]) is an island in the Darss-Zingst Bodden Chain south of the Zingst Peninsula on the German Baltic Sea coast. It is separated from the peninsula by the Zingster Strom. The island is a nature reserve within the Western Pomerania Lagoon Area National Park. It was formerly and is sometimes still called Großer Kirr or Große Kirr ("Great Kirr"). This is to distinguish it from the northwestern part of the island, which was still a separate albeit much smaller island in the Zingster Strom in the second half of the 20th century, that used to be called Kleiner Kirr or Kleine Kirr ("Small Kirr").

== Geography ==
The island has a length of 3.5 km, a maximum width of 1.5 km and only rises one metre above sea level. It lies in the lagoon of Barther Bodden on the Baltic Sea coast of north Germany, just a few metres south of the Baltic seaside resort of Zingst. On the east side of the island is the small hamlet of Klein Kirr; in the north are the ruins of an old farmstead.

== Flora and fauna ==
The island is covered by salt marshes and dissected by creeks. It is an ideal breeding ground for numerous birds, especially waders like dunlin, ruff, redshank, black-tailed godwit, oystercatcher, avocet and lapwing as well as the black-headed gull. In autumn the island acts as a resting place for several thousand crane over several weeks as they migrate south. As a consequence of its natural importance, walking on the island or landing boats there without permission is forbidden.

== History ==
Around 1700, the Kirr had three owners, the Amt of Barth (331.6 hectares), the town of Barth (219 hectares) and the Horn family from Divitz (20 hectares). The island was managed by a farmstead and was mainly used by several tenants who grazed cattle and raised crops. They were also allowed to fish around the island. Today the Kirr is still used for cattle pasture. In order to get the cows to their grazing fields there is a cattle ferry to the island from the village of Müggenburg.

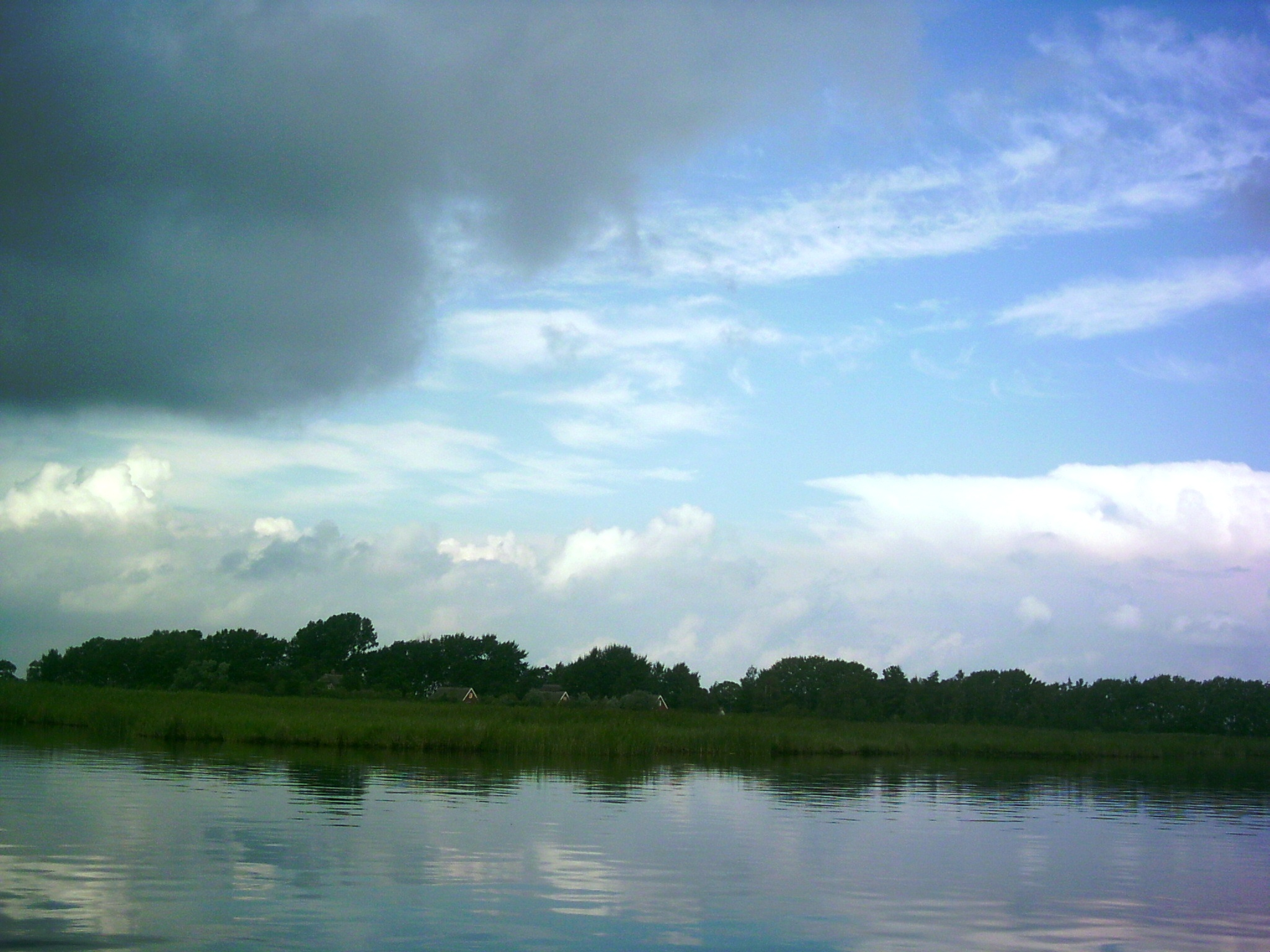
Klein Kirr on the island of Kirr

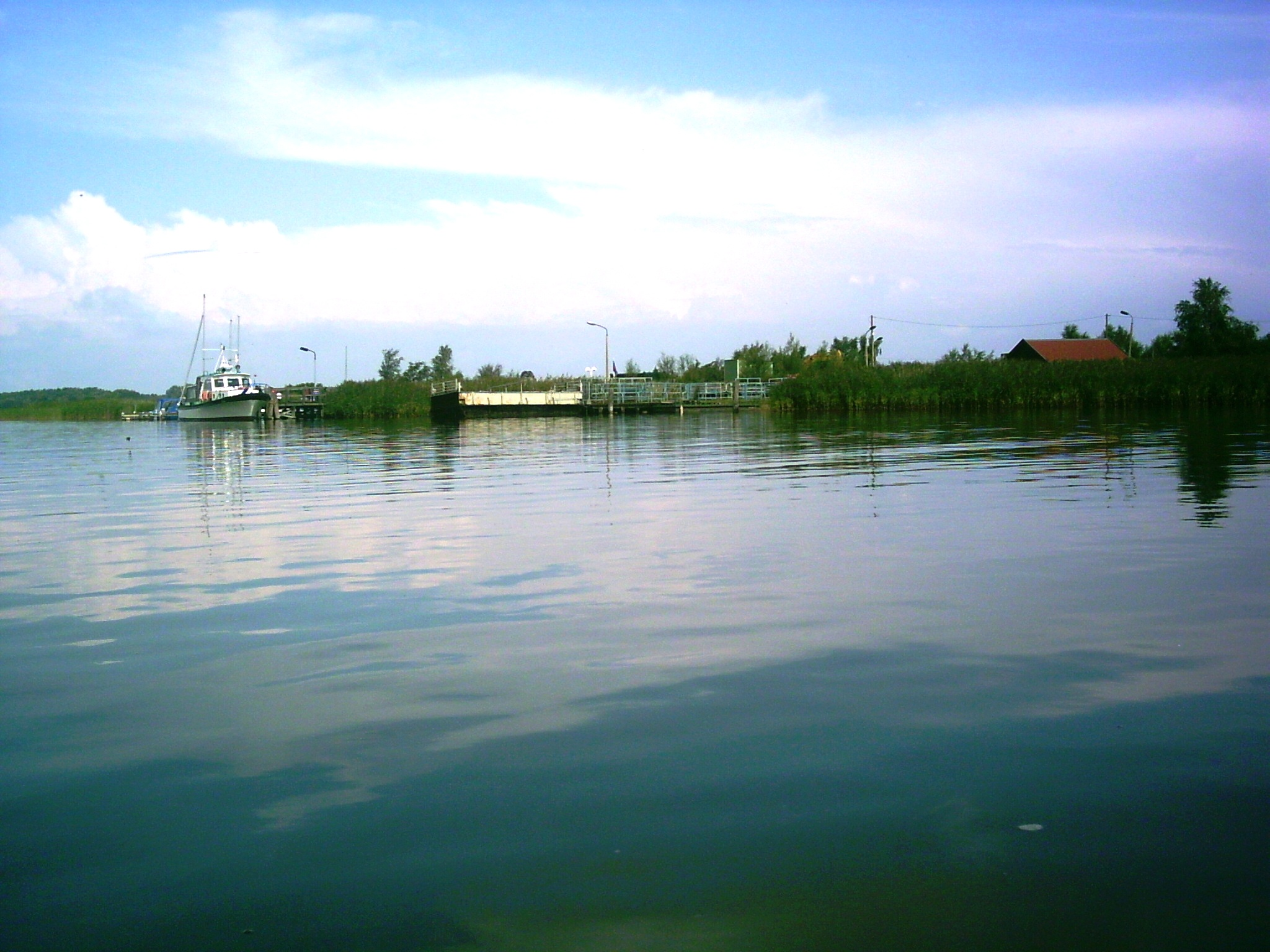
Cow ferry to the island of Kirr
