= Gellen =

Peninsula in Germany

Coordinates: 54°29′5.8164″N 13°4′6.89″E

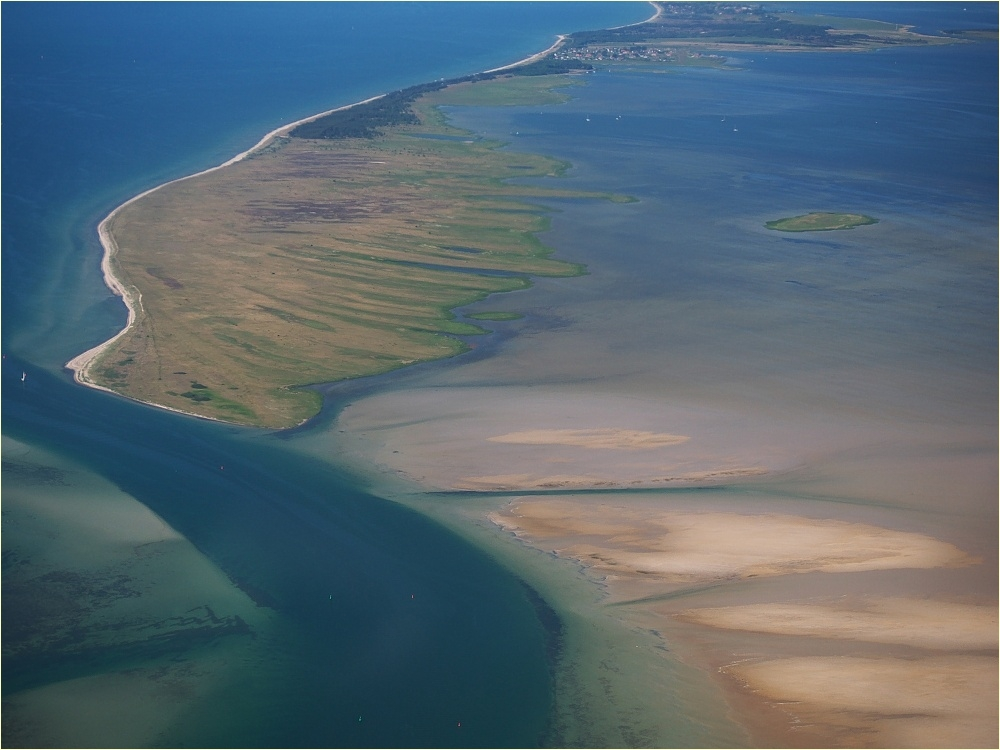
Gellen Peninsula in the south of the island of Hiddensee

The Gellen or Gellen Peninsula (German: Halbinsel Gellen) is a spit at the southern end of the island of Hiddensee off the north German Baltic coast. Its southern part is protected as an important bird reserve and is part of protection zone I of the Western Pomerania Lagoon Area National Park. It is therefore not accessible to the public.

It consists of post-ice age sand depositions and is growing annually by a few metres to the south. The dredging of the shipping channel between the island of Bock and the Gellen prevents a graded shoreline from being formed, which would otherwise be typical of the eastern Baltic Sea area with its numerous spits.

== Topography ==
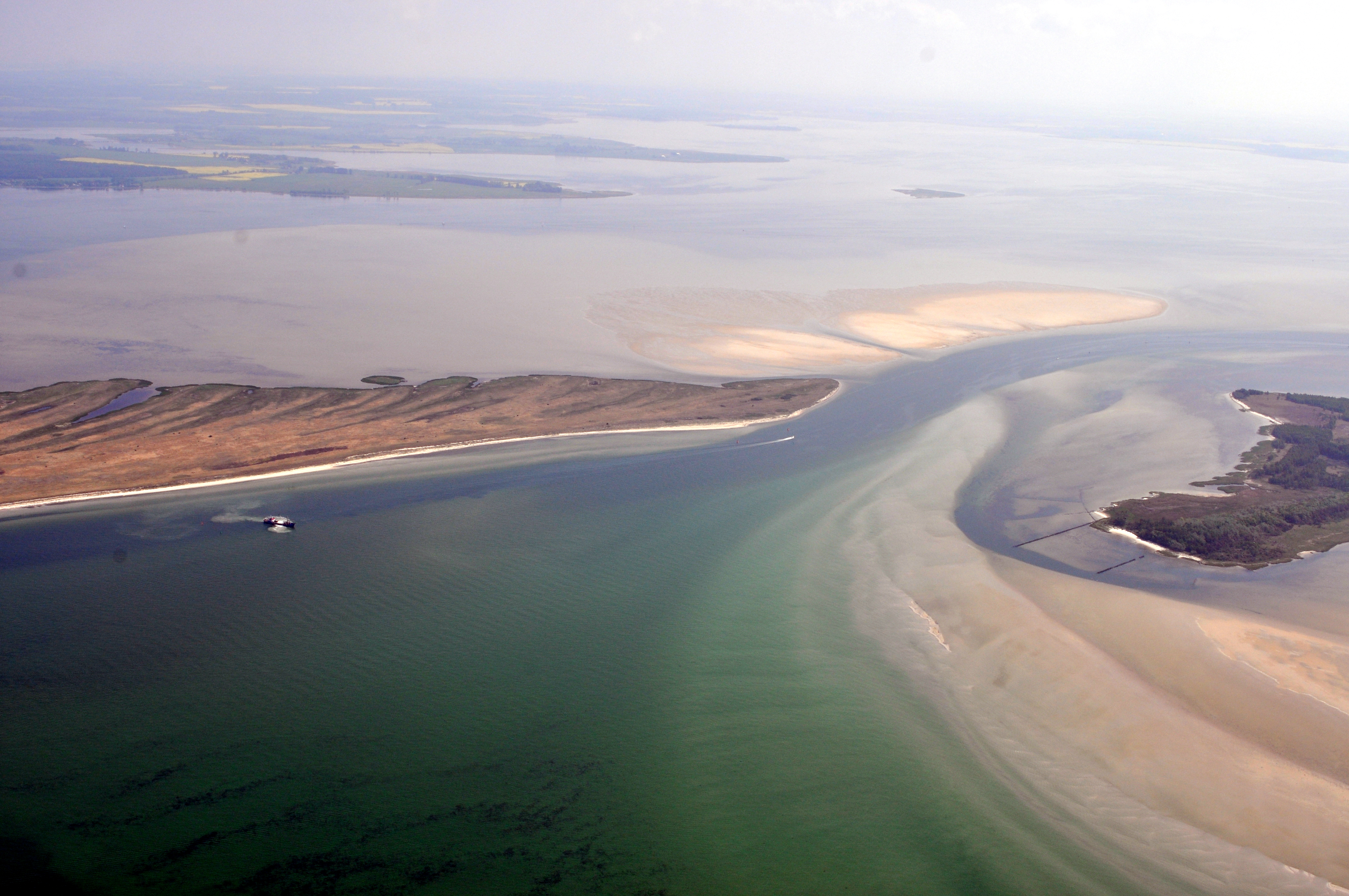
Southern tip in May 2011

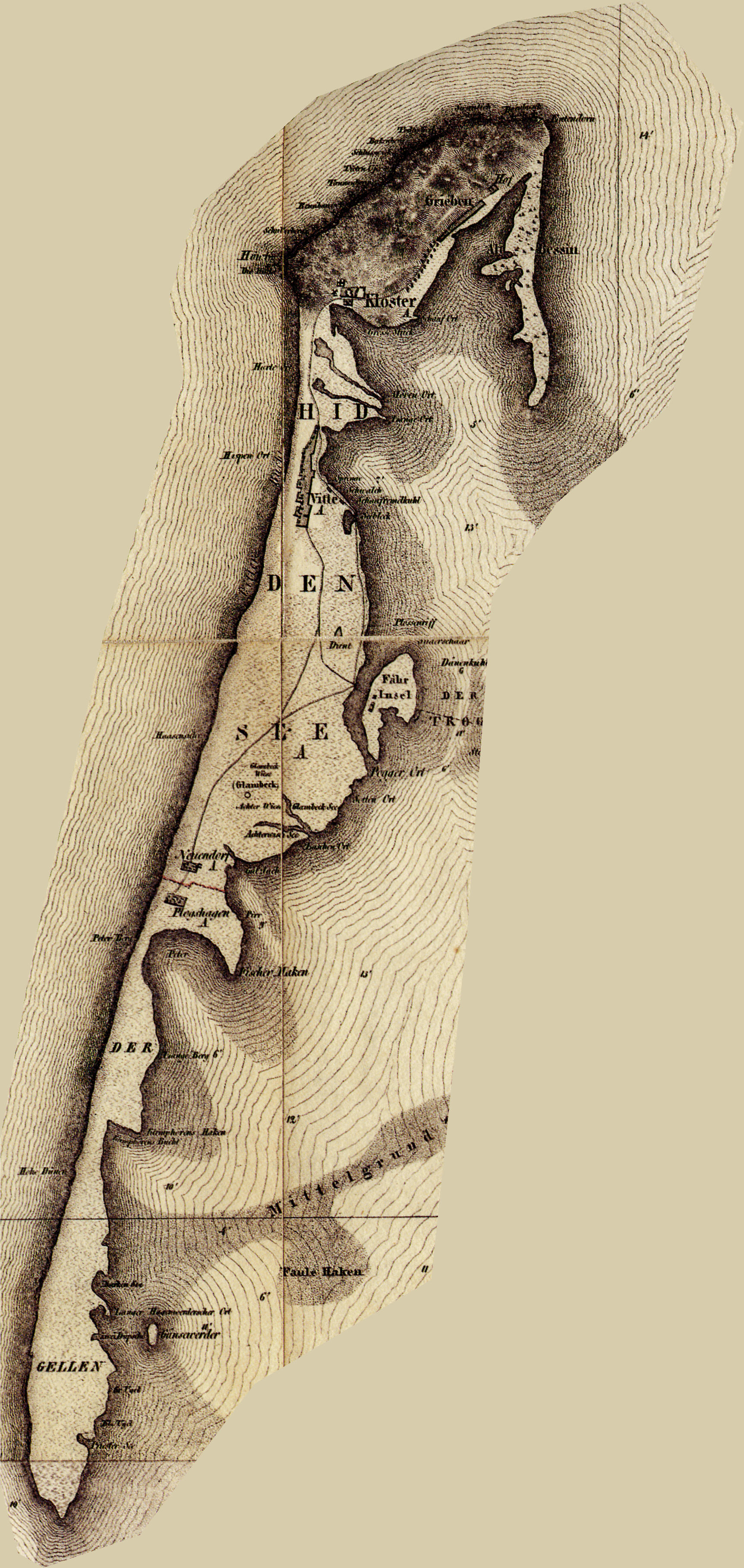
1829 map of Hiddensee showing the Gellen

The peninsula is a maximum of 500 metres wide and ca. 5 kilometres long, but only a few metres high. Its individual berms may be clearly seen. Topographically it may be divided into two areas:

- Altgellen (Neuendorf to Klimphores Bay)
- Neugellen (Klimphores Bay to the southern tip), formed from about 12th century. The southern part of the Neugellen is closed.

Whilst the Neugellen grows southwards, sand is removed from Altgellen. South of the Gellen is an extensive wind-affected mudflat or Windwatt, the Vierendehlgrund, which is occasionally exposed. The growth of the Gellen has slowed down considerably since about 1990 and will eventually cease in the coming decades because it will come up against the shipping channel to the southwest.

Place names on the Gellen from north to south:

- Points and headlands: Langer Barg, Klimphores/Klemmhuern Spit (Klimphoreshaken/Klemmhuernhaken), Langen Hasenwerderscher Ort, Kl. Ugel, Gr. Ugel
- Bays and inlets (Riegen): Schwarzer Peter, Klemmhuern/Klimphores Bay (Klimphoresbucht), Karkensee, Priestersee

On the western shore of the Neugellen is a sea cliff up to four metres high, which unlike the Dornbusch has its origins in dune formation, not ice age depositions. On the Altgellen is a coastal defence wood of wind-resistant Scots Pine has been planted; further south there are also a few individual birches and other trees. Most of it is covered with dune grasses, poor grassland and heath, however.

== Coastal defences ==
In 1864, a storm surge drove an 8 metre deep breach through the peninsula south of Neuendorf, at the so-called Schwarzer Peter ("Black Peter"). In spite of intensive attempts, it could not be closed in the succeeding decades; instead it widened to 250 metres. Only after the construction of the stone embankment was the Gellen peninsula finally rejoined to Hiddensee island. Today there is the risk of another breach in the area of the Klimphores Bay. There the land is only 250 metres wide. Groynes (some even made of stone), beach nourishment, artificial dunes and the planting of Beachgrass and pines are being used to counteract the abrasion of the coastline.

== Buildings ==
In the early 14th century, Gellen Church (Gellenkirche), a small beacon (called Luchte) and the first harbour were built on the island of Hiddensee. The name Karkensee (Kirchensee or "church lake") for a bay by the barrier on South Gellen still bears witness to the old church. A light beacon, which marks the northern entrance of the so-called Gellenstrom channel, still stands on the peninsula.

== Literature ==
- Günter Möbus: Wie Hiddensee zur Insel wurde. Helms Verlag, Schwerin 2001, ISBN 3-931185-87-7
