= Grabow (bodden) =

Bodden in Germany

Coordinates: 54°23′17″N 12°50′9″E

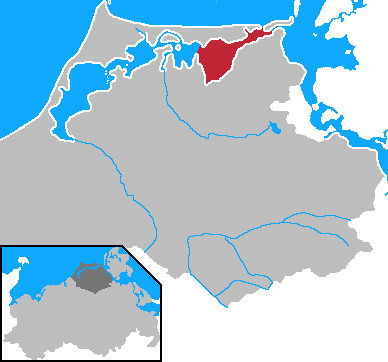
Location of the Grabow

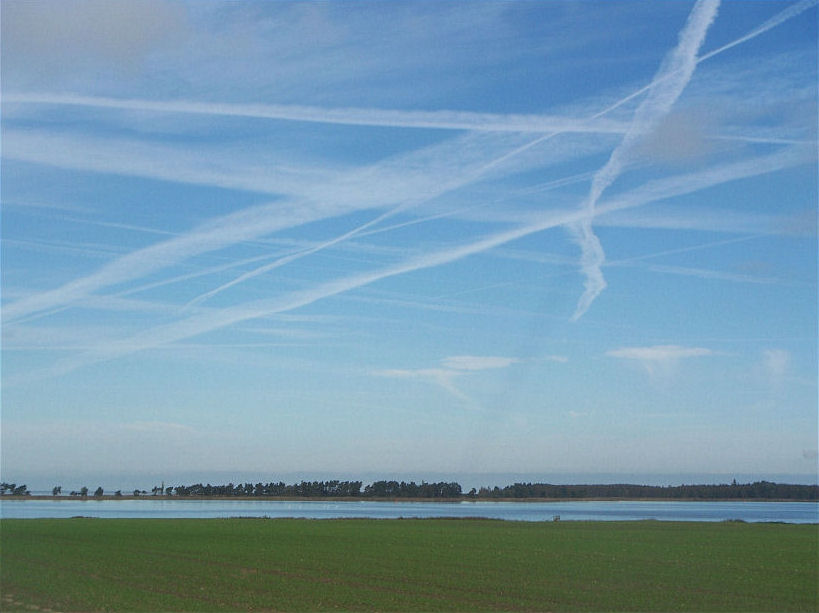
Bodden coast near Nisdorf

The Grabow (German pronunciation: [ˈɡʁaːboː]) is a bodden - a lagoon-like waterbody - off the Baltic Sea south of the Zingst and Großer Werder peninsulas and the island group of Kleiner Werder.

It lies on the coast of the German state of Mecklenburg-Vorpommern between Stralsund and Barth and forms the eastern part of the Darss-Zingst Bodden Chain. Its northern part belongs to the Western Pomerania Lagoon Area National Park.

There are three hamlets on the shores of the Grabow: Nisdorf und Kinnbackenhagen in the municipality of Groß Mohrdorf and Dabitz in the municipality of Kenz-Küstrow.

The Grabow is a popular fishing lake.
