= Darss-Zingst Bodden Chain =

Waterbody on the Baltic Sea coast, Germany

Coordinates: 54°23′36″N 12°37′04″E

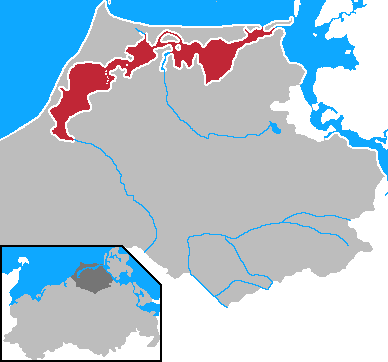
The location of the Darss-Zingst Bodden Chain

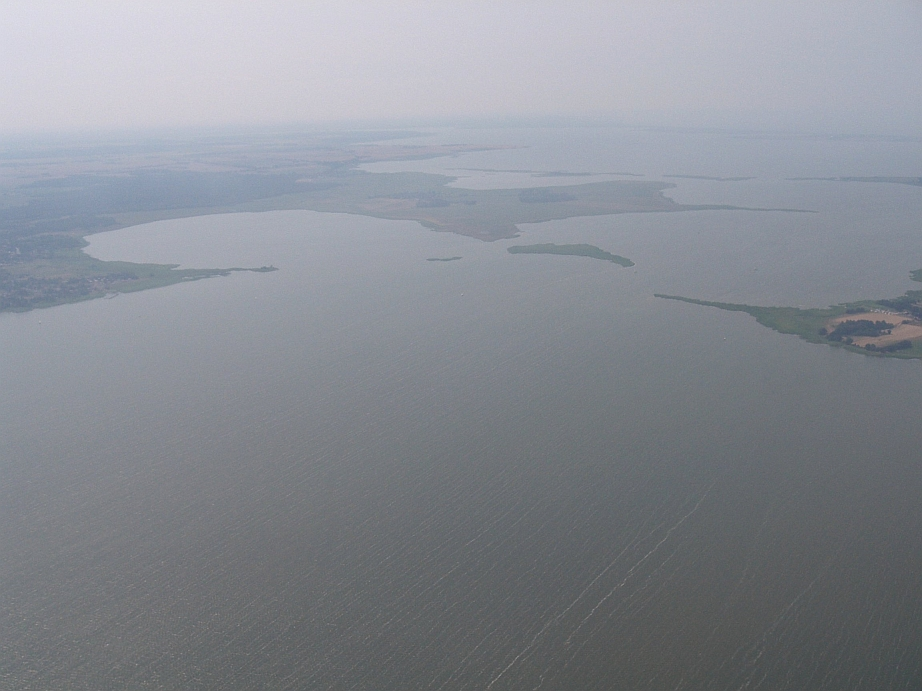
The Bodstedter and Saaler Bodden from the air

The Darss-Zingst Bodden Chain (German: Darß-Zingster Boddenkette) is a waterbody on the Baltic Sea coast northeast of Rostock in Germany. It consists of a string of several lagoons or bodden arranged in an east–west direction that are separated from the open sea by the Fischland-Darß-Zingst peninsula. The surface area of these lagoons is 197 km^{2} and the average water depth is only about two metres.

The individual lagoons of the Darss-Zingst Bodden Chain are the:

- Saaler Bodden
- Bodstedter Bodden
- Barther Bodden and
- Grabow

(listed from west to east; not mentioned here are several smaller stretches of interlinking water).

The salt content of the water rises from west to east, because only at the eastern end of the bodden chain is there a link to the Baltic Sea via the Gellenstrom stream and the small opening between Großer Werder and Kleiner Werder, where the waters are able to mix. There used to be other links to the sea like the Prerowstrom stream to the north (dammed after 1872) and the Permin and Loop by Fischland to the west (dammed in the 14th century). The rivers Recknitz and Barthe discharge into the Darss-Zingst Bodden Chain and, in all, it has catchment area of 1,578 km^{2}. On the south shore of the bodden chain lie the towns of Ribnitz-Damgarten and Barth.

The northern part of the Darss-Zingst Bodden Chain belongs to the Western Pomerania Lagoon Area National Park.

== See also ==
- North Rügen Bodden
- West Rügen Bodden

== Literature ==
- Ulf Karsten, Rhena Schumann, Kathrin Witte: Darß-Zingster Boddengewässer: Filter zwischen Land und See. Biologie in unserer Zeit 33(1), p. 46–55 (2003), ISSN 0045-205X
