= Großer Werder (Zingst) =

Coordinates: 54°26′24″N 12°56′13″E

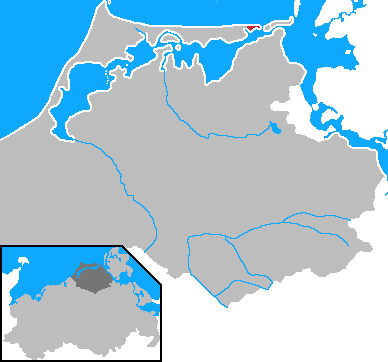
Location of the former island of Großer Werder

The peninsula of Großer Werder lies southwest of the Hiddensee, west of the island of Bock and is joined to the peninsula of Zingst to the east. It belongs to the district of Vorpommern-Rügen in northeast Mecklenburg-Vorpommern in Germany.

The Große Werder was inhabited until the first half of the 20th century. Due to the solitary location of its only farmstead, the island was also given the nickname Ostsee-Hallig ("Baltic Sea Hallig" – a hallig being a desolate, marshy, North Sea island off the Jutland coast). Today the island is part of the municipality of Groß Mohrdorf and is a nature reserve belonging to the West Pomeranian Lagoon Area National Park. South of the island is the Grabow bodden and to the north lies the Baltic Sea. As a result of increasing siltation of the inlet at the eastern tip of the Zingst, the Große Werder became a peninsula (as at summer 2006). This phenomenon occurred in the 1970s and 1980s and, as a result, depending on the date and the base material used, the peninsula may either appear as a peninsula or an island.
