= Bodden =

Bodies of water near the Baltic Sea

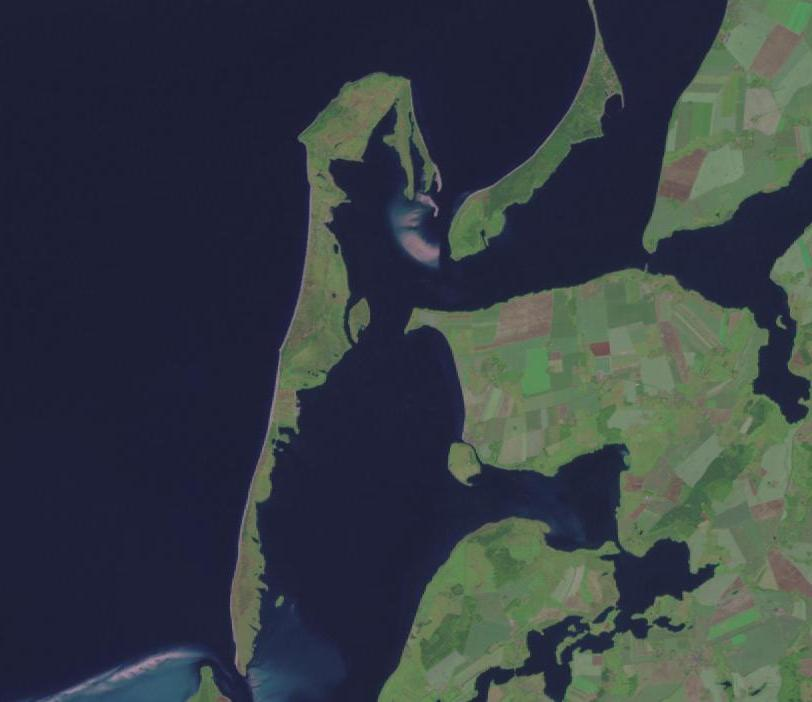
Part of the West Rügen bodden chain (centre), separated from the Baltic Sea (left) by the seahorse-shaped island of Hiddensee; seen from Landsat

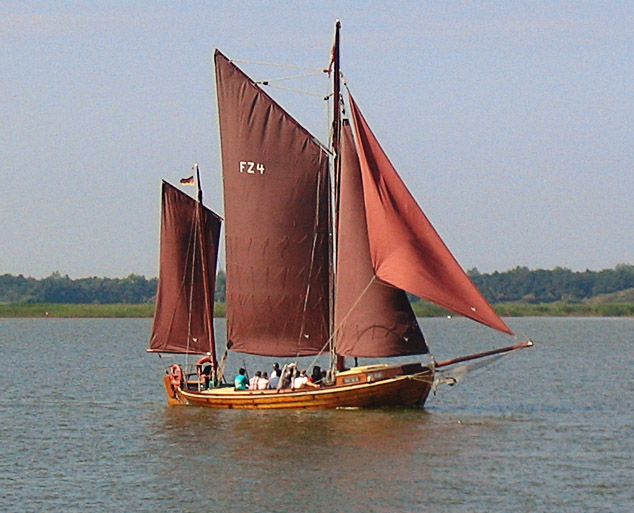
Zeesenboot, a traditional type of fishing boat used in bodden areas

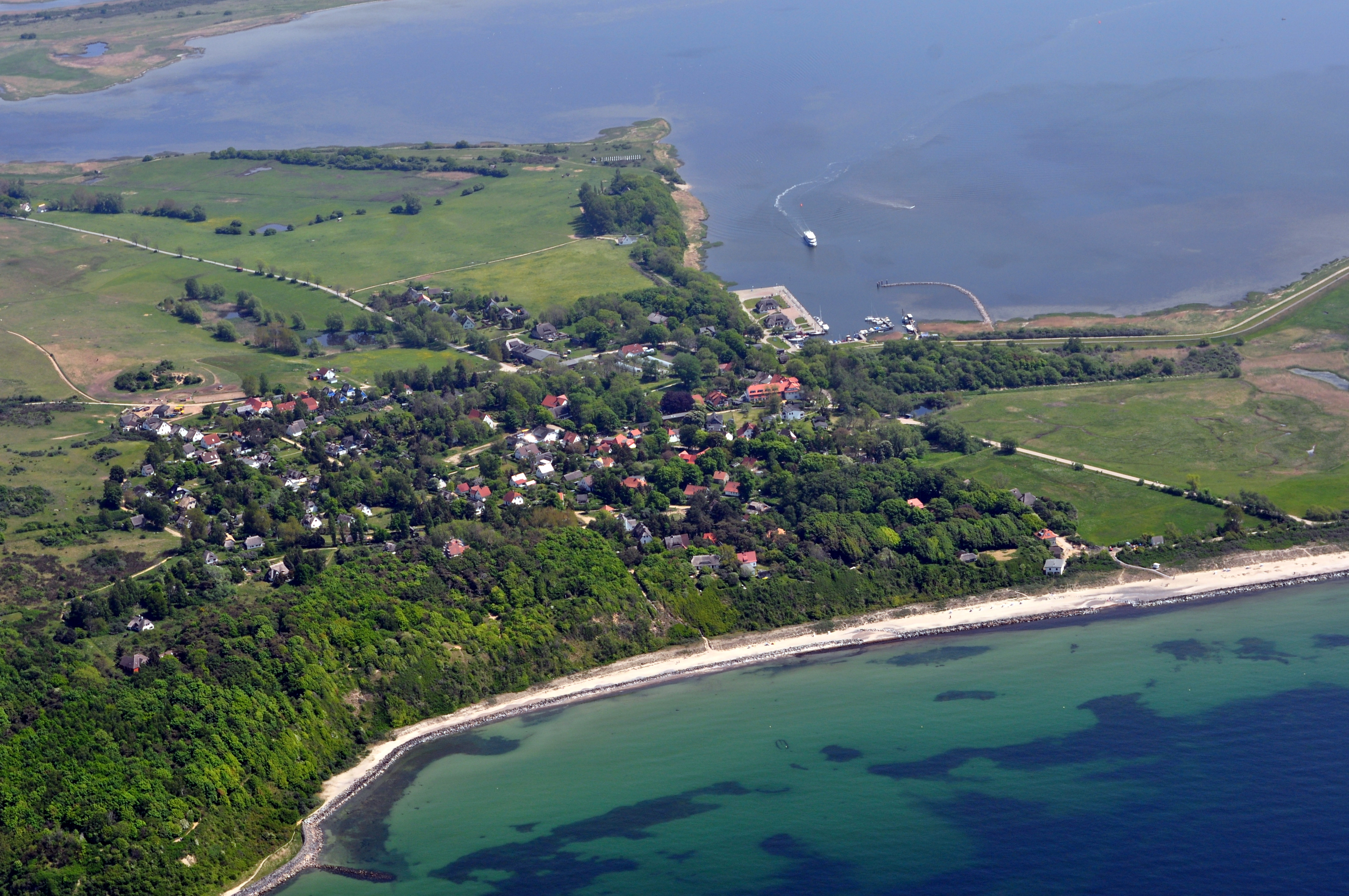
Island of Hiddensee, Vitte Lagoon in the rear, Baltic Sea beach in the front.

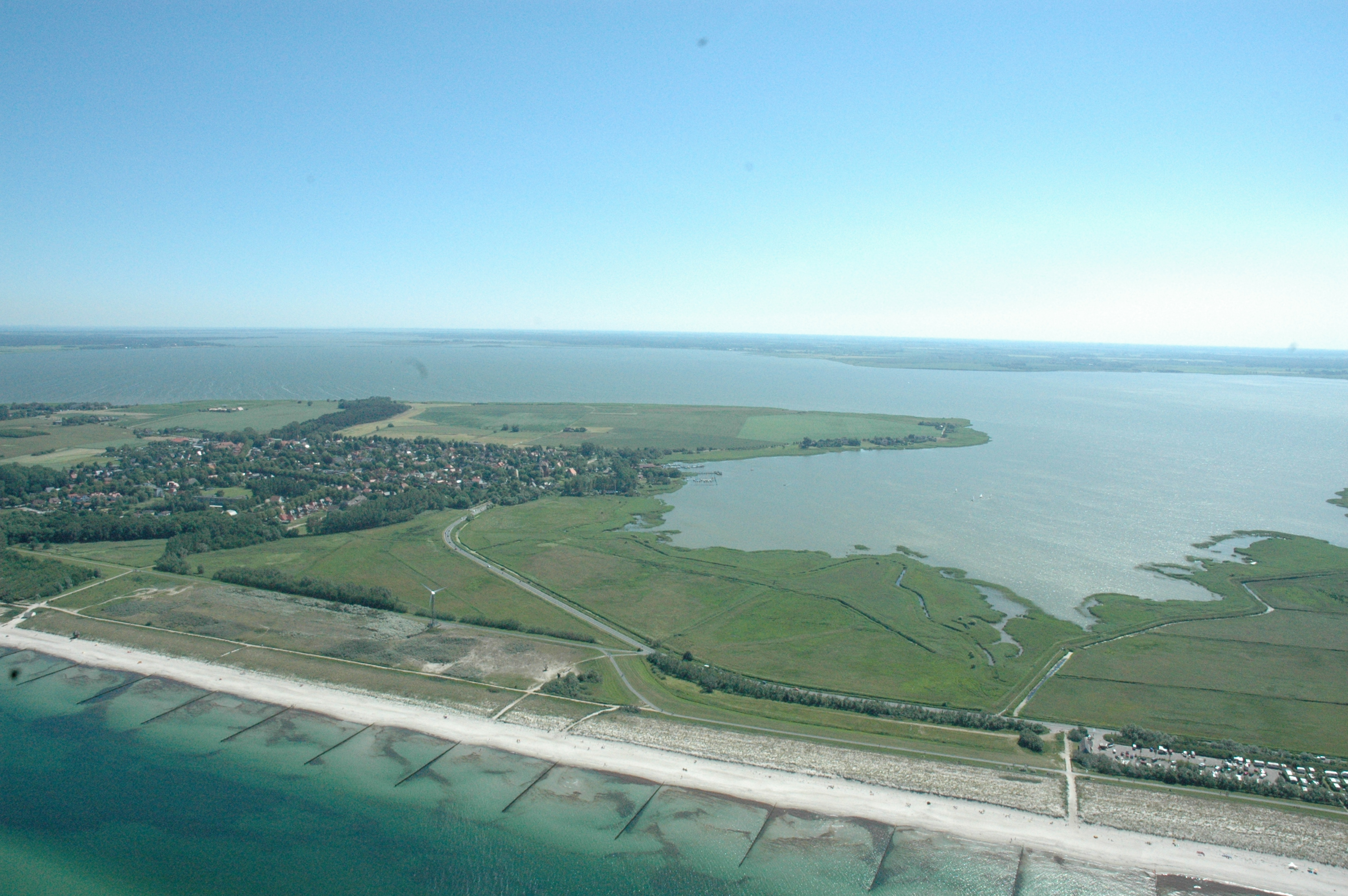
Aerial view of Saaler Bodden with Permin Bay, separated from the Baltic Sea (bottom left) by the narrow Fischland peninsula

Bodden (German pronunciation: [ˈbɔdn̩]) are briny bodies of water often forming lagoons, along the southwestern shores of the Baltic Sea, primarily in Germany's state of Mecklenburg-Vorpommern. These lagoons can be found especially around the island of Rügen, Usedom and the Fischland-Darss-Zingst peninsula. Some of them are protected reserves, forming the Western Pomerania Lagoon Area National Park.

They have a distinctive geological origin and are enclosed by peninsulas, spits and islands, leaving only narrow connections to adjacent bodden or the open sea. Freshwater inflow from the mainland and saltwater inflow from the open sea, which depends on wind direction and force as well as the proximity of the bodden to the sea, result in fluctuating salt gradients and distinctive ecosystems.

During the Littorina Sea transgression, an island archipelago was formed by the carving of narrow glacial basins and channels resulting from meltwater. Bodden were formed in a comparatively short period between spits and offshore sandbars. These shallow glacial scoops were then subjected to extensive sedimentation during the Holocene, resulting in lakes with depths of no more than 4–6 metres. Thermal and saline stratification is extremely unstable under these conditions, and bodden have the typical dynamics of small bodies of water with a sea connection, which is a rapid filling and draining due to tidal and wind action, and inflow of fresh water. The frequent movement of water can lead to a scouring effect, but can also with heavy pollution show a tendency toward eutrophication. Due to erosion of cliffs and sedimentary deposition, the shape of the bodden coasts remains unstable. Sudden changes have been caused by stormfloods, which repeatedly closed connections to the sea or opened new ones in the past.

Bodden-type bays can be found in Mecklenburg, and in Denmark, where they are called Nor (da). However, the most typical bodden are located off the Pomeranian mainland between the mouth of the Recknitz river and the island of Usedom. Several adjacent bodden between the Fischland-Darß-Zingst peninsula, Hiddensee, the northern and western peninsulae of Rügen and the Pomeranian mainland are grouped as Bodden chains (Boddenketten):

- Darss-Zingst Bodden Chain (Darß-Zingster Boddenkette), consisting of (from west to east)
  - Saaler Bodden with Ribnitzer See and Permin, connected by Koppelstrom to
  - Bodstedter Bodden with Redensee and Prerower Strom, connected by Meiningen to
  - Barther Bodden with Zingster Strom
  - Grabow
- West Rügen bodden chain (Westrügensche Boddenkette or Rügensche Außenboddenkette), consisting of (from south to north)
  - Kubitzer Bodden with Prohner Wiek and Gellenstrom
  - Schaproder Bodden with Udarser Wiek and Koselower See
  - Vitter Bodden, connected to the Baltic Sea by Libben
- North Rügen bodden chain (Nordrügensche Boddenkette), consisting of (from west to east)
  - Wieker Bodden, connected by Rassower Strom to Schaproder Bodden and
  - Breetzer Bodden with Neuendorfer Wiek,
  - Breeger Bodden
  - Lebbiner Bodden with Tetzitzer See
  - Großer Jasmunder Bodden with Mittelsee and Spykerscher See, connected by a narrow ditch to
  - Kleiner Jasmunder Bodden

Another bodden is the Bay of Greifswald (Greifswalder Bodden), the northern parts of which constitute the Rügischer Bodden with Schoritzer Wiek, Wreechensee, Having Inlet with Neuensiener See and Selliner See, and Hagensche Wiek. To the south, the Bay of Greifswald comprises Gristower Inwiek, Kooser See and Dänische Wieck (Danish Bay).

The Bay of Greifswald is connected to the West Rügen bodden chain by the Strelasund, a bodden-type strait with Glewitzer Wiek, Puddeminer Wiek and Deviner See; it is further connected to the Oder Lagoon by the Peenestrom, another bodden-type strait with Spandowerhagener Wiek, Krösliner See, Hohendorfer See, Krumminer Wiek and Achterwasser.

The bodden are important sanctuaries for many species of birds and are especially important resting places for migratory birds like cranes and geese. This was the reason for the establishment of the Western Pomerania Lagoon Area National Park (Nationalpark Vorpommersche Boddenlandschaft), comprising most of the bodden between Darß and Rügen.

Traditionally bodden have been good fishing areas, rich in Mesolithic community sites, in particular the Pomeranian bodden of Rügen, Greifswald and Peenestrom. From these waters anglers regularly land 10–15 kg pike.

== Bibliography ==
- Harvesting the Sea, Farming the Forest by Marek Zvelebil, Lucyna Domańska, Robin Dennell
