= Kleiner Werder =

German island in the Baltic Sea

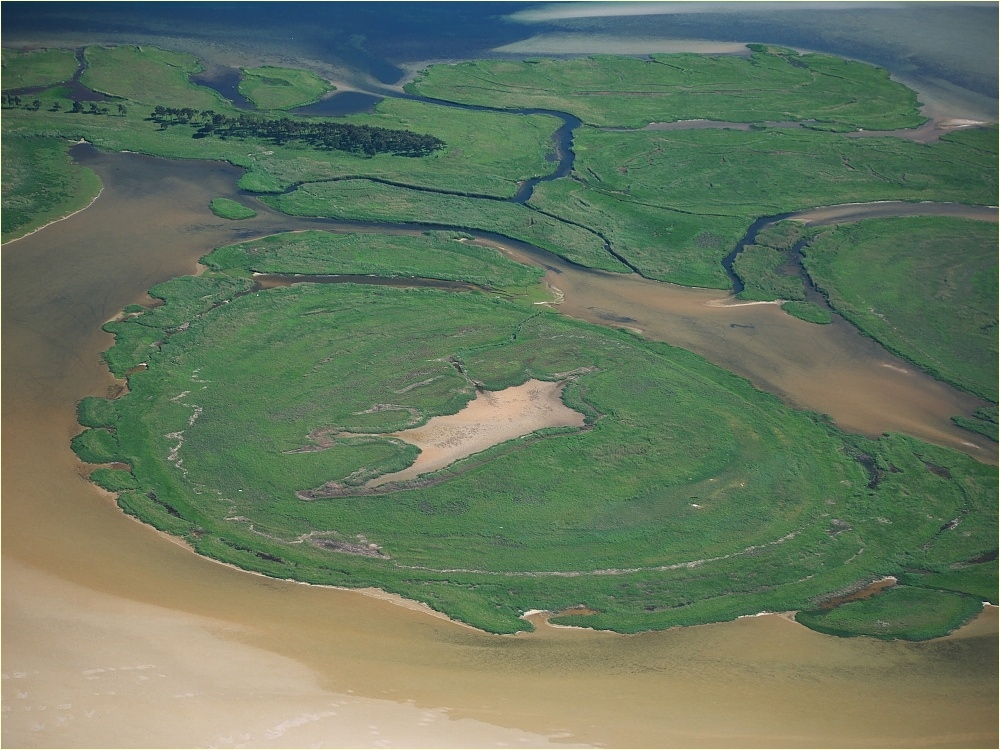
- Kleiner Werder: island (group) in the Western Pomerania Lagoon Area National Park

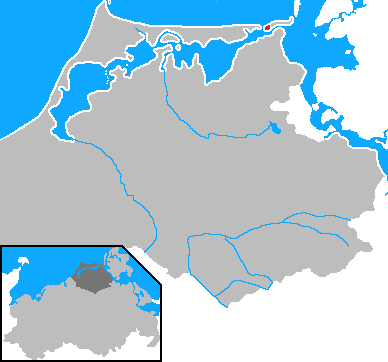
- Location of the island group of Kleiner Werder

Geography
- Location: Baltic Sea
- Coordinates: 54.43694°N 12.9775°E

Administration
- Germany
- State: Mecklenburg-Western Pomerania

Demographics
- Population: 0

Kleiner Werder is the name of an island and its associated group (aka the Kleine Werder) of uninhabited and not clearly geographically separable German islands in the Baltic Sea that belong to the state of Mecklenburg-Western Pomerania.

The individual island elements are only separated from one another by shallow water channels that occasionally dry out. Their highest points lie no more than one metre above sea level. The Kleiner Werder lies off the mainland east of the peninsula of Großer Werder and west of the likewise uninhabited island of Bock. It is only separated from Bock by narrow, shallow waterways. All the aforementioned islands and peninsulas have been formed in the last 150 years or so by the deposition of sediments that had been carried away from elsewhere on the coast, especially from Darßer Ort and dumped by current further to the east. Numerous birds breed on these treeless islands; as a result they are protected as part of conservation zone I in the Western Pomerania Lagoon Area National Park and may only be visited with special permission.
