= Bock (island) =

Island in Germany

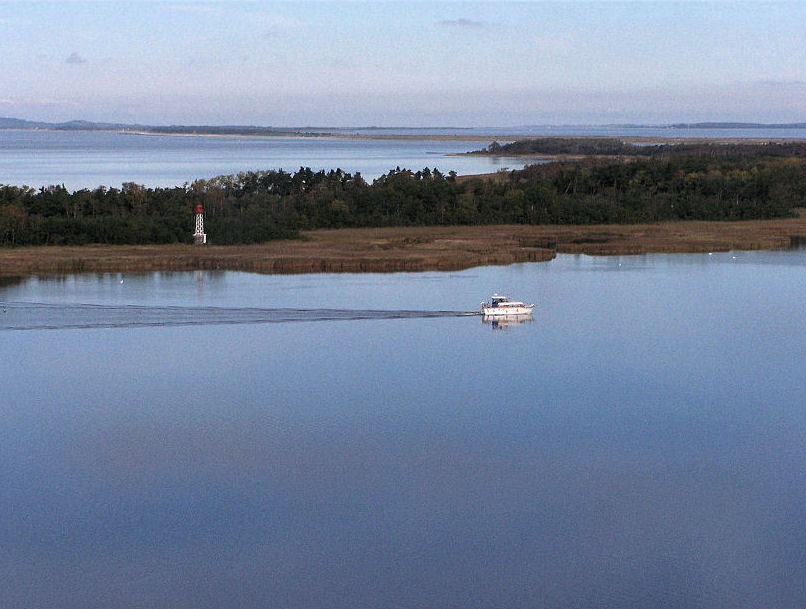
- View from Barhöft over Bock and Gellen to Hiddensee

Geography
- Location: Baltic Sea
- Coordinates: 54.451028°N 13.048694°E

Administration
- Germany

Demographics
- Population: 0

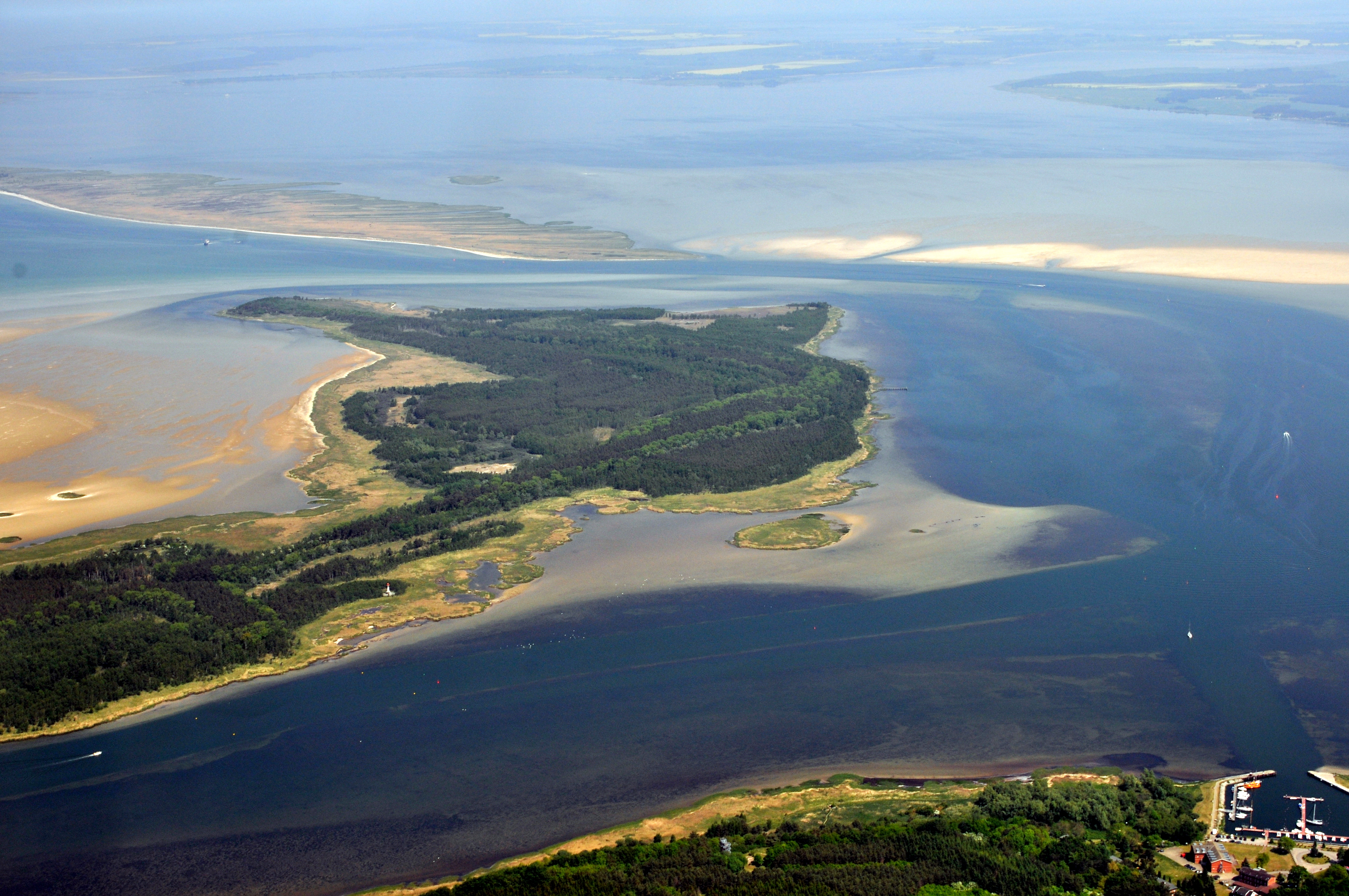
Aerial photograph of the island of Bock

Bock (German pronunciation: [bɔk]) is an island in the Baltic Sea southwest of the island of Hiddensee and east of the peninsula of Zingst. It belongs to the municipality of Groß Mohrdorf in the northeast German state of Mecklenburg-Vorpommern.

The island of Bock was artificially created by the dumping of sand from the channel to Stralsund (the Gellenstrom) and lies within the core zone of the West Pomeranian Lagoon Area National Park. It is a nature reserve and is uninhabited. Its name is derived from the word aufgebockt ("propped up"). The name arose because many ships ran aground on the former sandbank and thus became "propped up" in a sense. In the west the island is only separated from the Kleine Werder island group by narrow, shallow watercourses.

Just off the island to the north is one of the few windwatts on the German Baltic Sea coast. In favourable wind conditions and the resulting low water levels the mudflat or watt is exposed.
