= Prerower Strom =

Coordinates: 54°26′3.5124″N 12°37′15.81″E

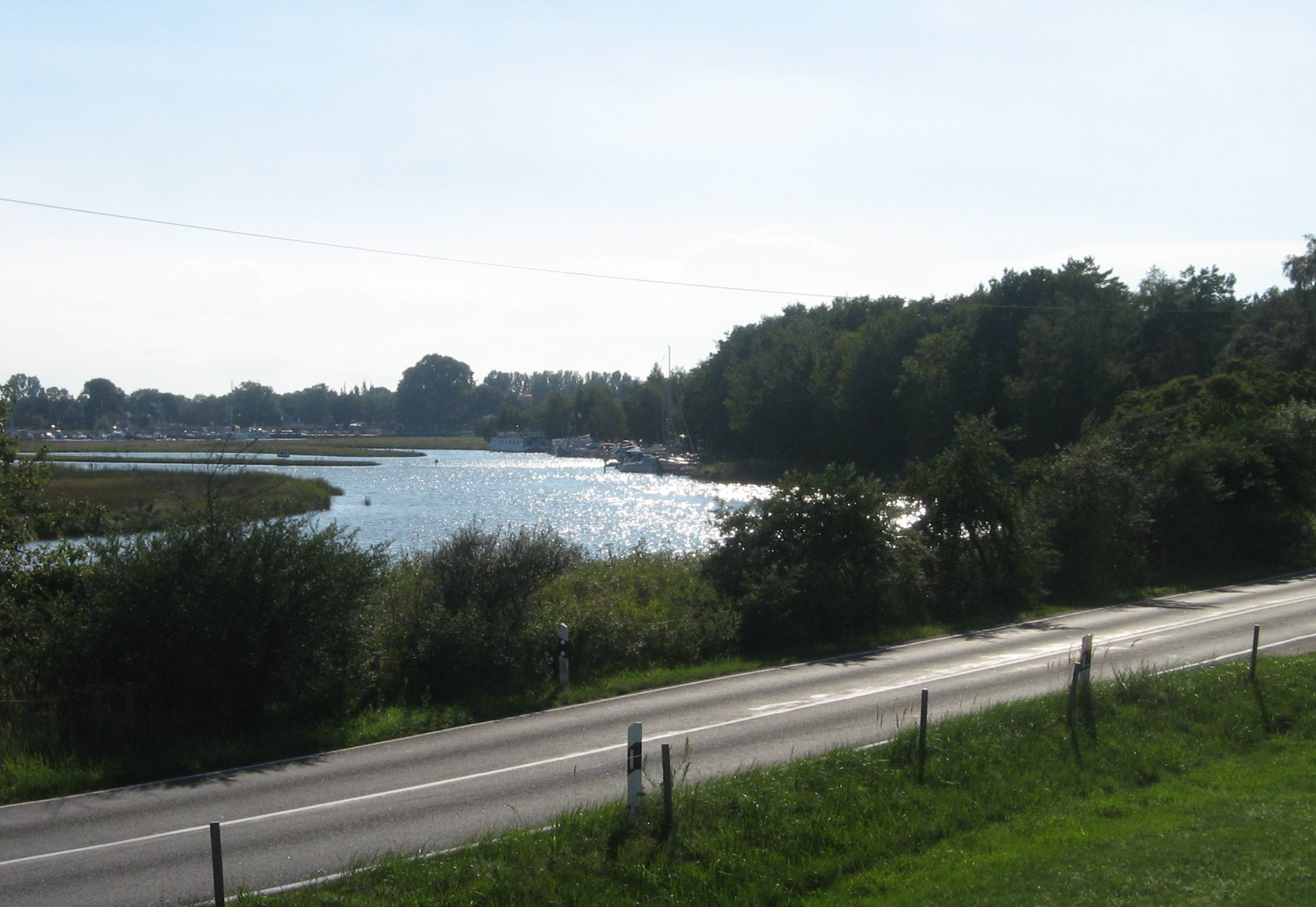
The Prerower Strom with Prerow harbour in the background

The Prerower Strom, Prerow Strom or Prerowstrom is an arm of the Baltic Sea in northeast Germany. It begins near the island of Schmidtbülten in the Bodstedter Bodden and winds its way through the countryside of the peninsula of Fischland-Darß-Zingst, where it separates Darß from the peninsula of Zingst. It ends at the harbour of the village of Prerow that gives it its name. The Prerower Strom is part of the Western Pomerania Lagoon Area National Park.

== History ==
The Prerower Strom is not a river, but a so-called "gat" (Seegatt) or inlet, and was not formed until the first millennium A.D. when the Zingst began to be exposed as sea levels fell. As a rule the waters of the Prerower Strom flowed towards inland, which is how the Schmidtbülten were formed as part of a regressive delta. Until the 19th century the Prerower Strom linked the bodden with the open sea and was up to 10.35 kilometres long. In 1872, however, there was serious flooding in the area, during which the northern part of the inlet, near Prerow, silted up and, as a result, was filled in and protected by dykes in 1874.

== Today ==
The Prerower Strom, which has long since ceased to carry any flowing water, was divided into four parts, all separated by road embankments and linked by small canals and leats. These stretches of water are on average up to 3 metres deep.

The longest section is 7.13 kilometres long and runs from the bodden to the Landesstraße 21 (L 21) state road, the so-called "Spas Road" (Bäderstraße) in Prerow. West of the road, in Prerow, lie three smaller Strom lakes (Strom-Seen), which are each 500 to 700 metres long.

== Boat services and leisure activities ==
There are boat services on the main arm of the Prerower Strom from Prerow to several villages on the peninsula of Fischland-Darß-Zingst and the nearby mainland. These comprise both ferry and passenger vessel services.

On the centre of the western lakes, accessible from the road that runs to the pier on the Baltic Sea, fishing and pedal-boats are also permitted. On the southwestern corner of this lake, on Ladenstraße near the boat hire place, there are several confectionery stalls, a pirate ship ride and a merry-go-round. This corner is known by locals as the Volksfest or "folk festival". Further north, towards the pier, where there are driving restrictions on the Ladenstraße, there are about 20 souvenir and speciality shops that make it the busiest shopping road on the peninsula.

== Gallery ==
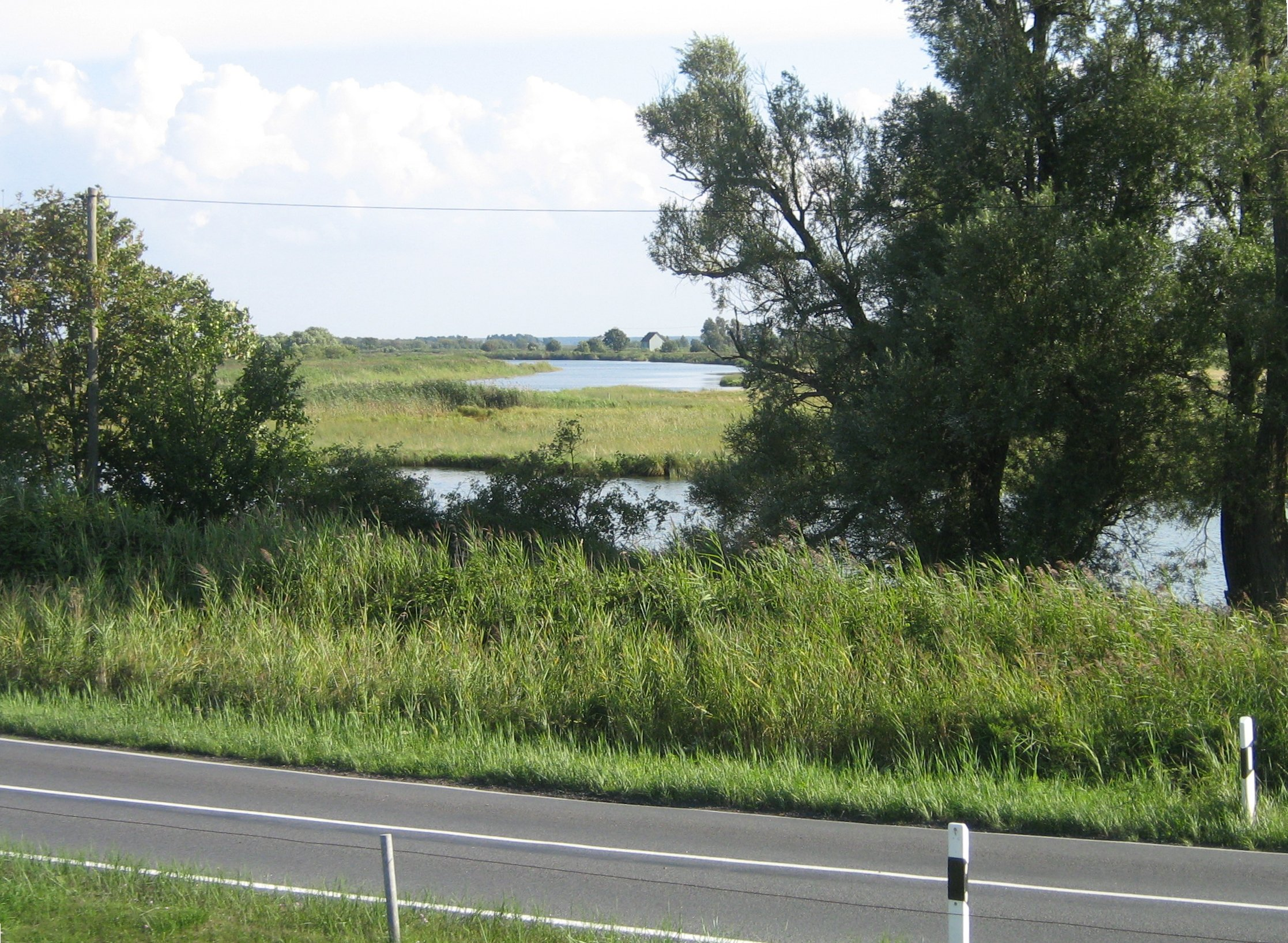
The Prerower Strom between Zingst and Darß

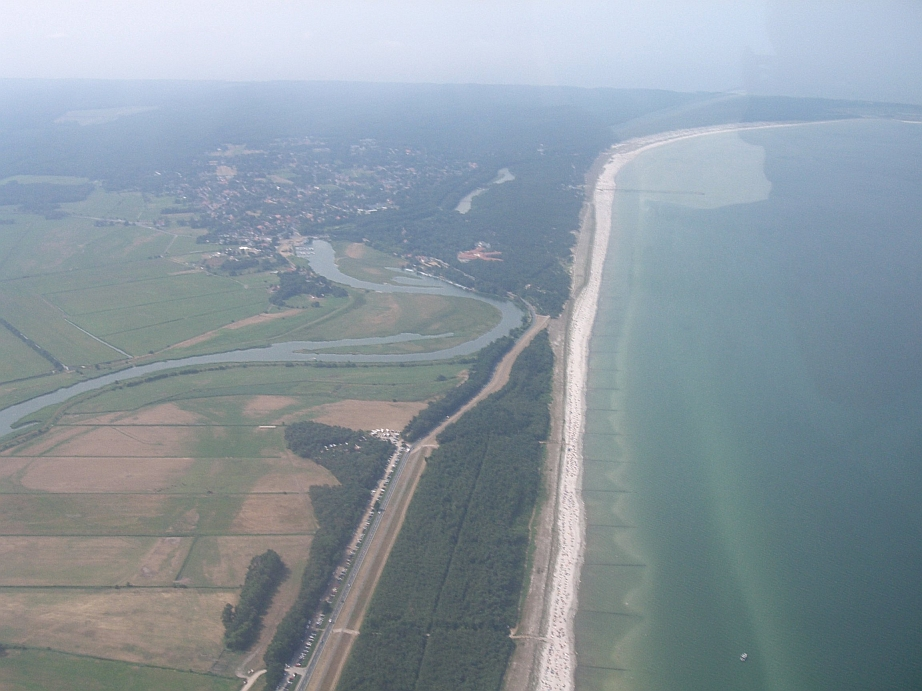
Aerial photo of the Prerower Strom with Prerow, the harbour, Strom lakes, L 21 road and pier

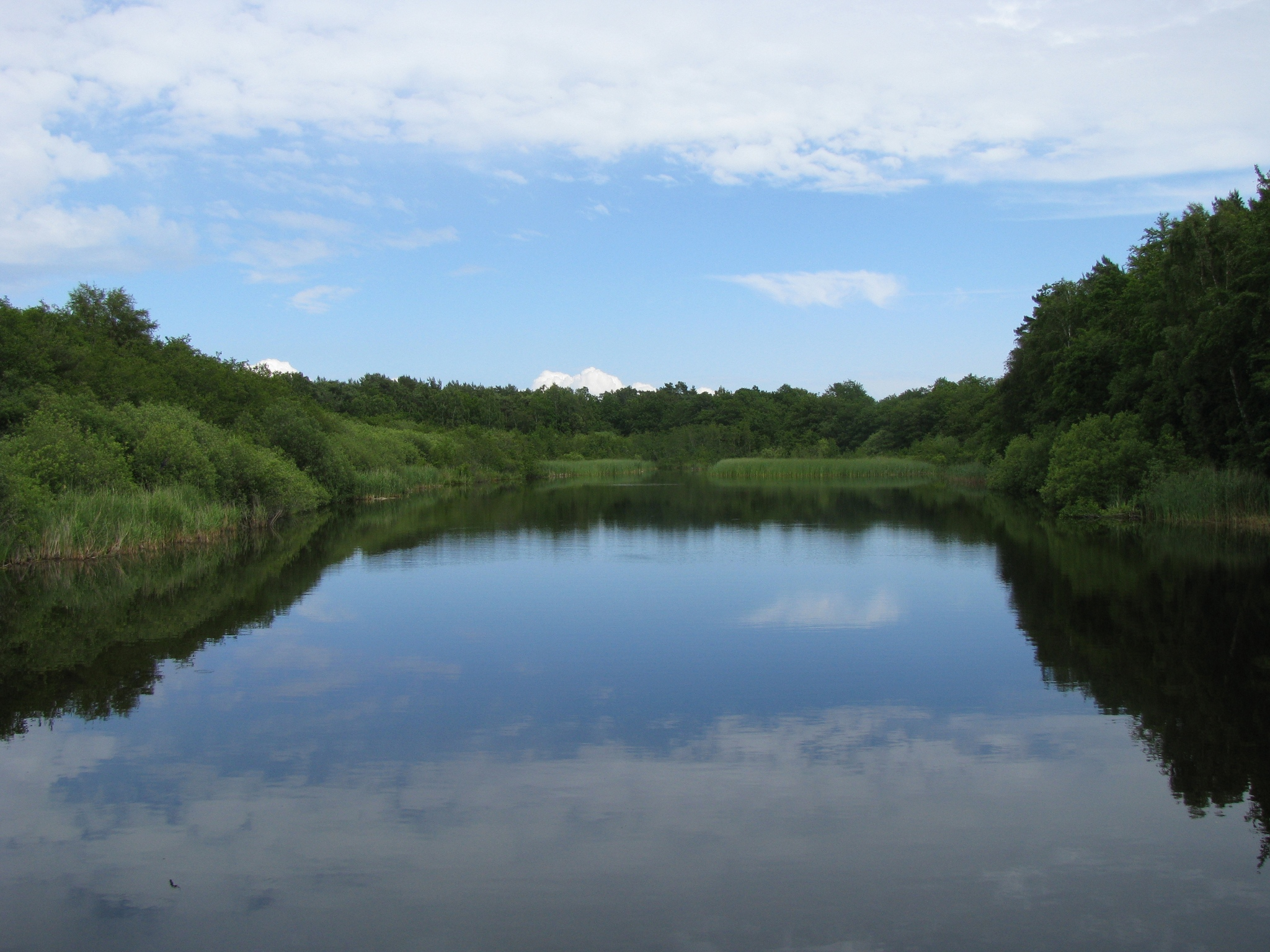
One of the northern Strom lakes
