= Barthe (river) =

River in Germany

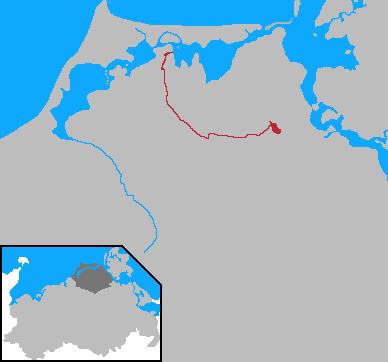
- Location of Barthe in Mecklenburg-Vorpommern

Location
- Country: Germany
- State: Mecklenburg-Vorpommern

Physical characteristics
- Mouth
  - location: Barther Bodden
  - coordinates: 54.3683°N 12.6880°E

Barthe is a river of Mecklenburg-Vorpommern, Germany. The river has a length of about 35 kilometers. It discharges into the Barther Bodden, which is connected to the Baltic Sea.

== See also ==
- List of rivers of Mecklenburg-Vorpommern
