= Regressive delta =

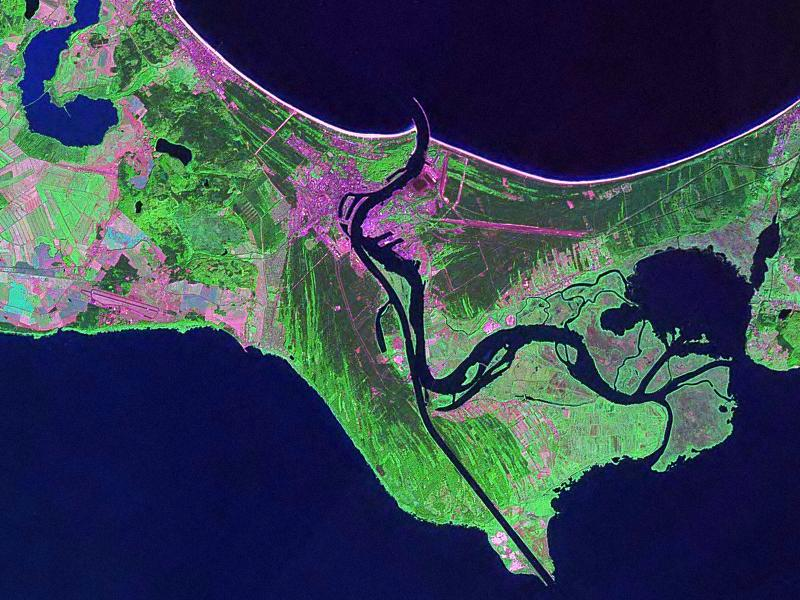

The Świna and its regressive delta

A regressive delta is a body of sediment that forms at the landward end of a gut.

In contrast to river deltas, regressive deltas are not caused by fluvial sedimentation but by marine sedimentation. During storm events, sediment-bearing sea water is pressed through the gut into the adjacent lagoon. Sedimentation takes place immediately after the water has passed the gut because the velocity of the current strongly decreases. The surplus water will leave the lagoon at leeward guts.

Well-known regressive deltas on the Baltic Sea coast are those of the Prerower Strom in northeast Germany and the Świna in northwest Poland.
