= Zingst =

Peninsula in Germany

Coordinates: 54°25′N 12°40′E

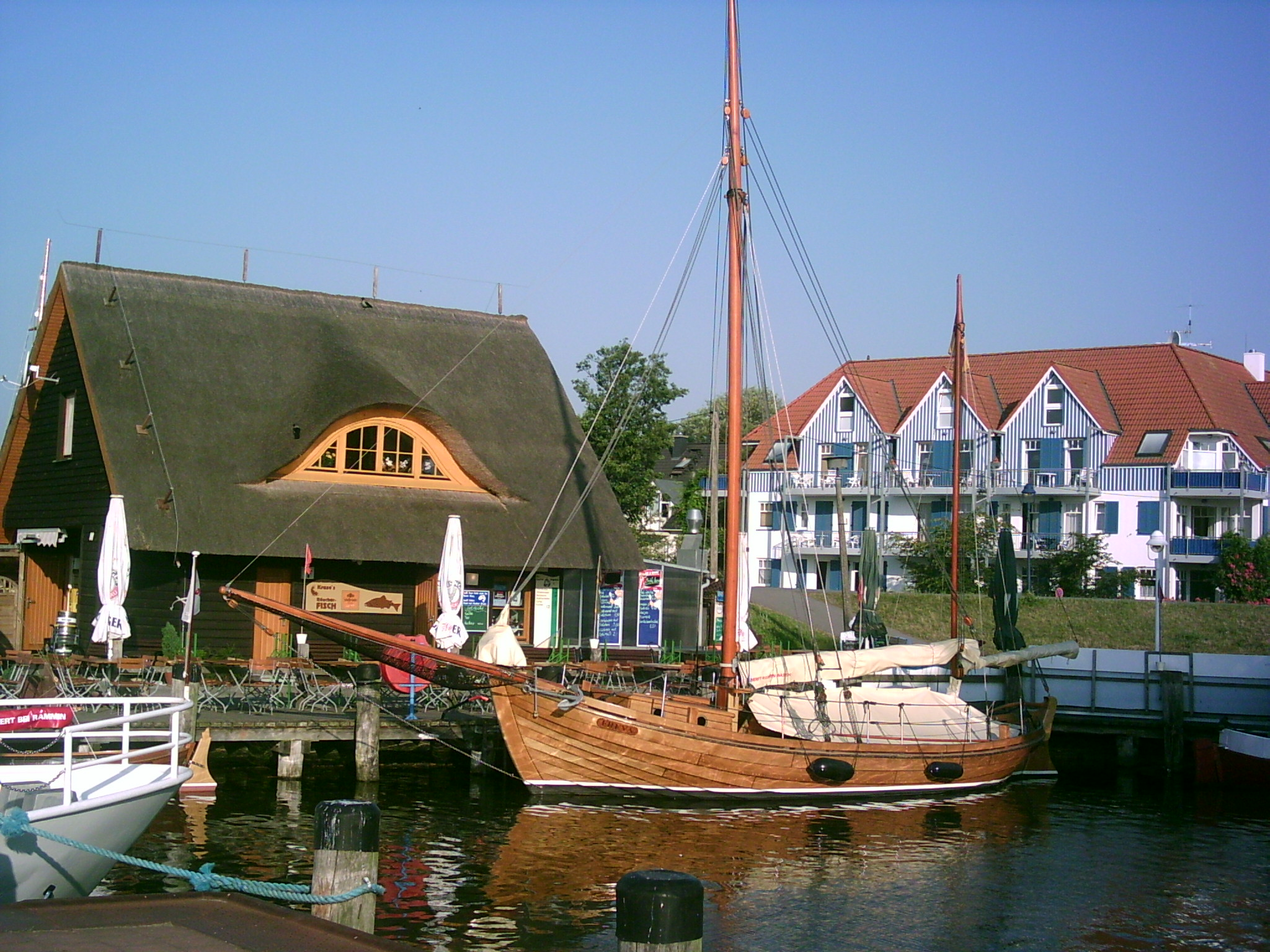
The harbour of Zingst

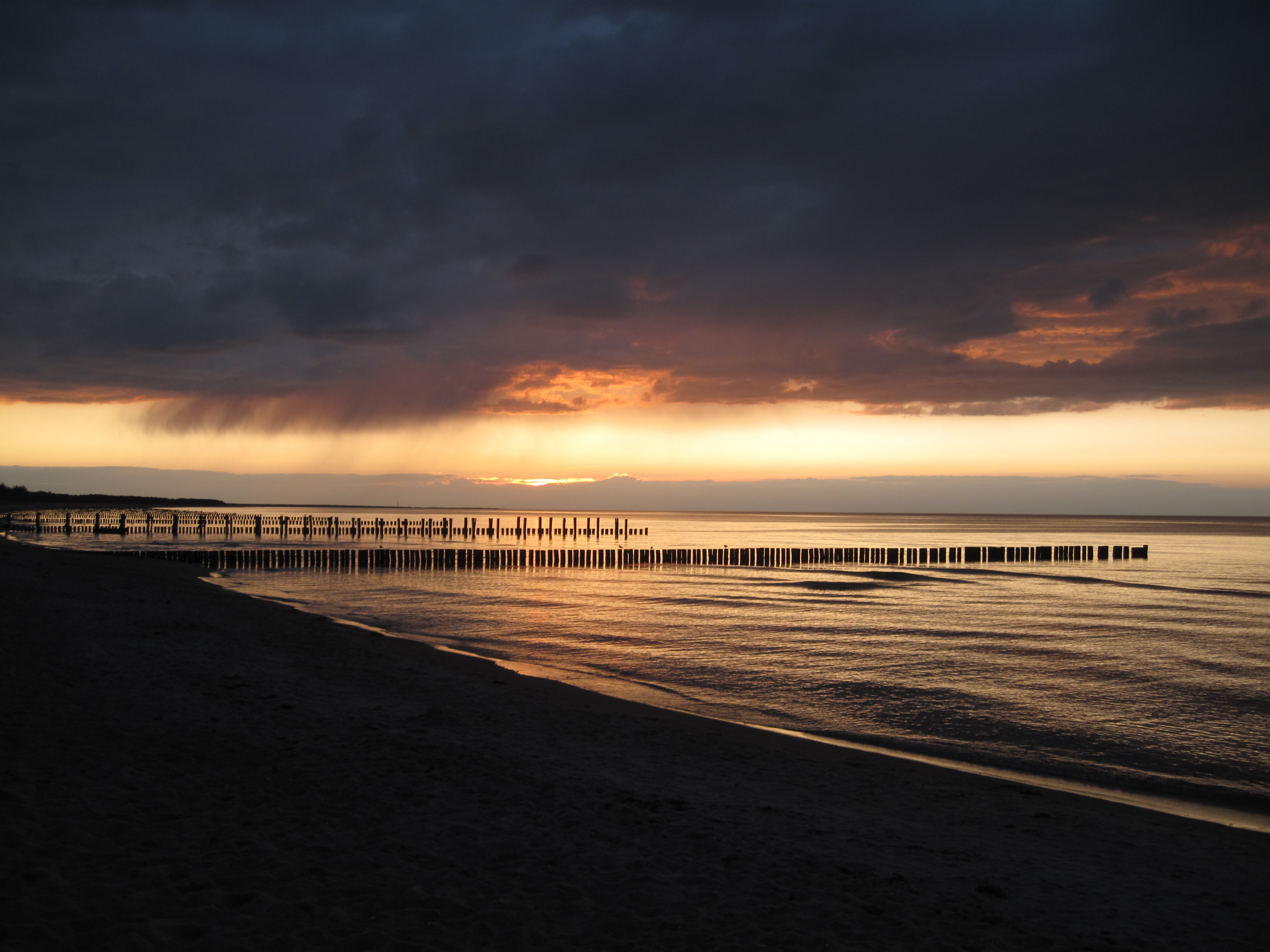
Baltic Sea beach of Zingst

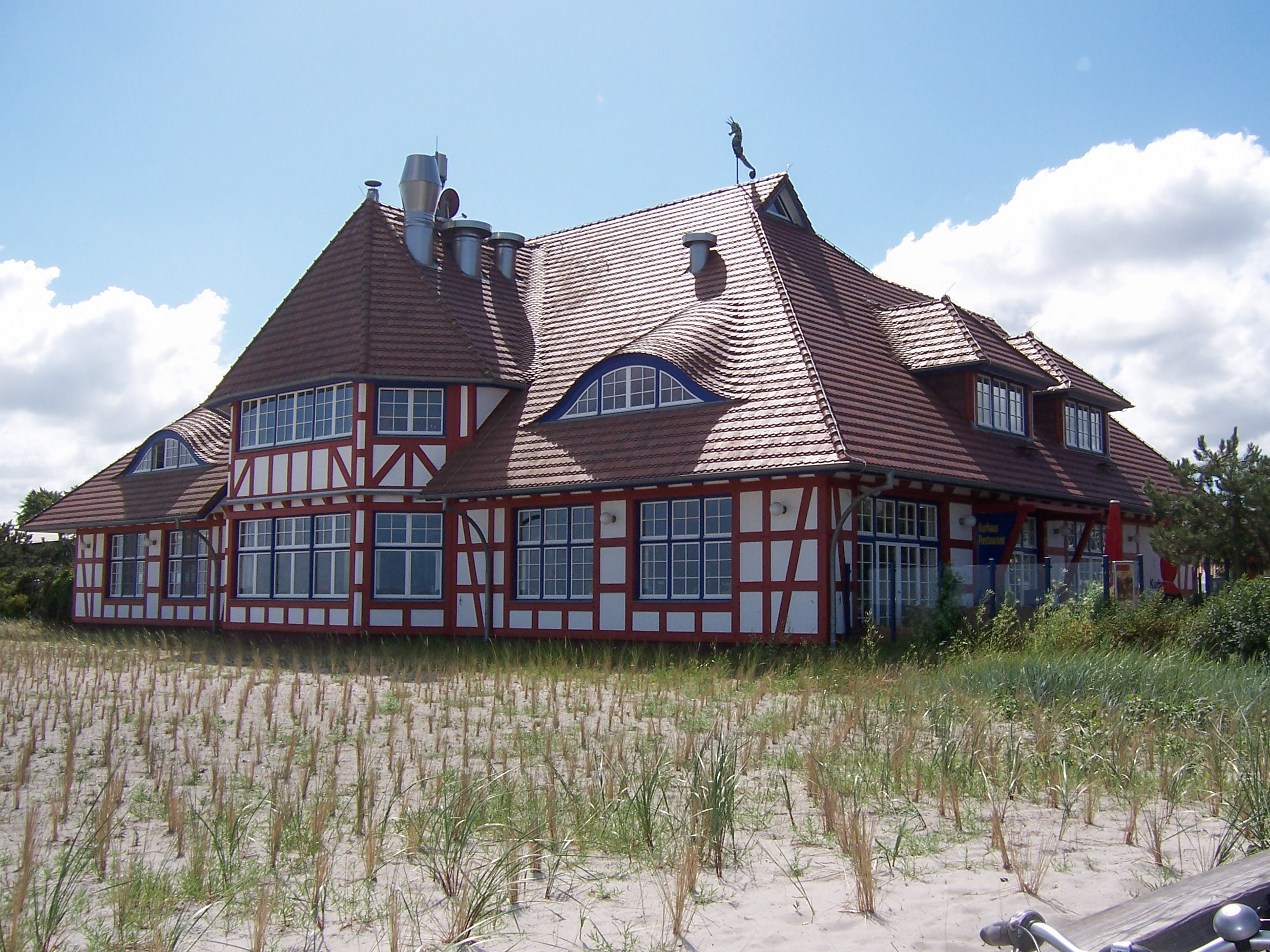
Kurhaus Zingst (spa hotel at the beach)

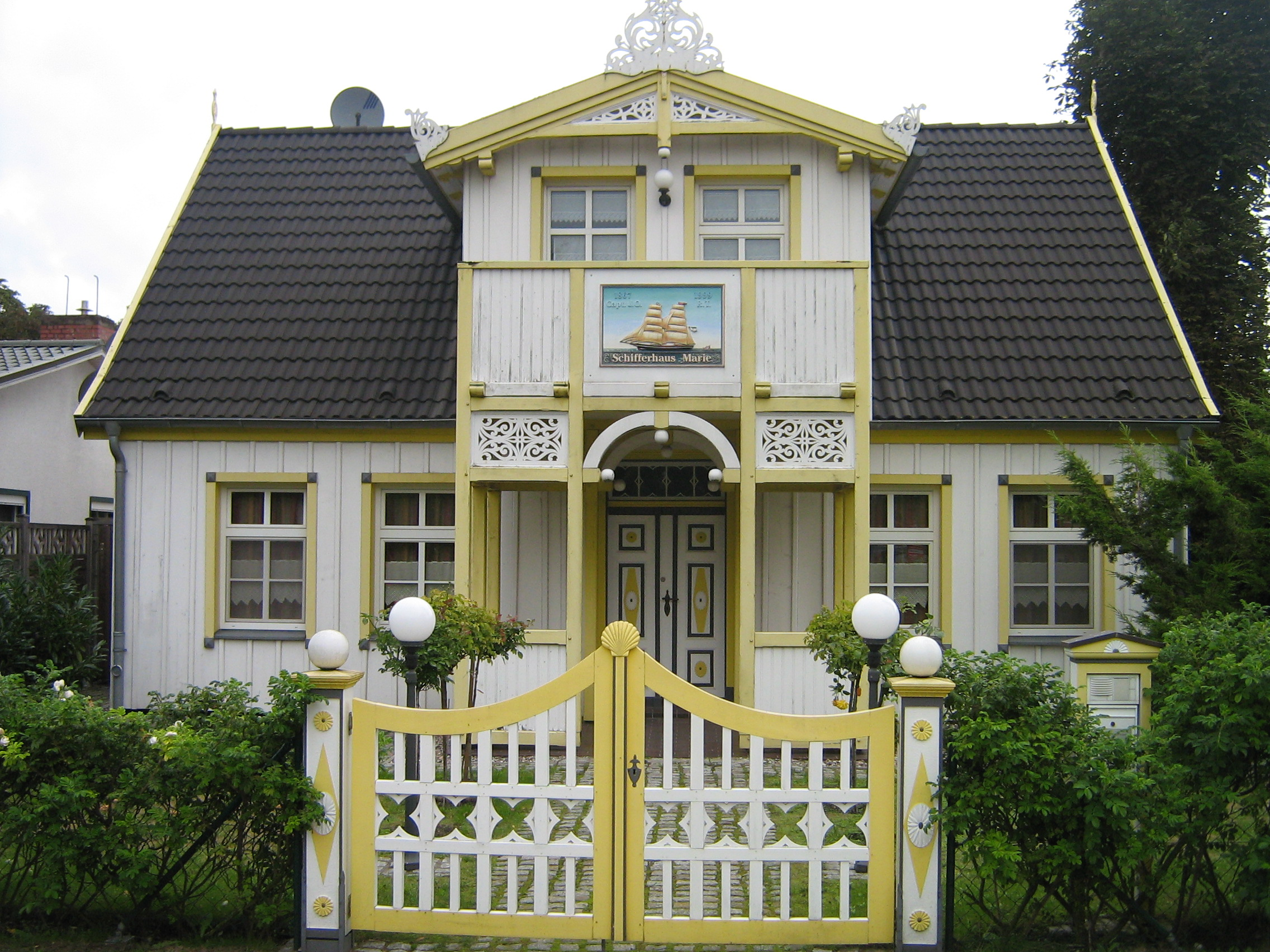
Typical Zingst captain's house

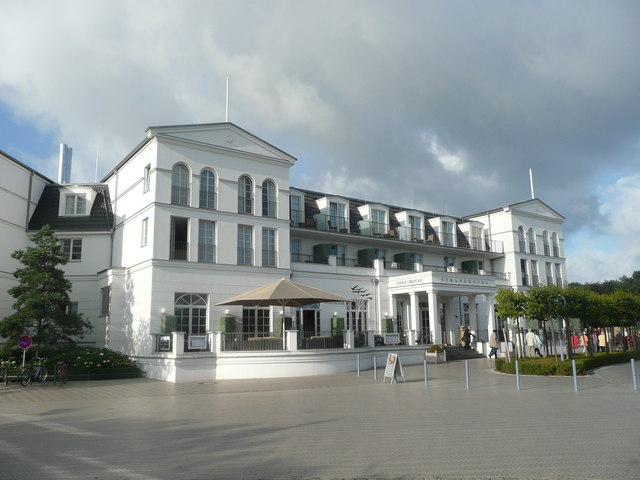
Steigenberger Grand Hotel Zingst

Zingst (German pronunciation: [ˈtsɪŋst]; Polabian Sgoni) is the easternmost portion of the three-part Fischland-Darß-Zingst Peninsula, located in Mecklenburg-Vorpommern, Germany, between the cities of Rostock and Stralsund on the southern shore of the Baltic Sea.

The area is part of the Pomeranian coast. The Zingst Peninsula forms an eastward-running spit, nearly 20 km (12 mi) in length, and has a width of just 2 to 4 km (1.2 to 2.5 mi).

Zingst separates the Baltic Sea from the lagoon of Barther Bodden, which is part of the Darss-Zingst Bodden Chain, a large estuary. The shallow waters of the inlet are a major stopover for the migratory European crane. In spring and autumn, up to 3,000 birds gather here on their migration route to and from Spain. Most of the estuary and the eastern end of the peninsula are part of the Western Pomerania Lagoon Area National Park.

Until the early 1870s, Zingst was an island, separated from Darß by the Prerowstrom, a narrow inlet. A storm tide in 1874 closed the inlet, which had connected the bodden with the Baltic Sea. A road now connects Zingst and Darß, running along a 100 m (330 ft)-wide isthmus.

The soils of Zingst consist almost entirely of sand. The sand is white in colour, which makes it popular with sunbathers and tourists. Dunes border the Baltic Sea and enclose low ground about half a metre below sea level. The low-lying land results in boggy conditions in the interior of the peninsula, and these bogs offer habitat to a wide variety of wildlife. The ruins of a Slavic fort, the 'Hertesburg,' are on the Zingst peninsula near Zingst municipality.

== Geology, climate and natural region ==
The peninsula of Zingst or the Zingst is the easternmost part of the Fischland-Darß-Zingst peninsula that lies between the city of Rostock and town of Stralsund on the southern Baltic Sea coast. With a length of just under 20 km and a width of 2 to 4 km (1.2 to 2.5 mi) the Zingst stretches eastwards from the adjacent peninsula of Darß. It is bounded to the north by the Baltic and to the south by the lagoons of Barther Bodden und Grabow, that belong to the Darss-Zingst Bodden Chain. The island of Großer Werder, once lay off the eastern coast of Zingst, and now forms a peninsula as a result of sanding up.

The land bridge to Darß to the west is only about 100 m (330 ft) wide and right on the Baltic Sea. At this spot in 1874 the inlet of Prerower Strom, which had hitherto lined the lagoon and the Baltic, was artificially closed following the 1872 Baltic Sea flood. Only since that time has Zingst no longer been an island.

The settlement heart of the village of Zingst lies between the Freesenbruch in the west, the Baltic in the north, the Alte Straminke, an old sea inlet with its surrounding marshes, in the east, and the channel of Zingster Strom in the south. The village is barely above sea level, so that it has to be protected from storm floods by dykes. Further east, on the Zingster Strom, is the village of Müggenburg.

East of the village of Zingst lies a large forest, very rich in wildlife, called the Osterwald. Beyond that are the Sund Meadows (Sundischen Wiesen) named after Stralsund. The easternmost point of the peninsula is Pramort.

=== Geology ===
The original island of Zingst is, geologically, a very young landscape. Its formation process began with the end of Weichselian glaciation, about 12,000 years ago. This left behind a Young Drift landscape. As a result of the melting ice sheet, the underlying land lifted and the hollows were filled with water and the predecessor to the Baltic Sea, Lake Ancylus, was created. The tops of the ridges remained exposed as islands. The major outline of the coasts in the southern area of the Baltic Sea were formed by the Littorina transgression, about 7,000 to 2,500 years ago. About 5,000 years ago, the sea reached its present level and the cores of today's Darß and Zingst became islands. 4,500 years ago, the salt water inflow from the North Sea reduced greatly and, since then, the Baltic Sea has slowly become less salty. Coastal erosion (abrasion, dispersal and deposition) has extended the original islands in the course of time to their present form. About 1,500 years ago, the ever-lengthening spits cut off the bays lying behind them, forming a string of lagoons known as the Darss-Zingst Bodden Chain. Finally, in 1874, the Prerower Strom channel between the Darß and Zingst was artificially closed. Towards the end of the 20th century the former island of Great Werder became connected to the Zingst as the strait between them silted up. This area is a windwatt. The process of land formation continues at the eastern end of the peninsula today. Zingst lies between the accretion zones of Darßer Ort and Bock. Sediment is transported in a west-to-east direction, and the beach at Zingst loses 40 cm annually. The loss was mainly caused by storm surges, so this process is now severely weakened.

=== Climate ===
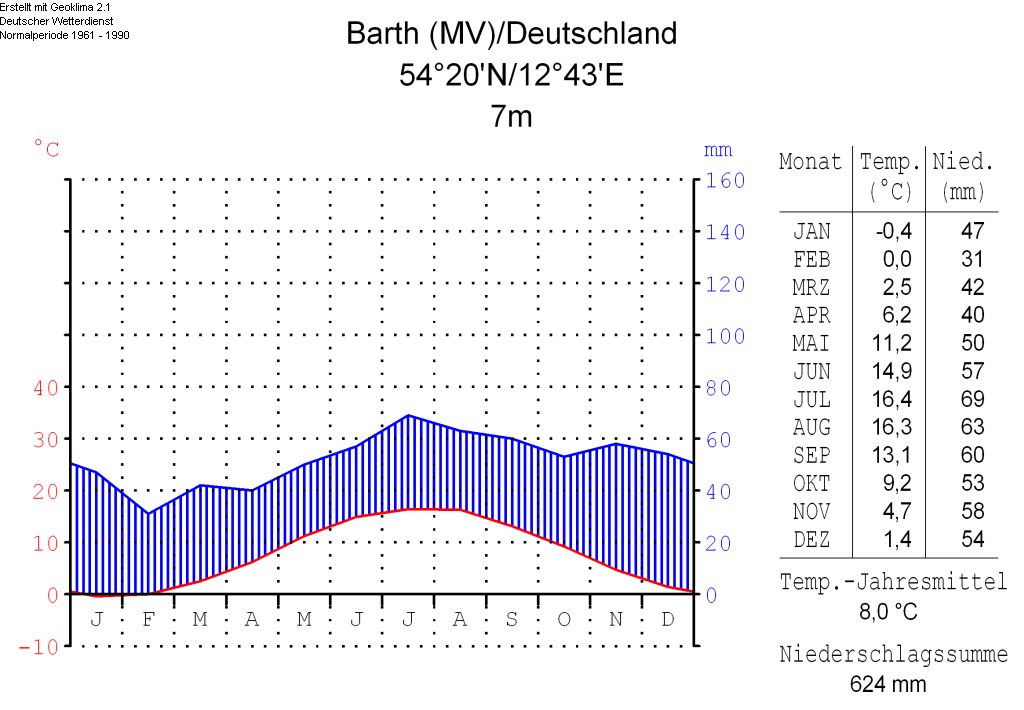
Climatic diagram for Barth

Zingst exhibits a North Mecklenburg coastal climate. The annual average temperature is 7.8 °C (46.0 °F). The number of frosty days is 11.1 and the number of hot summer days (temperatures over 25 °C (77 °F)) is 7.9. Precipitation is a relatively low 600 millimetres (24 in) per year. The average humidity is very high as a result of its coastal location. As a result the number of dull days is 146.

=== Flora and fauna ===
The Osterwald forest is the only raised bog in Mecklenburg-Western Pomerania, but it has been partially dried out as a result of human intervention. The tree species here include birch, English oak, beech and pine. Other trees introduced by humans include alder, spruce and firs. A feature is the redwoods, planted in 1955. Amongst the animal population are tawny owl, red kite and short-eared owl. Pine martens are also common.

== Settlement ==
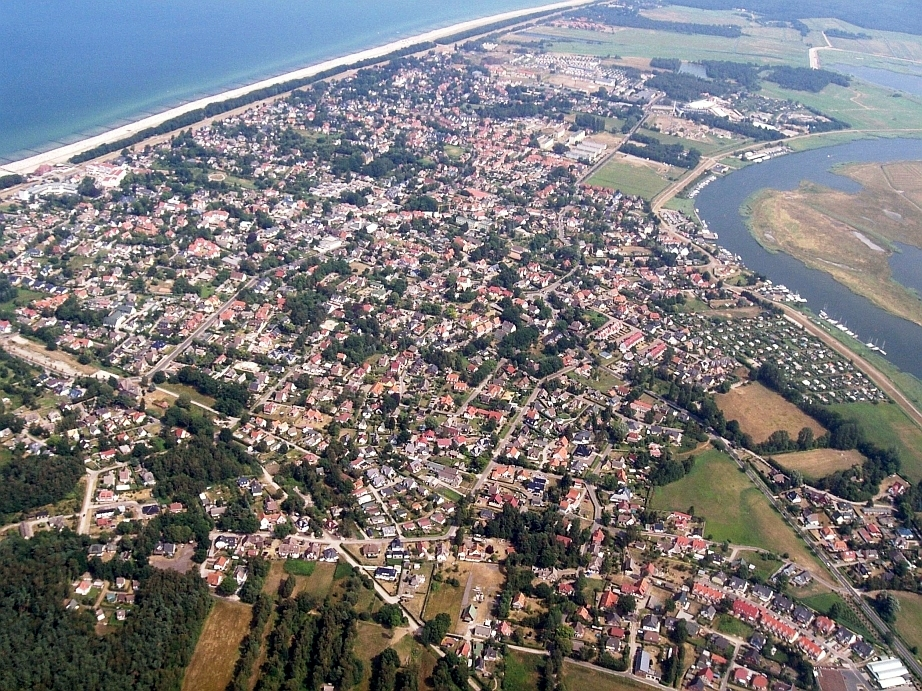
Zingst aerial view

East of the Prerowstrom, surrounded by countryside and the Freesenbruch, is the town of Barth (population 8,000), which was created by the unification of the settlements of Pahlen, Hanshagen and Rothem ho. Hanshagen and Pahlen date to the 13th century.

The nearby town of Zingst has a population of about 3,200.

== Notable people ==
- Bernhard Tessmann (1912–1998), expert in guided missiles during WWII, later worked for NASA.
- Werner Kuhn (born 1955), politician; Member of the European Parliament (MEP), 2009/2019.

== Rocket experiments ==
At the former National People's Army training area in the Sundisch meadows from 1970-1992 various experiments were conducted using high-altitude research rockets.

In the early 1970s, five Polish Meteor 1E sounding rockets were launched from here. From 21 October 1988, Soviet MMR06-M rockets were launched. Even after the Wende, trials continued. Between 14 February 1992 and 10 April 1992, 19 Russian MMR06-M rockets were fired from Zingst. Although further rockets were available, the launch of MMR06-M rockets on Zingst had to be stopped in April 1992 because the army needed to clear the site to make the out of bounds area safe.
