= Gellenstrom =

Coordinates: 54°27′59.566″N 13°3′31.36″E

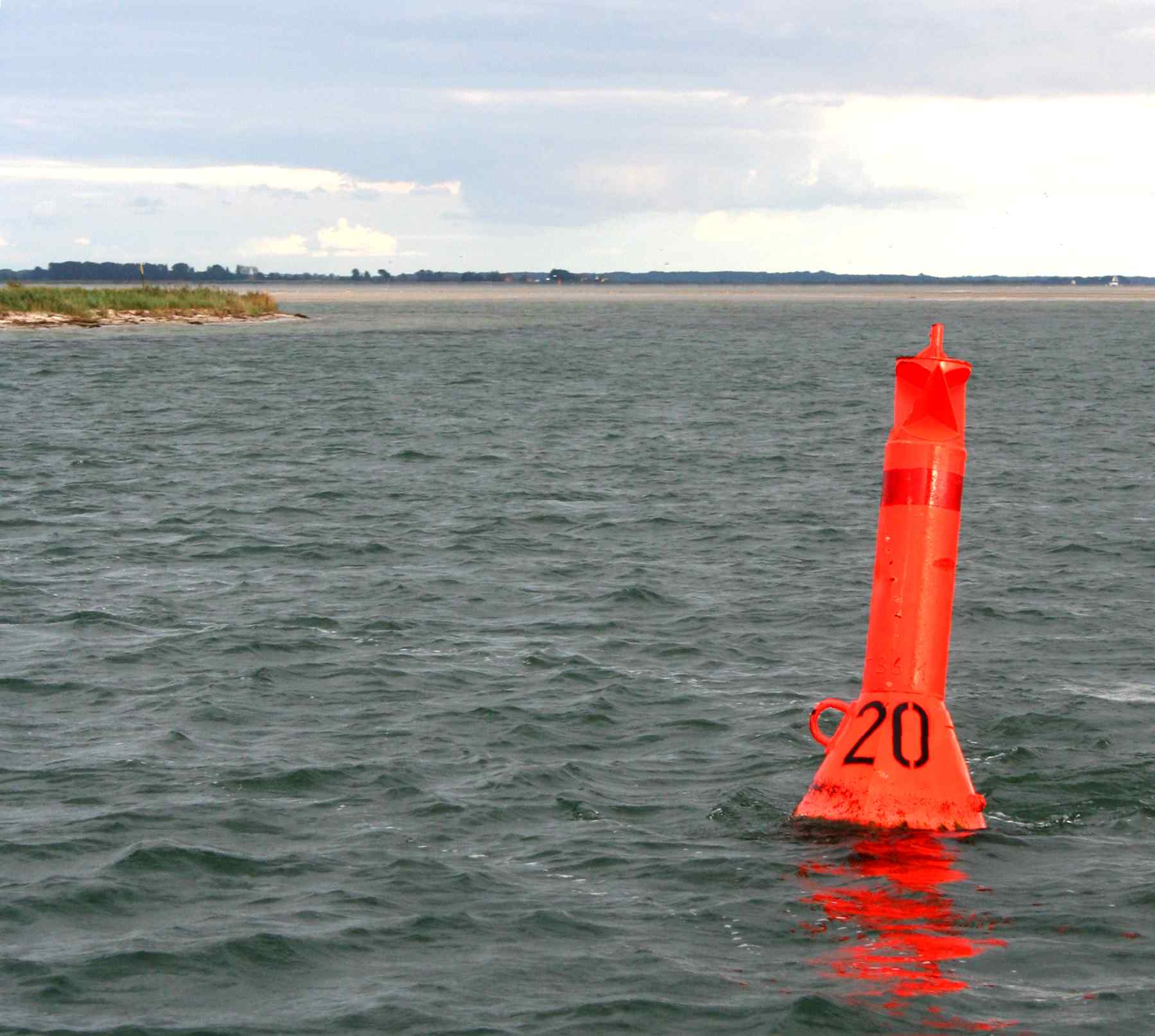
Buoy no. 20 in the Gellenstrom and the southern tip of the Gellen peninsula

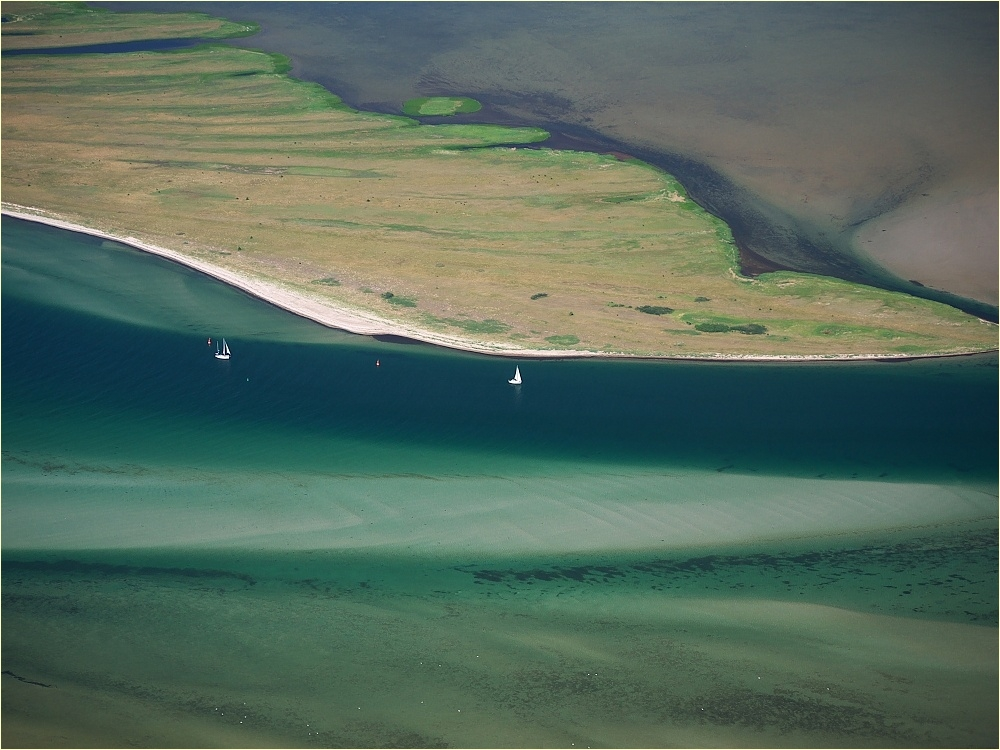
The Gellenstrom, a shipping channel south of the peninsula of Gellen which lies in the south of the island of Hiddensee

The Gellenstrom is a shipping channel in the Baltic Sea and forms the northwestern access to the ports of Stralsund and Strelasund. It is located in the Baltic Sea west of the peninsula of Gellen which gives it its name and which forms part of the island of Hiddensee. In addition, it is the main route from the Darss-Zingst Bodden Chain to the Baltic.

The Gellenstrom has a guaranteed depth of 3.70 metres and is controlled by the Gellen light which marks its northern approach. The maximum speed limit is 10 kn. To the south is the port of Barhöft, which is also accessible from the Gellenstrom via the Barhöft Creek (Barhöft -Rinne). To the west is the island of Bock, which was formed from sand dredged from the channel.
