= Zingster Strom =

Arm of the Barther Bodden lagoon

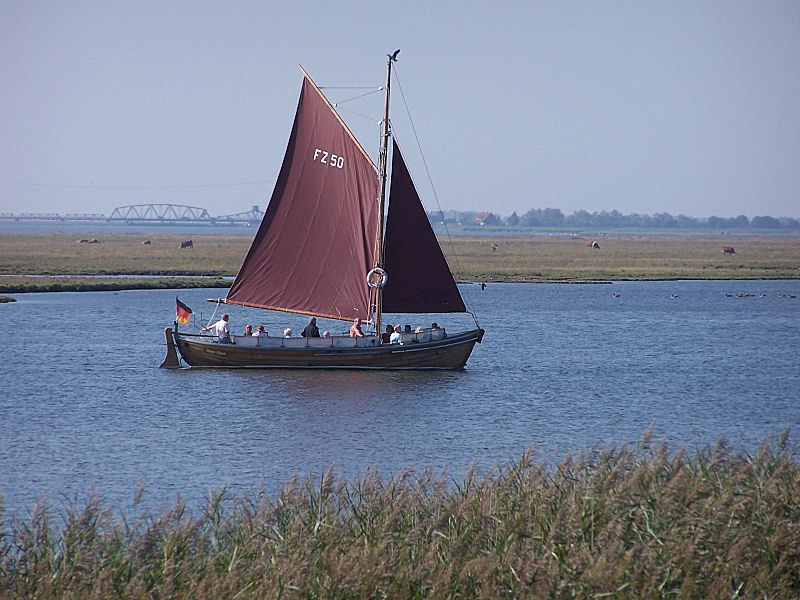
A Zeese trawler on the Zingster Strom. Behind: the island of Kirr

The Zingster Strom is a distinctive, river-like arm of the Barther Bodden lagoon, south of the Zingst peninsula on Germany's Baltic Sea coast. It lies between the island of Kirr and the Zingst and runs from east to west in a semi-circular arc, both ends being open to the south. It is less than one hundred metres wide in places and about three kilometres long. Unlike its rather shallow neighbouring waterbodies it is over six metres deep in places. At its northernmost point lies the village of Zingst with its harbour and a water fowl roosting area. Two smaller islands, Brunstwerder and Gänsebrink, are located in the Strom. The Strom used to have direct access to the Baltic via the Alte Stramminke, a former inlet.

54°25′38″N 12°42′55″E
