= Barther Bodden =

Lagoon in Germany

Coordinates: 54°23′41″N 12°44′44″E

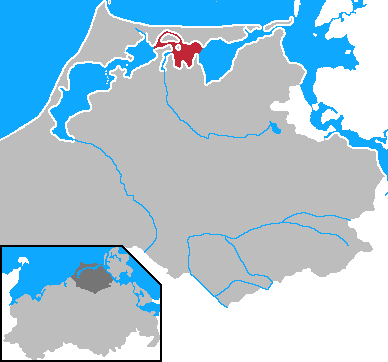
The location of the Barther Bodden

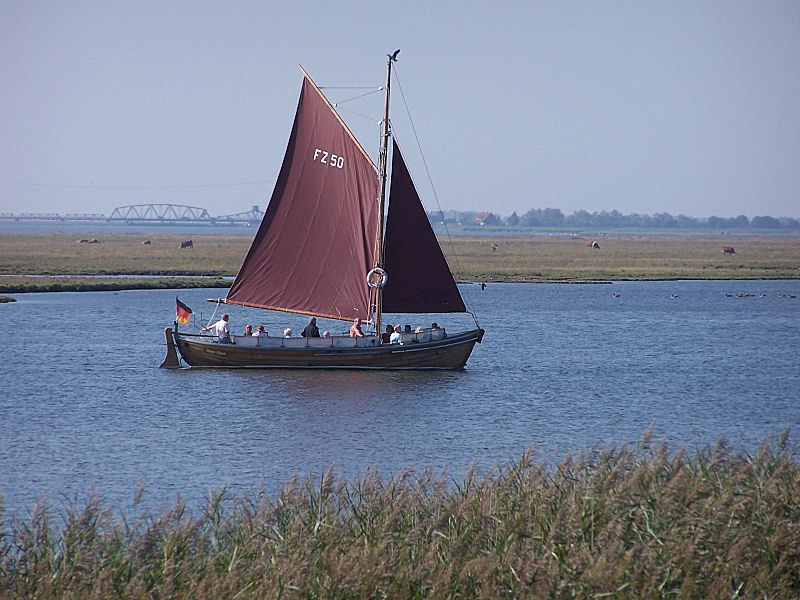
A zeesenboot on the Großen Kirr

The Barther Bodden (German for Barth Lagoon) is a bodden water between the Zingst peninsula and the mainland town of Barth. It is a brackish lagoon that is part of the Darss-Zingst Bodden Chain. Its largest inflow is the Barthe stream.

Large parts of the Barther Bodden have a depth of less than 2 meters, so that shipping is very restricted. Today, it is limited almost exclusively to sport boats and pleasure cruisers. To the north is the Zingster Strom, the river-like section of the bodden south of Zingst. Here the bodden reaches its greatest depths of over six metres.

To the northwest lie the well-known islands of Kirr and Barther Oie, both important breeding areas for gulls, terns, waterfowl and waders. These rise just a few centimetres above the water level of the bodden and are out of bounds to visitors. The Kirr is used as cattle pasture and, during the autumn migration is an important stopover for cranes.
