= Western Pomerania Lagoon Area National Park =

National park in Mecklenburg-Vorpommern, Germany

- Nationalpark Vorpommersche Boddenlandschaft
- IUCN category II (national park)
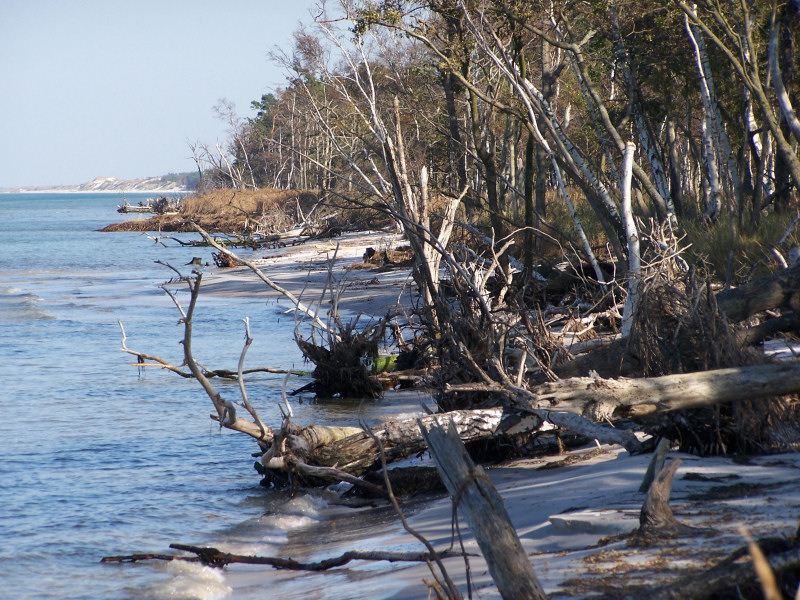
- Coastal vegetation

- Location within Germany
- Location: Mecklenburg-Vorpommern, Germany
- Nearest city: Rostock and Stralsund
- Coordinates: 54.436°N 12.909°E
- Area: 805 km^{2} (311 sq mi)
- Established: 1 October 1990

Western Pomerania Lagoon Area National Park (Nationalpark Vorpommersche Boddenlandschaft) is Mecklenburg-Vorpommern's largest national park, situated at the coast of the Baltic Sea. It consists of several peninsulas, islands and lagoon shore areas in the Baltic Sea, belonging to the district of Vorpommern-Rügen.

The national park includes:

- the Darß peninsula
- the western coast of the island of Rügen
- the island of Hiddensee
- the island of Ummanz
- several tiny islets between the above places
- the multiple lagoons in between the land masses

The national park is characterised by very shallow water housing a unique coastal fauna. All portions of the national park are famous for being a resting place for tens of thousands of cranes and geese.

Its area is 805 km^{2} (311 sq mi).

== Composition ==
Approximately half the area of the park is open Baltic Sea; more than another quarter covers parts of the lagoons in the Darss-Zingst Bodden Chain including the West Rügen Bodden. Thus it protects these shallow water areas (in the Baltic Sea, the National Park boundary is based on the ten-metre depth contour) with their rich flora and fauna. The differing salt content of the brackish water habitats of the Baltic and the bodden (shallow lagoons) contribute significantly to the local diversity of nature. For example, the Baltic Herring visits the shallow bays regularly to spawn here.

The territory of the national park includes parts of the Darß and the peninsula of Zingst as well as most of the island of Hiddensee. In addition, a narrow strip of land on the island of Rügen, next to the bodden lies within the national park. Pine and beech woods, such as the Darß Forest, cover much of the land. In treeless areas there are bogs, resulting from coastal flooding.

== See also ==
- Bug (Rügen)

== Sources ==
- "Nationalparkplan - Bestandsanalyse" (PDF). Landesamt für Forsten und Großschutzgebiete Mecklenburg-Vorpommern. 2002. p. 209. Archived from the original (PDF) on 11 February 2014.
- "Nationalparkplan - Leitbild und Ziele" (PDF). Landesamt für Forsten und Großschutzgebiete Mecklenburg-Vorpommern. 2002. p. 76. Archived from the original (PDF) on 14 December 2013.
- Frank Gnoth-Austen, Rudolf Specht: Jasmund, Vorpommersche Boddenlandschaft. Vehling, Werl 1995, ISBN 3-536-00476-8 (Deutsche Nationalparke, Vol. 2).
- Norbert Rosing, Sarah Fuchs, Klaus Nigge: Deutsche Nationalparks. Tecklenborg, Steinfurt 1997, ISBN 3-924044-29-5.
