= Rügen (district) =

Coordinates: 54°25′N 13°25′E

- District
- Flag Coat of arms

- Country: Germany
- State: Mecklenburg-Vorpommern
- Disbanded: 2011
- Capital: Bergen

Area
  - Total: 973.92 km^{2} (376.03 sq mi)

Population (2010)
  - Total: 67,526
  - Density: 69.334/km^{2} (179.57/sq mi)
- Time zone: UTC+01:00 (CET)
  - Summer (DST): UTC+02:00 (CEST)
- Vehicle registration: RÜG
- Website: kreis-rueg.de

Rügen was a Kreis (district) in the northeastern part of Mecklenburg-Western Pomerania, Germany.

The district was bordered entirely by the Baltic Sea. The nearest districts were Nordvorpommern and the district-free city Stralsund. The district covered the islands Rügen and Hiddensee, and several small islands like Ummanz and Vilm. It was thus the only district of Germany which consists solely of islands.

== History ==
The district of Rügen was established in 1806 by the Swedish administration of Swedish Pomerania. At first, it was named Amt Bergen, in 1810, it was renamed to Kreis Bergen. On 4 September 2011, Rügen was merged to Vorpommern-Rügen.

== Coat of arms ==
The coat of arms derives from the coat of arms of the Principality of Rügen of the 13th century, with the only addition of a crown. The coat of arms were granted on January 18, 1993.

== Towns and municipalities ==
The subdivisions of the district were (situation August 2011):

Amt-free towns
1. Putbus
2. Sassnitz
Amt-free municipalities
1. Binz

Ämter
1. Bergen auf Rügen; 1. Bergen auf Rügen^{1, 2}; 2. Buschvitz; 3. Garz/Rügen^{2}; 4. Gustow; 5. Lietzow; 6. Parchtitz; 7. Patzig; 8. Poseritz; 9. Ralswiek; 10. Rappin; 11. Sehlen	2. Mönchgut-Granitz; 1. Baabe^{1}; 2. Gager; 3. Göhren; 4. Lancken-Granitz; 5. Middelhagen; 6. Sellin; 7. Thiessow; 8. Zirkow	3. Nord-Rügen; 1. Altenkirchen; 2. Breege; 3. Dranske; 4. Glowe; 5. Lohme; 6. Putgarten; 7. Sagard^{1}; 8. Wiek	4. West-Rügen; 1. Altefähr; 2. Dreschvitz; 3. Gingst; 4. Insel Hiddensee; 5. Kluis; 6. Neuenkirchen; 7. Rambin; 8. Samtens^{1}; 9. Schaprode; 10. Trent; 11. Ummanz
^{1} - seat of the Amt; ^{2} - town; ^{3} - former town/municipality
