= Rügen =

Island off the Pomeranian coast of Germany

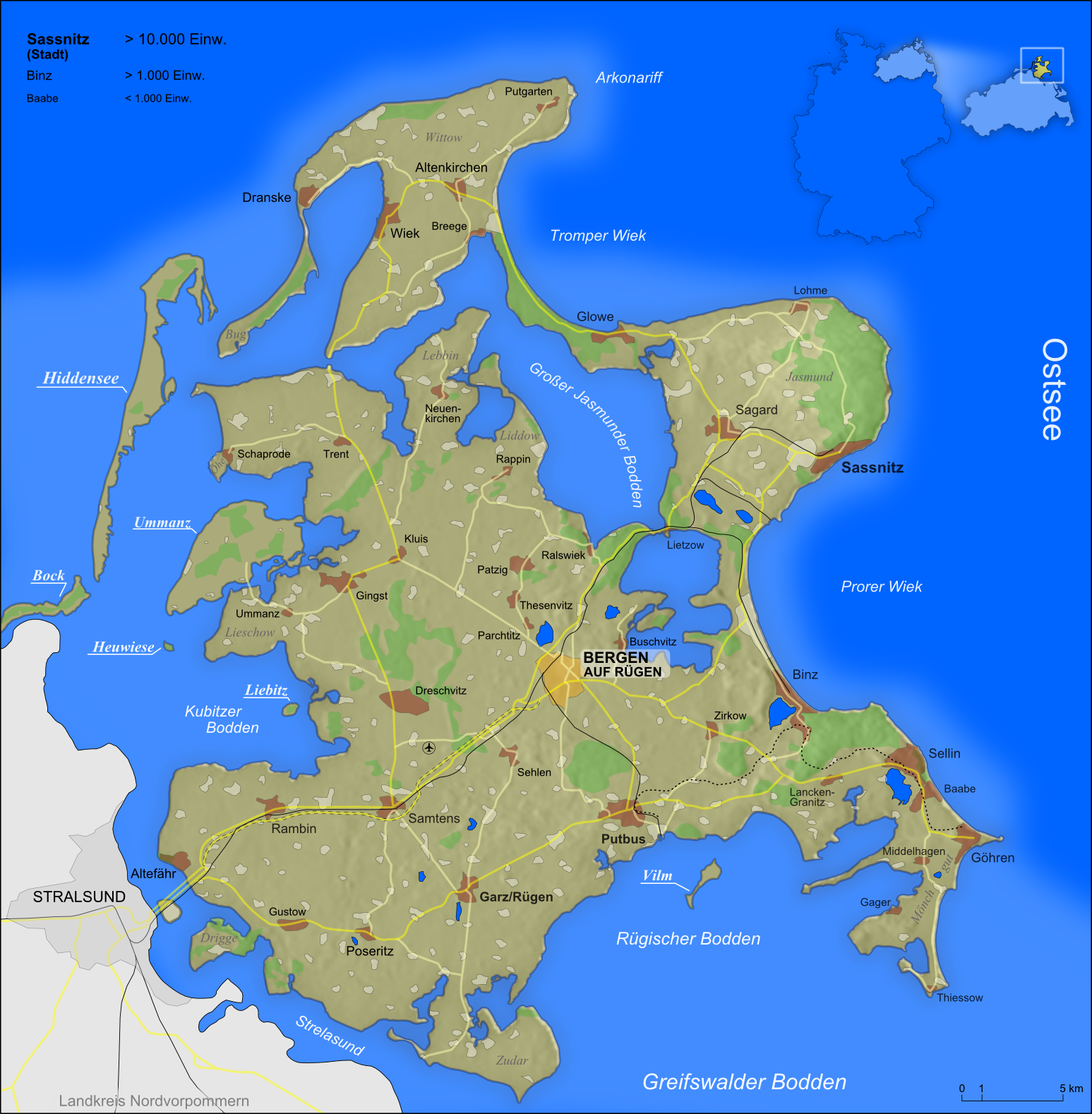
- Map of the island

- Location within Germany Location within Mecklenburg-Vorpommern

Geography
- Location: Baltic Sea
- Coordinates: 54°27′N 13°24′E
- Area: 926.4 km^{2} (357.7 sq mi)
- Length: 51.4 km (31.94 mi)
- Width: 42.8 km (26.59 mi)
- Coastline: 574 km (356.7 mi)
- Highest elevation: 161 m (528 ft)
- Highest point: Piekberg

Administration
- Germany
- State: Mecklenburg-Vorpommern
- District: Vorpommern-Rügen

Demographics
- Demonym: Rugians
- Population: 77,000 (2006)
- Pop. density: 79/km^{2} (205/sq mi)

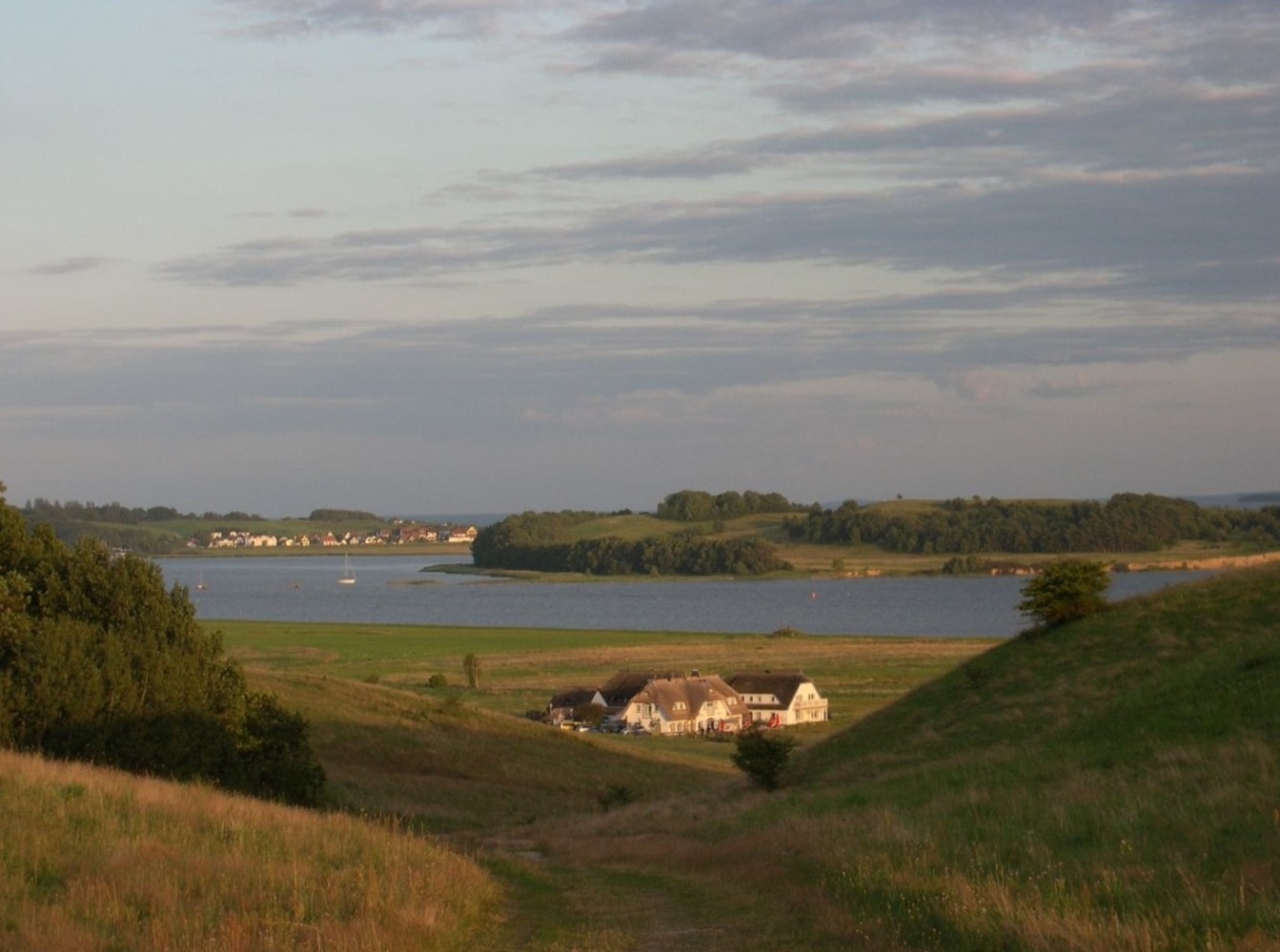
Mönchgut lagoon countryside

Rügen (German pronunciation: [ˈʁyːɡn̩]; Rani: Rȯjana, Rāna; Polish: Rugia) is Germany's largest island. It is located off the Pomeranian coast in the Baltic Sea and belongs to the state of Mecklenburg-Vorpommern.

The "gateway" to Rügen island is the Hanseatic city of Stralsund, where it is linked to the mainland by road and railway via the Rügen Bridge and Causeway, two routes crossing the two-kilometre-wide Strelasund, a sound of the Baltic Sea.

Rügen has a maximum length of 51.4 km (31.9 mi) (from north to south), a maximum width of 42.8 km (26.6 mi) in the south and an area of 926 km^{2} (358 sq mi). The coast is characterised by numerous sandy beaches, lagoons (Bodden) and open bays (Wieke), as well as peninsulas and headlands. In June 2011, UNESCO awarded the status of a World Heritage Site to the Jasmund National Park, characterised by vast stands of beeches and chalk cliffs like King's Chair, the main landmark of Rügen island.

The island of Rügen is part of the district of Vorpommern-Rügen, with its county seat in Stralsund.

The four towns on Rügen are Bergen, Sassnitz, Putbus and Garz. In addition, there are the Baltic seaside resorts of Binz, Baabe, Göhren, Sellin and Thiessow.

Rügen is very popular as a tourist destination because of its resort architecture, the diverse landscape and its long, sandy beaches.

== Geology ==
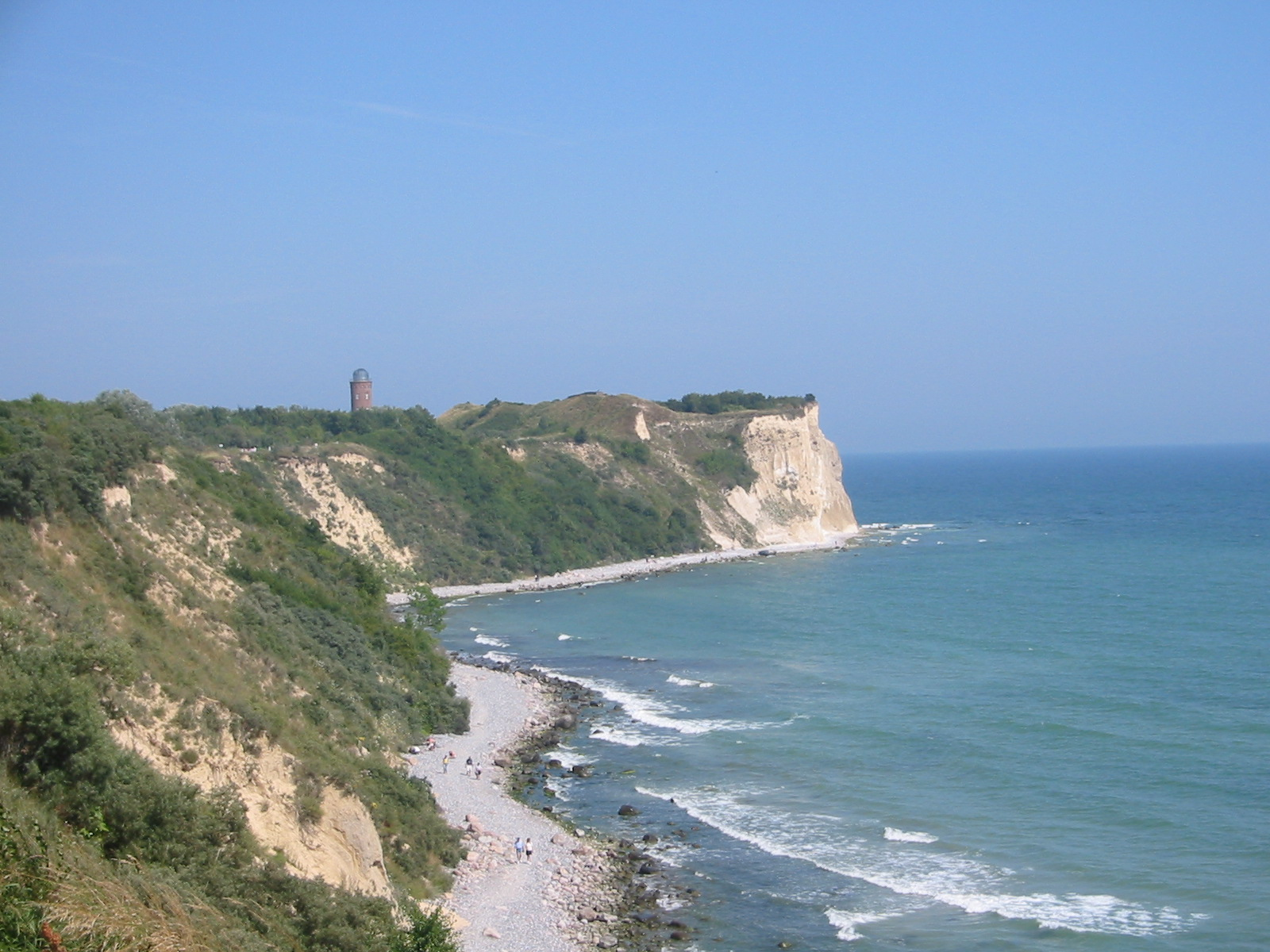
Cape Arkona

The chalk cliffs of the Jasmund peninsula belong to the Rügen Chalk unit and were formed during the Maastrichtian stage of the Late Cretaceous, around 70 million years ago.

== Geography ==
The main body of the island, known as Muttland, is surrounded by several peninsulas. To the north lie the peninsulas of Wittow and Jasmund, connected to each other by the Schaabe sandbar and to Muttland by the Schmale Heide, an embankment at Lietzow and the Wittow Ferry. The northern peninsulas are separated from Muttland by several lagoons or bodden, the largest of which are the Großer Jasmunder Bodden and Kleiner Jasmunder Bodden. Major peninsulas in the south are Zudar and Mönchgut which both face the Bay of Greifswald. Strelasund separates the island from the southern mainland.

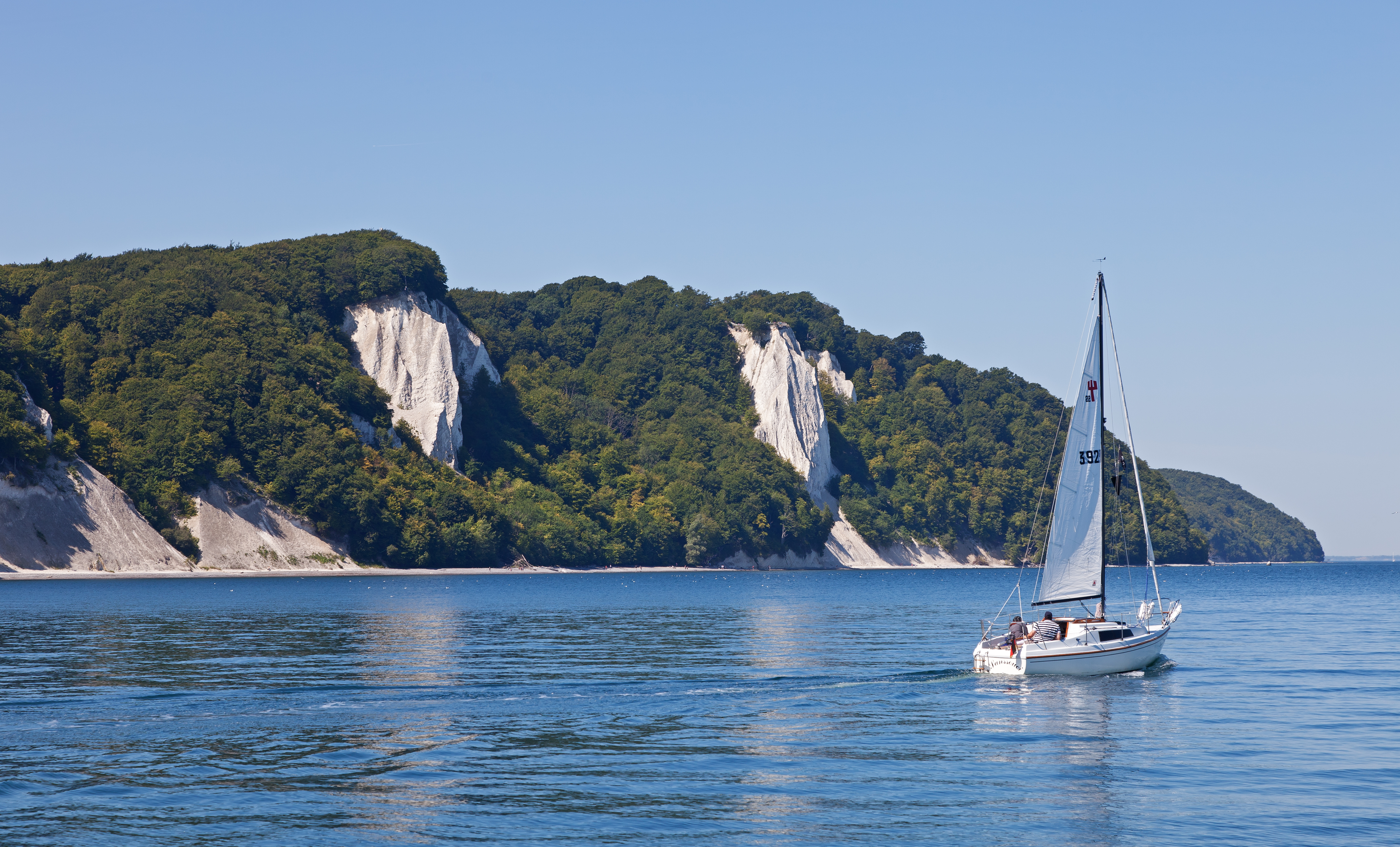
Jasmund National Park, with its chalk cliffs, the symbol of Rügen: Victoria-Sicht (Victoria's View) and Königsstuhl (King's Chair) from the Baltic Sea

Rügen has a total area of 926.4 km^{2} (357.7 sq mi), or 974 km^{2} (376 sq mi) if the adjacent small islands are included. The maximum diameter is 51.4 km (31.9 mi) from north to south, and 42.8 km (26.6 mi) from east to west. Of an overall 574 km-long (357 mi) coastline, 56 km (35 mi) are sandy Baltic Sea beaches, and 2.8 km (1.7 mi) sandy bodden beaches. The highest elevations are on the Jasmund peninsula: Piekberg (161 m or 528 ft) and Königsstuhl (117 m or 384 ft).

The northern part of the Bay of Greifswald, the Rügischer Bodden, is a large bay in the south of Rügen island, with the island of Vilm lying just offshore. At the western end of the bay, the peninsula of Zudar runs out to the southernmost point of Rügen (Palmer Ort), at the eastern end the highly indented peninsula of Mönchgut projects into the sea. This peninsula ends in the east at the cape of Nordperd near Göhren and in the south at the cape of Südperd by Thiessow. In the west of the peninsula of Mönchgut a narrow, 5 km-long (3.1 mi) bar, the Reddevitz Höft, separates the two bays of Having and Hagensche Wiek.

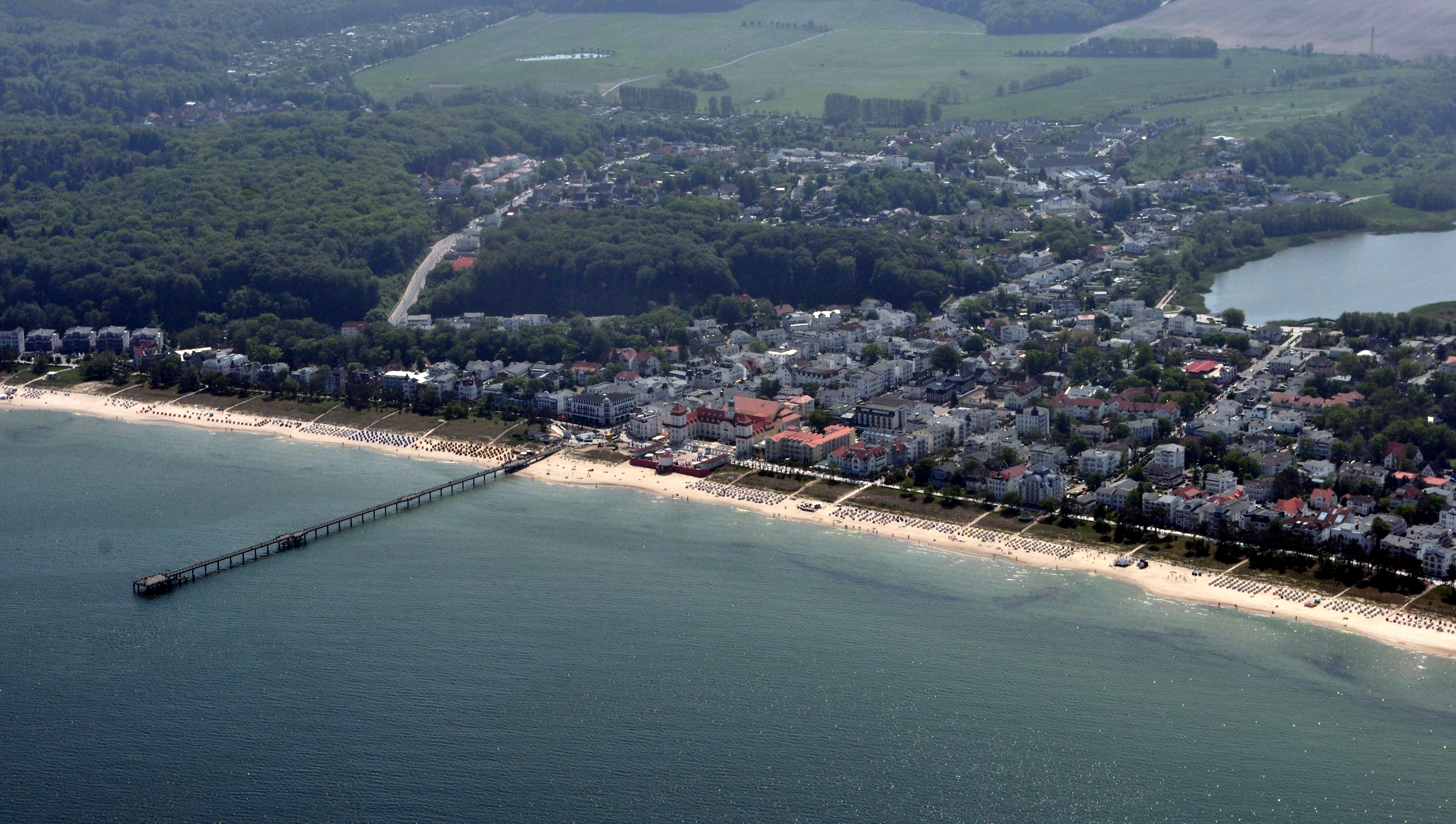
Binz

In the north-east of the island of Rügen is formed by the peninsula of Jasmund, which is joined to the heart of the island, Muttland, by the bar of Schmale Heide between Binz-Prora and Sassnitz-Mukran and by a rail and road embankment at Lietzow. The Schmale Heide separates the outer bay of Prorer Wiek from the lagoon of the Kleiner Jasmunder Bodden. On the peninsula of Jasmund are the Piekberg (161 m above sea level (NN)), the highest point on Rügen, and the Königsstuhl, a 118-metre-high (387 ft) chalk cliff in Stubbenkammer, which forms the most striking landmark on the island. Another bar, the Schaabe, links Jasmund to the peninsula of Wittow in the north of Rügen. The Schaabe, in turn, separates the outer bay of Tromper Wiek from the lagoon of the Großer Jasmunder Bodden. The peninsula of Wittow and the long, narrow peninsula of Bug to the west are separated from the main body of Rügen by the Rassower Strom, the Breetzer Bodden and the Breeger Bodden. The Wittow peninsula is adjoined in the north by Cape Arkona. Just under a kilometre to the northwest, located at 54°41' N, is the northernmost point of Mecklenburg-Vorpommern. Below this cliff (Gellort) on the shoreline is the Siebenschneiderstein – the fourth largest glacial erratic boulder on Rügen.

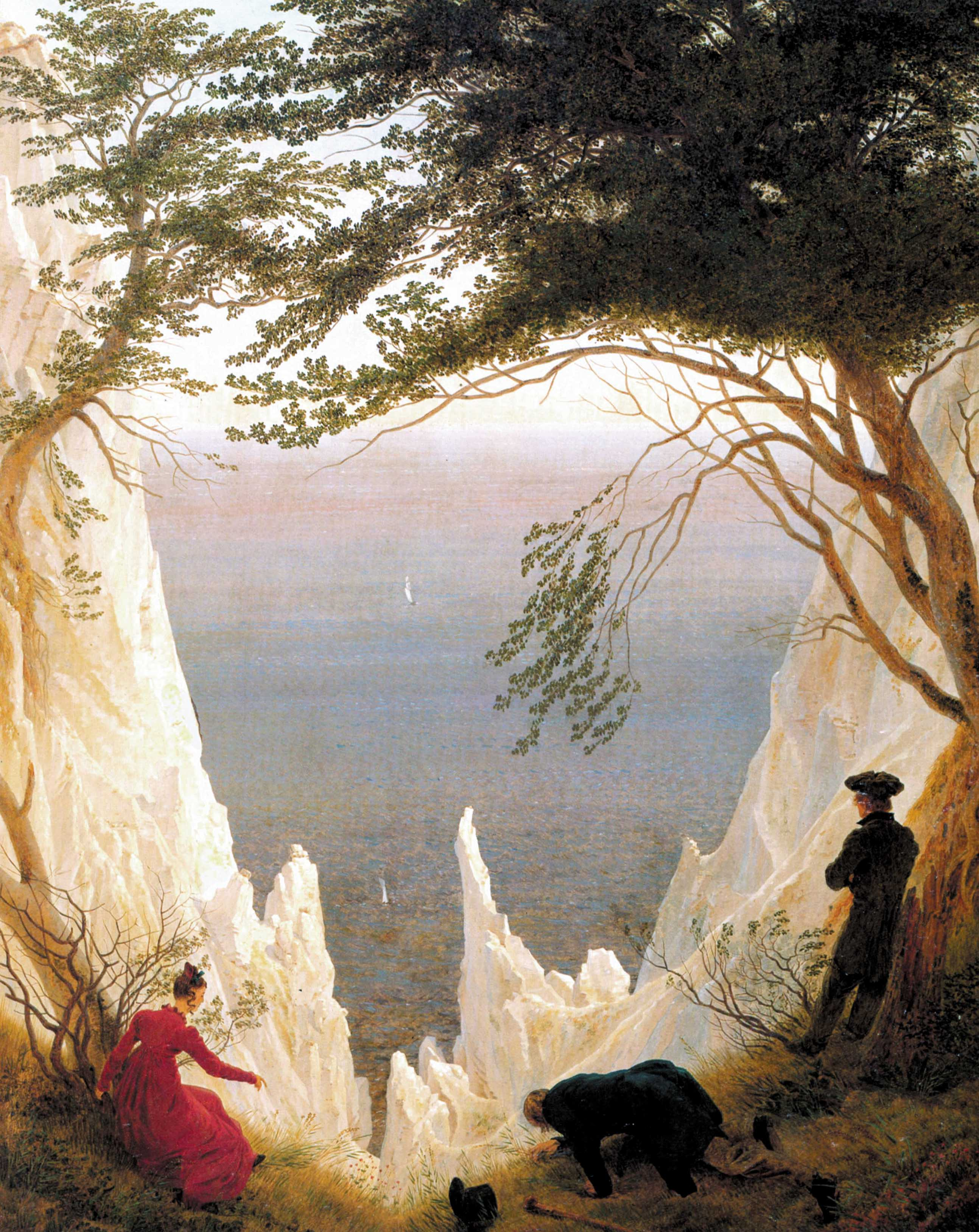
German Romantic painter Caspar Friedrich's Chalk Cliffs on Rügen

The northwestern and western sides of Rügen are also highly indented, but a little flatter. Offshore are the larger islands of Hiddensee and Ummanz as well as the smaller islands Öhe Liebitz and Heuwiese. Sand removal and deposition by the Baltic Sea has to be constantly countered by dredging operations to the north and south of Hiddensee, otherwise Hiddensee would merge with Rügen within a few years. Rügen is dotted with many glacial erratic boulders, of which the 22 largest belong to legally-protected geotopes (see also: Erratics on and around Rügen).

=== Land use ===
The heartland of Rügen is gently rolling, and the area is characterised primarily by agriculture. East of the town of Bergen auf Rügen the land climbs to 90 metres (300 ft) (at Rugard where there is an observation tower) and to 107 metres (351 ft) in the southeastern hill country of the Granitz. The soil on Rügen is very fertile and productive, particularly in Wittow, the breadbasket of the island. There are major cabbage-producing regions.

Two German national parks are situated on Rügen: the Western Pomerania Lagoon Area National Park, in the west (including Hiddensee), and the Jasmund National Park, a smaller park including the chalk cliffs (Königsstuhl). There is also a nature reserve, the Southeast Rügen Biosphere Reserve, consisting of the peninsulas in the southeast.

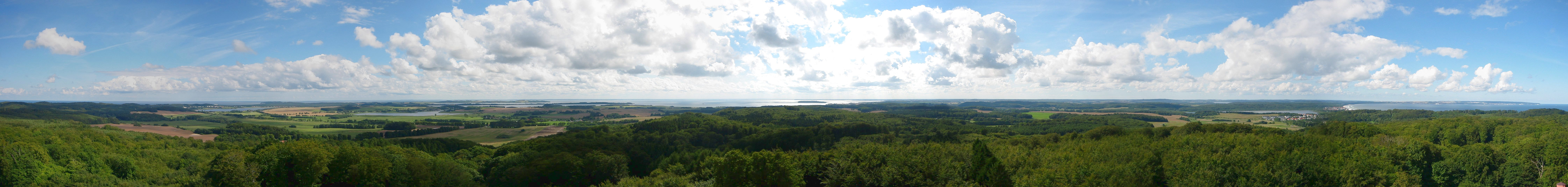
Panoramic view over Rügen from Granitz Castle near Binz

=== Climate ===
Köppen map of Rügen

The climate is in the temperate zone. According to the Köppen climate classification the northern parts of the island and the coastal regions (apart from those lay adjacent to Strelasund) are under the influence of the oceanic climate (Cfb), meanwhile the remaining majority of the area is dominated by the humid continental climate (Dfb). The winters are not particularly cold, with mean temperatures in January and February of 0.0 °C (32.0 °F); and summers are mild and temperate, with a mean temperature in August of 16.3 °C (61.3 °F). There is an average rainfall of 520–560 mm (20–22 in) and approximately 1800–1870 hours of sunshine annually.

== Administration ==
Administratively, Rügen is part of the district Vorpommern-Rügen. Its subdivisions are the Ämter Bergen auf Rügen (municipalities Bergen auf Rügen, Buschvitz, Garz, Gustow, Lietzow, Parchtitz, Patzig, Poseritz, Ralswiek, Rappin, Sehlen and Thesenvitz), West-Rügen (municipalities Altefähr, Dreschvitz, Gingst, Hiddensee, Kluis, Neuenkirchen, Rambin, Samtens, Schaprode, Trent and Ummanz), Nord-Rügen (municipalities Altenkirchen, Breege, Dranske, Glowe, Lohme, Putgarten, Sagard, Wiek) and Mönchgut-Granitz (municipalities Baabe, Göhren, Lancken-Granitz, Middelhagen, Sellin, Thiessow and Zirkow) and the Amt-free municipalities of Binz, Putbus and Sassnitz. Overall, there are 45 municipalities on Rügen, four of which have town status (Bergen, Garz, Putbus and Sassnitz).

== History ==
Historical affiliations

Rani (Tribe) 7th Century-1168/1169
Principality of Rügen (Denmark) 1168–1325
Pomerania-Wolgast 1325-1368/1372
Pomerania-Barth 1368/1372-1451
Pomerania-Wolgast 1451-1478
Duchy of Pomerania 1478-1648
Swedish Pomerania (Sweden) 1648-1677
Denmark-Norway 1677-1678
Swedish Pomerania (Sweden) 1678
Denmark-Norway 1678-1679
Swedish Pomerania (Sweden) 1679-1807
First French Empire 1807-1813
Swedish Pomerania (Sweden) 1813-1814
Denmark-Norway 1814-1815
Kingdom of Prussia (From 1871 German Empire) 1815-1918
German Empire 1871-1918
Free State of Prussia (Weimar Republic until 1933) 1918-1947
Weimar Republic 1918-1933
Nazi Germany 1933-1945
Soviet occupation zone in Germany 1945-1949
East Germany 1949-1990
Germany 1990-Present

=== Pre-history and the Germani ===
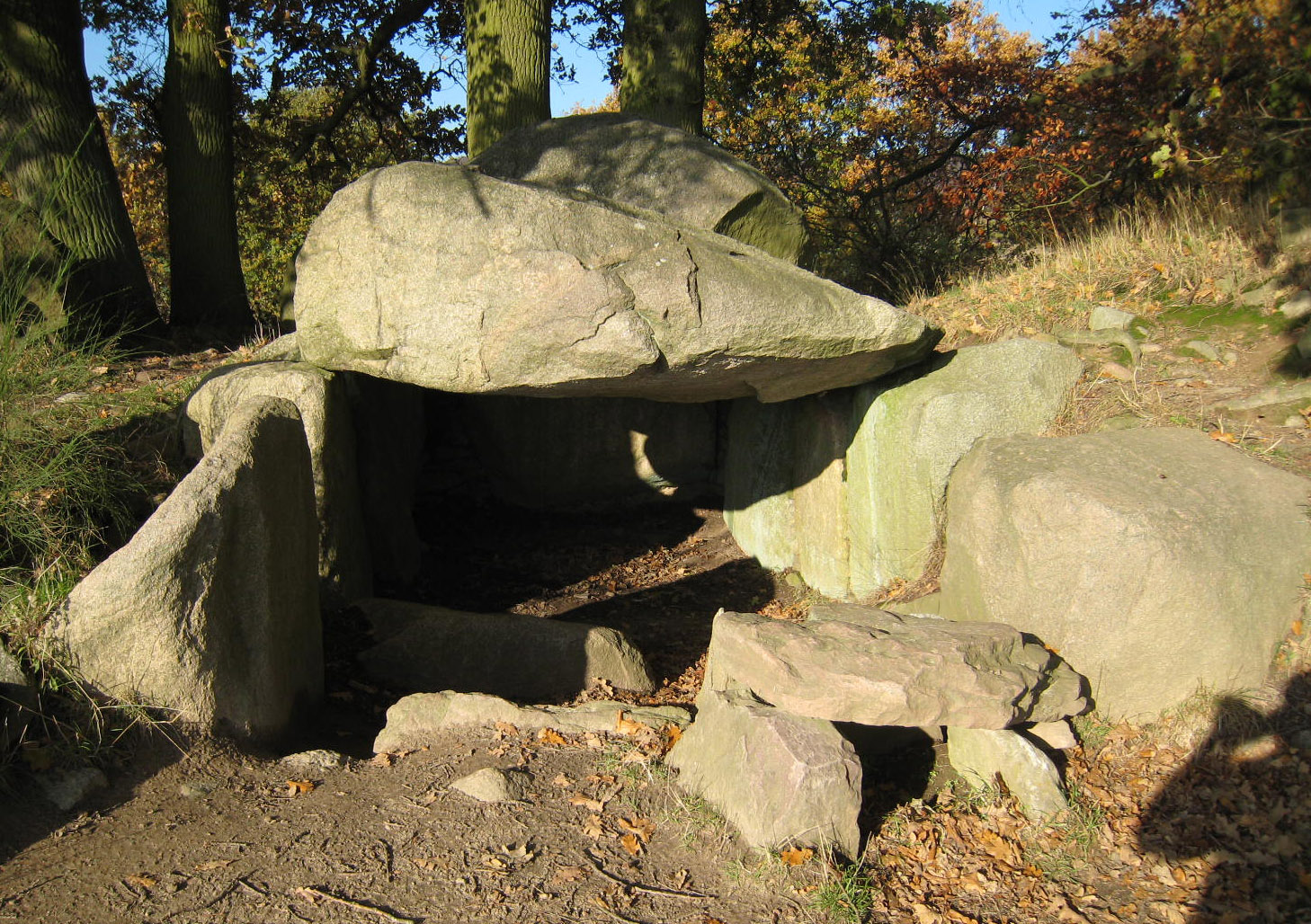
One of many megalith sites on Rügen: the Lancken-Granitz dolmen

Discoveries in the bodden indicate that there has been settlement here since the Stone Age. All over Rügen are numerous stone monuments, such as megalithic tombs and altar stones that have survived to the present day. By the 1st century, the inhabitants of Rügen were part of the East Germanic tribe of Rugii, who occupied roughly the region that was later to become Western Pomerania and who gave the island its name. The Rugii may have originated from Scandinavia or evolved from autochthonous tribes. In the Migration Period, many Rugii moved south and founded an empire in Pannonia.

=== Slavic Rani ===
From the 7th century, the West Slavic Rani (or Rujani) built an empire on Rügen and the neighbouring coast between Recknitz and Ryck. It decidedly affected the history of the Baltic Sea area and the surrounding Obodritic (in the west) and Liutician (in the south) occupied mainland for the next few centuries. Many traces of their life can be found today.

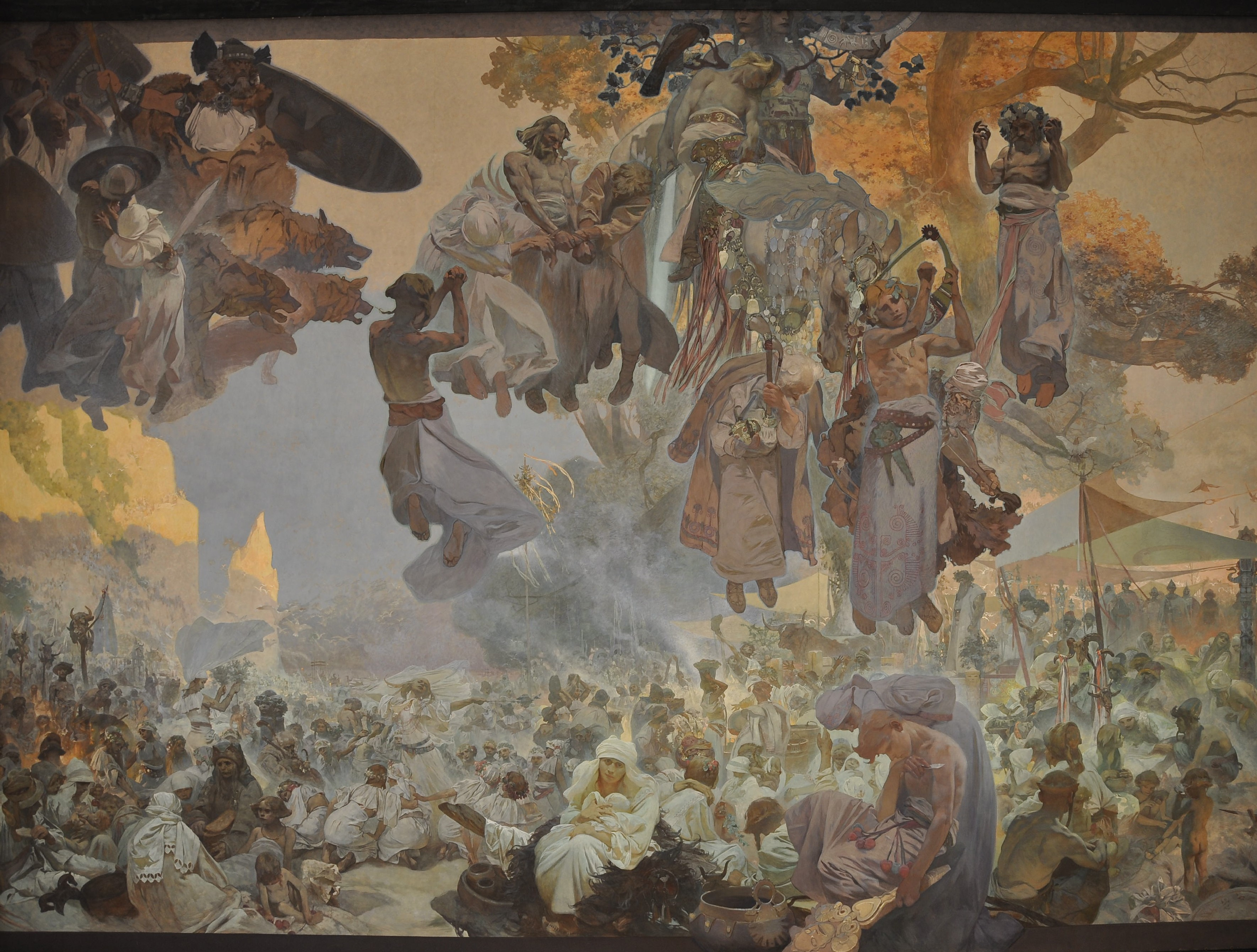
The Celebration of Svetovid on Rügen (1912), Alphonse Mucha, The Slav Epic

The basis of their military strength was a combination of the Ranian navy and a favourable location. Denmark, which was at that time very successful in Great Britain and Scandinavia, was neither able to match its Ranian rivals in the Baltic Sea region nor protect its coastline from Ranian armies until well into the 12th century. Meanwhile, the Ranians built numerous castles and temples in the Barth-Jasmund-Gristow triangle.

The temple hill of Jaromarsburg, at the northern tip of Rügen and dedicated to the god Svetovid, was significant well beyond the boundaries of the Ranian empire. After the fall of Radgosc it became the chief shrine for the pagan northwestern Slavs. The administrative centre of the empire was Charenza, possibly on the site of the present-day hillfort known as Garz or Venz. The main trading centre of the empire was Ralswiek at the southernmost point of the Großer Jasmunder Bodden.

=== Principality under Danish suzerainty ===
In 1168, the Danish king, Valdemar I, and his army commander and advisor, Bishop Absalon of Roskilde destroyed the Svetovid temple in the hillfort at Cape Arkona, ending both the territorial and religious autonomy of the Rani; their former monarchs became Danish princes of Rügen. The Rani prince Jaromar I (died 1218) was a vassal of the Danish king and Christianized the island's inhabitants. In 1184, the Pomeranians, whose rule had previously extended as far as the land of Gützkow and to Demmin and thus made them the immediate neighbours of the now Danish Principality of Rugia, were commissioned by their overlord, the Holy Roman Emperor, to seize Rügen for the empire, but were defeated in the Bay of Greifswald.

Under Danish rule the Principality of Rugia changed its character. Danish monasteries were established (e.g. Bergen Abbey in 1193 and Hilda Abbey, today Eldena Abbey, in 1199). German colonists were introduced into the land and soon they became the largest and most culturally influential group within the population. The Slavic cultural element disappeared, mostly due to the lack of their own Slavic church structures, so that the Rani were absorbed in the period that followed into the now German-influenced people of Rügen. In addition to the colonization of the country and the building of new monasteries and churches, towns were also re-established. In 1234, the Rügen Prince Wizlaw I founded the town of Stralsund and granted Greifswald market rights in 1241. The power of the towns grew rapidly, forcing Rügen's rulers to make concessions—for example, the prince's castle at Barth was slighted and Schadegast, the princely "twin" of the municipally-controlled Stralsund, was ousted in favour of the latter.

In 1304 a storm surge, known as the All Saints' Flood, devastated the island and flooded the peninsula between Mönchgut and Ruden.

=== Part of Pomerania ===
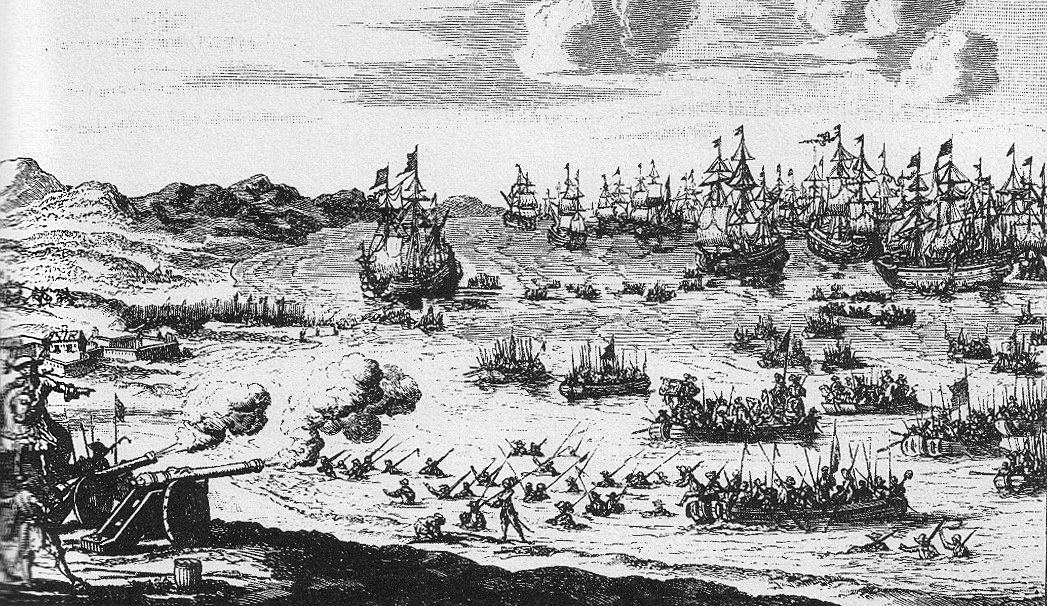
Invasion of Rügen by Brandenburg-Prussia at Neukamp in 1678 (etching by Jan Luiken)

1608 map by Eilhardus Lubinus

After the death of the last Slav prince of the Wizlawiden (House of Wizlaw) dynasty, Wizlaw III, in 1325, the principality was acquired by the duchy of Pomerania-Wolgast as a consequence of the 1321 inheritance agreement (Erbverbrüderung), and from 1368/72–1451 was part of the estate of a branch line, the dukes of Pomerania-Barth. This state of affairs, together with the disputes over the Danish throne that occurred at that time, led to the Rügen wars of succession. After they had played out, the former principality went in 1354 to Pomerania-Wolgast and thus became part of the Holy Roman Empire.

In 1478, Pomerania-Wolgast and Pomerania-Stettin were united and, 170 years later, the combined state went to Sweden in 1648 as a result of the Treaty of Westphalia (see Swedish Pomerania). Rügen was part of Swedish Pomerania from 1648 to 1815. The largest landowners, owning at least one-fifth of the island until 1945, was the House of Putbus, which was an offshoot of the earlier ruling princes of the Wizlawid dynasty. In 1727, they were created counts of Holy Roman Empire and 1731 counts in Sweden, ultimately Swedish princes in 1807.

Under Gustav IV Adolf of Sweden the town of Gustavia was constructed on the Mönchgut peninsula, but was abandoned during the Napoleonic Wars. In the years 1678 and 1715, Rügen was briefly wrested from the Swedes by the Elector of Brandenburg, Frederick William and by the King in Prussia, Frederick William I. For example, a Brandenburg-Danish army landed on the island as part of the invasion of Rügen in 1678. After the Treaty of Saint-Germain in 1679 the island passed from Danish to Swedish ownership again. At the time of Napoleonic Wars, Rügen was held by the French from 1807 (when it was occupied during the Franco-Swedish War) to 1810 and fron 1912 to 1813. In the Treaty of Kiel of 1814, it was transferred initially from Sweden to Denmark and then fell to Prussia, along with New Western Pomerania (Neuvorpommern), thanks to the Vienna Convention of 1815. In 1818, the island became part of the administrative district of Stralsund and thus belonged to the Prussian Province of Pomerania. Wilhelm Malte I (1783–1854), 1st prince of Putbus, was the last Governor of Swedish Pomerania and the first under Prussian rule.

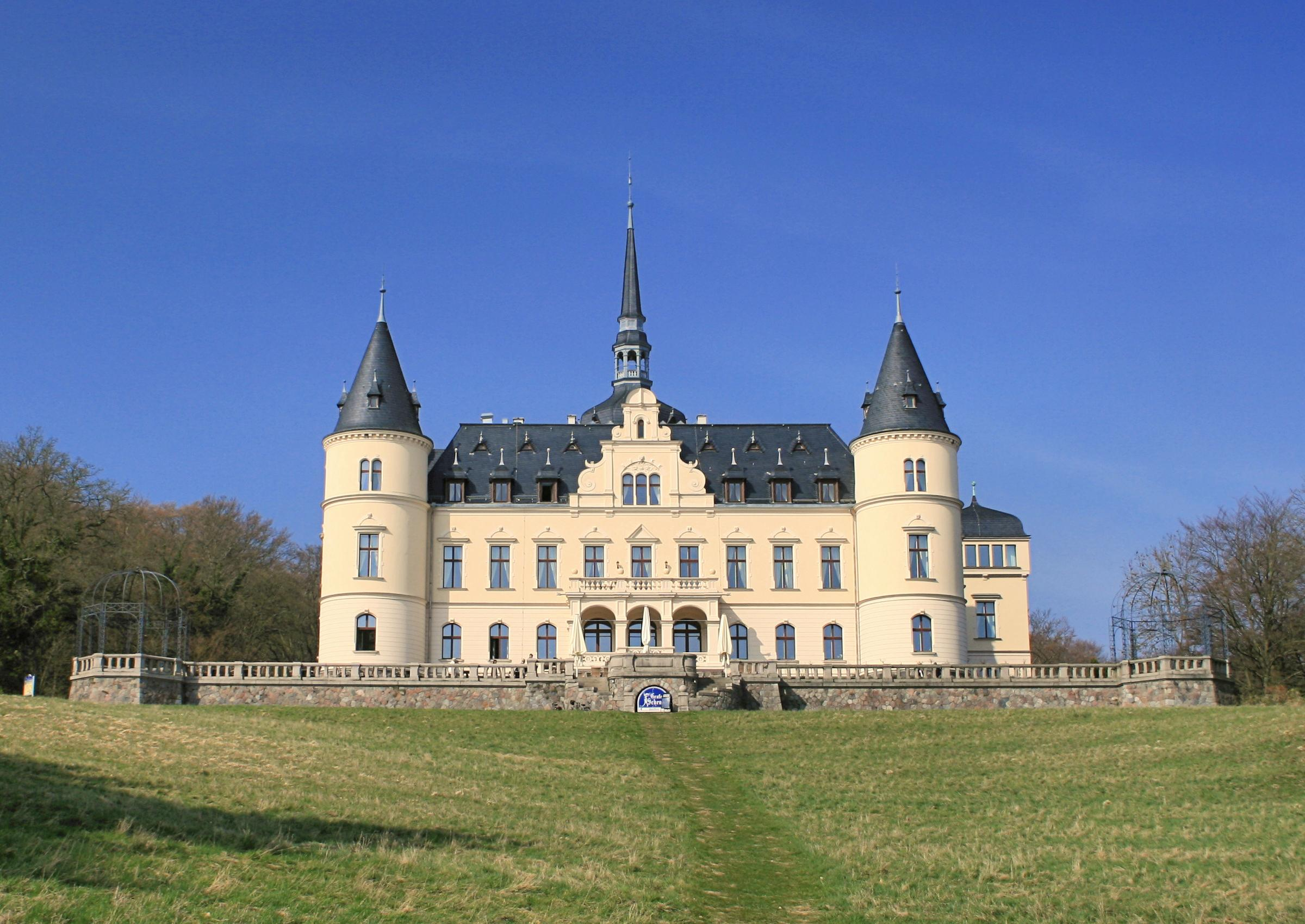
Ralswiek Castle

In 1816, the first bathing resort was founded at Putbus. Later more resorts were established, and Rügen remained the most popular holiday resort of Germany until World War II.

=== German Empire ===
Rügen was a popular destination for exile of Catholic priests and clergy during Kulturkampf between 1875 and 1879.

=== Nazi era ===
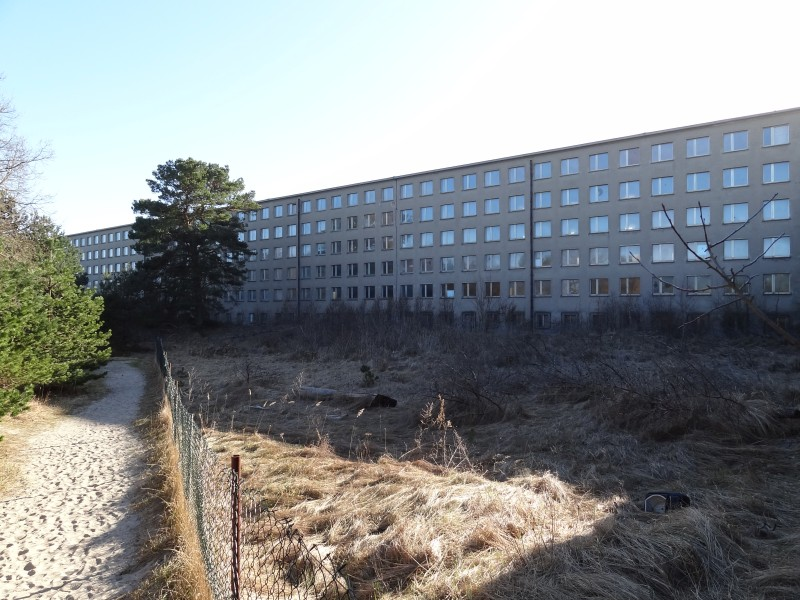
KdF Building Prora

The Nazis added a large resort: Prora, planned by the Strength through Joy organisation, which aimed to occupy people's free time. However, Prora was never completed.

In 1936, the first bridge connecting Rügen with the mainland was constructed (Rügendamm), replacing the former ferry shuttles.

The operation commanded by Wolfram von Richthofen that bombed the town of Guernica during the Spanish Civil War, was named after the island. An Abwehr signals intelligence operation during the same conflict was titled Operation Bodden after the strait separating Rügen from the German mainland.

In the aftermath of World War II, East German and Soviet authorities exiled landholders from the mainland to the island.

=== GDR era ===
After the Second World War, Rügen became part of the state of Mecklenburg within the German Democratic Republic (GDR). In 1952, the island became part of the district of Rostock.

The island was the focal point of Project Rose (Action Rose) by the GDR government designed to nationalise hotels, taxis and service companies on 10 February 1953. The occasion was supposed to have been a visit by Walter Ulbricht to the island of Rügen, during which he had been annoyed by the many surviving private hotels and guest houses. Many of the hotel owners were convicted by kangaroo courts under the pretext of having been engaged in economic crime or as agents working for the West. Their property was then confiscated and they were sent to prison. Many of the owners and small businessmen were incarcerated in Bützow prison. The hotels were supposed to have been expropriated by the Free German Trade Union Federation (FDGB). In fact, they were used as accommodation for the barracks-based "people's police" (Kasernierte Volkspolizei or CPI). As a result of the confiscation of hotels, tourism on Rügen in 1953 came almost to a complete standstill for a time.

In the following nearly four decades, the island became one of the main tourist areas in the GDR. The FDGB played a dominant role in tourist accommodation. In 1963 the FDGB had 7,519 holiday places, the Reisebüro der DDR 2,906 places and a further 5,025 were available for businesses and organisations. In addition, there were 12,245 places for children in summer camps and another 20,800 places for campers. The plots were located mainly near the beaches. Increased holiday capacity was not however generated until the 1970s and 1980s.

=== Reunited Germany ===
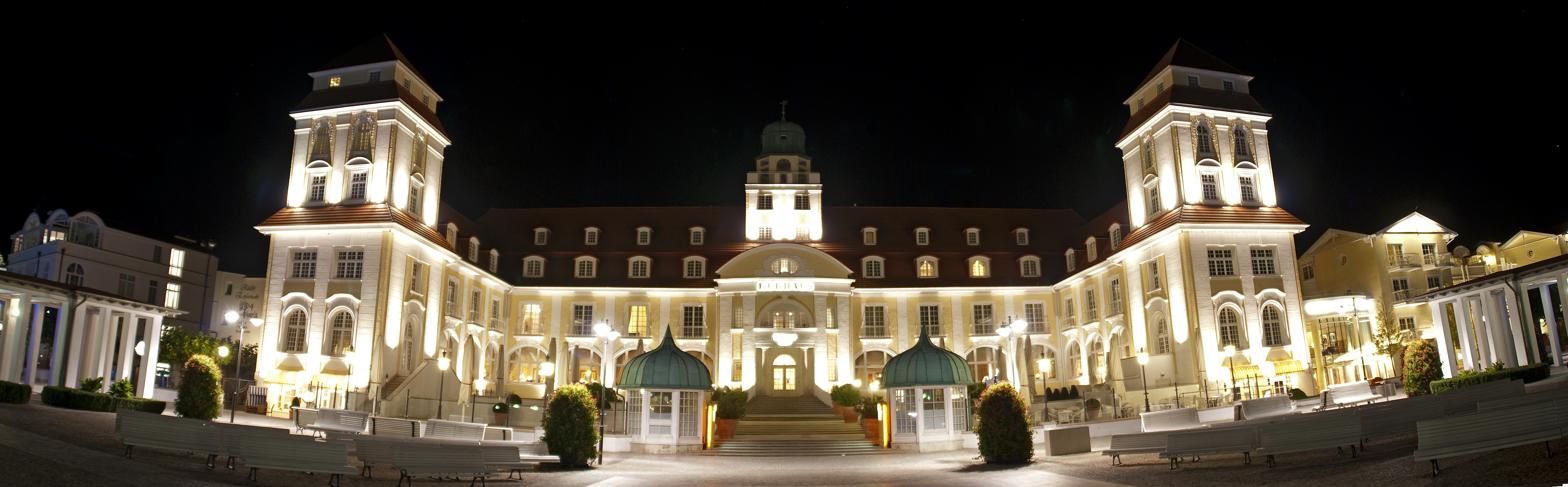
Binz, one of several spas on Rügen, featuring the typical Resort architecture of the German Baltic Sea — Kurhaus (spa hotel) at night

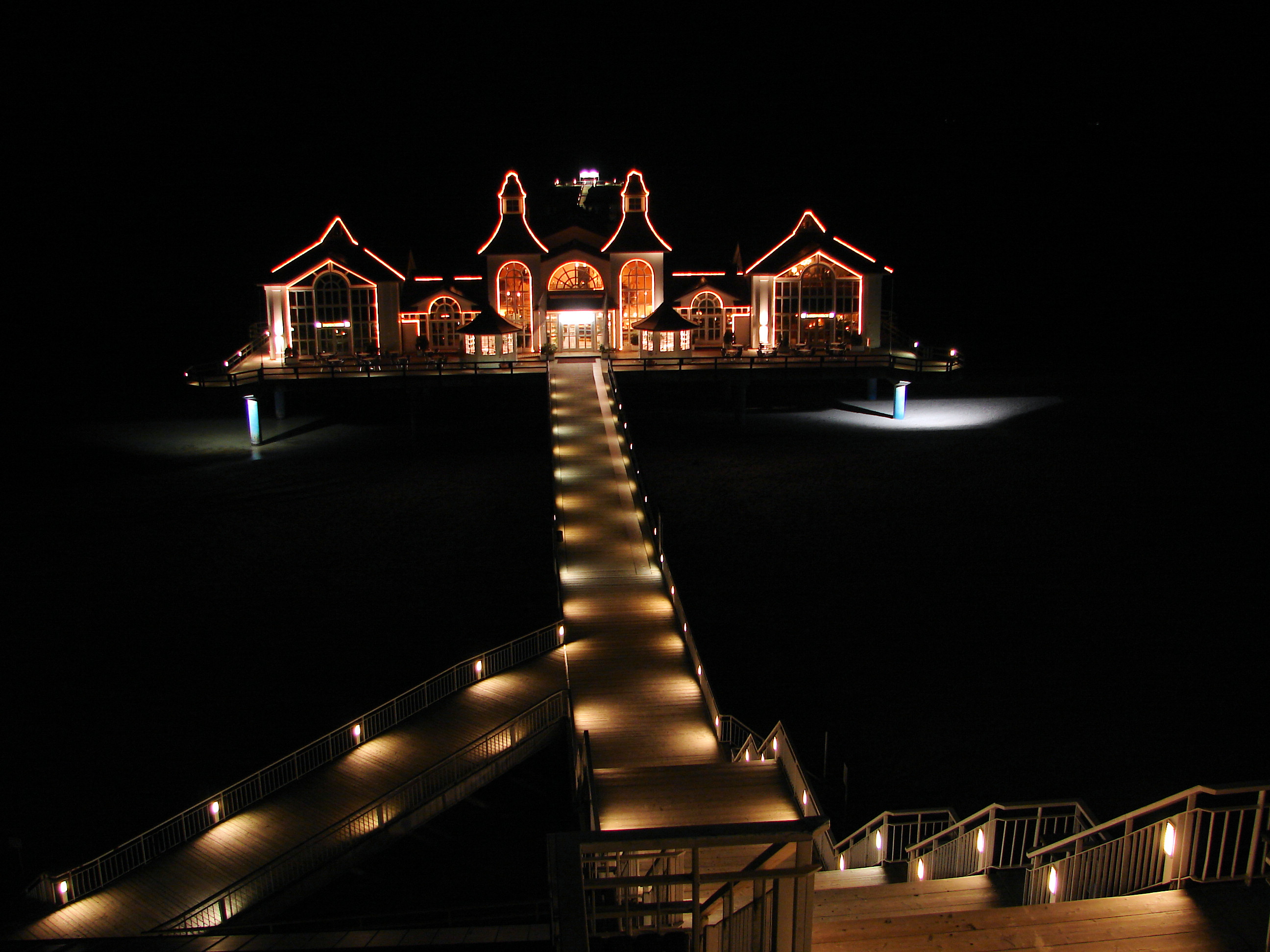
The pier of Sellin at night

In 1990, Rügen became part of the new state of Mecklenburg-Vorpommern and, together with the neighbouring islands of Hiddensee and Ummanz, formed the district of Rügen. Since the 2011 Mecklenburg-Vorpommern district reforms, Rügen has been part of Vorpommern-Rügen.

In 2007, a second bridge, the Rügen Bridge (Rügenbrücke), was built to replace the first one built in 1936.

Rügen has now surpassed Sylt as the most popular German island again.

== Tourist resorts ==
Rügen is one of the most popular holiday destinations in Germany. The island receives about one quarter of all overnight stays in Mecklenburg-Vorpommern. Most visitors come to Rügen between April and October, the peak season being from June to August, but its quiet atmosphere in winter is also appreciated.

The first bathing facility on Rügen opened in 1794 at the mineral-rich spring in Sagard. In 1818, the Putbus village of Lauterbach became Rügen's first seaside resort. In the 1860s Sassnitz became a seaside resort, followed by Binz in the 1880s. During World War II Prora was constructed as a mass tourist resort but it was never finished.

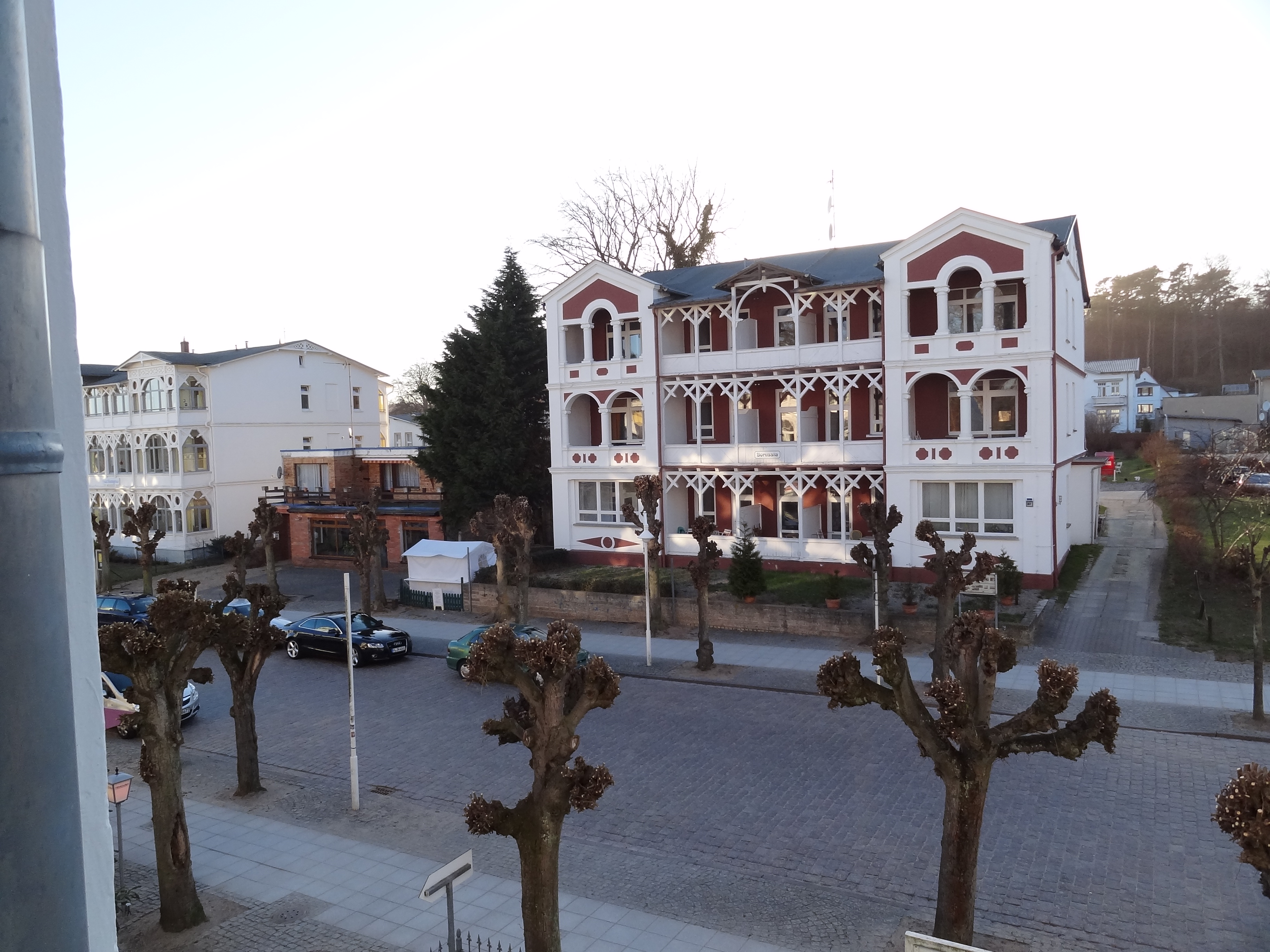
Sellin Architecture

Today the most popular seaside resorts are the Schaabe beaches between Altenkirchen and Juliusruh including Drewoldke, Glowe and Breege, and the eastern beaches between Sassnitz and Göhren including Neu Mukran, Prora, Binz, Sellin and Baabe. The latter are accessible via an historic narrow-gauge railway employing steam locomotives, called the Rügensche Bäderbahn. Tourist destinations, other than seaside resorts, include Cape Arkona, the wood-covered Stubbenkammer hills on Jasmund with interesting chalk cliff formations, the wood-covered Granitz hills with their Jagdschloß or hunting lodge, the classicist buildings of Putbus and the inland villages of Bergen auf Rügen, Ralswiek and Gingst.

The island offers a huge variety of different beach and shore areas. Rügen is often visited by windsurfers and kitesurfers and offers more than fifteen different locations for surfing. The most popular locations are Dranske, Rosengarten, Wiek, Suhrendorf and Neu Mukran.

On the peninsula of Jasmund is the Jasmund National Park, which consists of the beech forest of Stubnitz, including the chalk cliffs of Rügen. On the Königsstuhl itself is the Königsstuhl National Park Centre, which has a multivision cinema and audio-guide exhibitions with information about the national park in several languages.

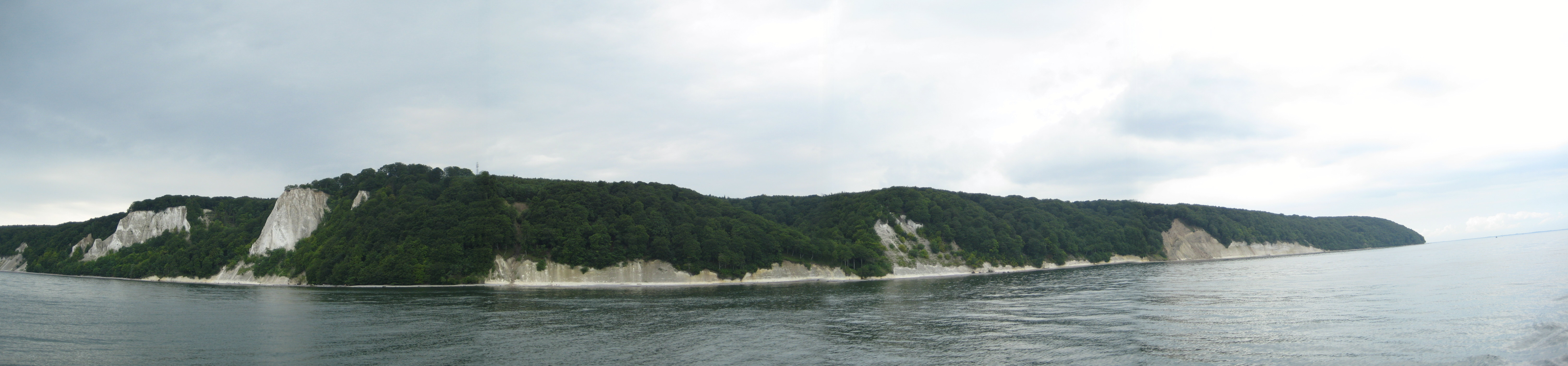
Jasmund National Park chalk cliffs

== Transport ==
=== Rail ===
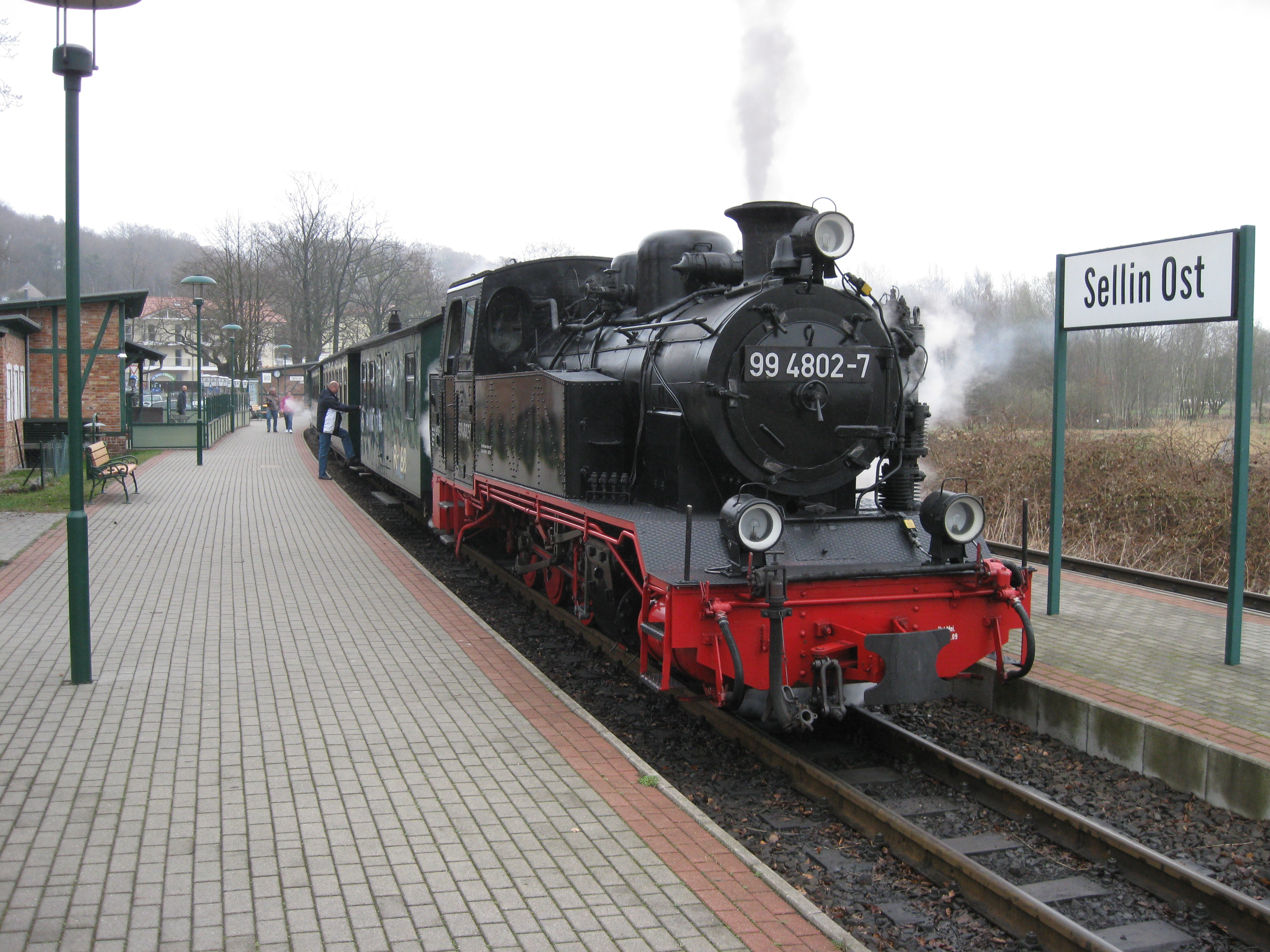
Rasender Roland ("Rushing Roland") is Rügen's historical steam-powered railway, that runs from Putbus to Binz, Baabe, Sellin and Göhren.

The railway network consists of the electrified standard gauge stretch of the Deutsche Bahn Stralsund (Rügendamm)-Bergen-Sassnitz line (timetable route (KBS) 195), Lietzow-Binz (KBS 197), the non-electrified routes Bergen-Putbus-Lauterbach Mole of the PRESS (KBS 198) and the narrow-gauge stretch (750 mm (2 ft 5 1/2 in)) of the Rügen Resort Railway (Rasender Roland): Lauterbach Mole-Putbus-Binz-Sellin-Göhren (KBS 199).

In addition to regional trains, there are also Intercity services from Binz via Bergen and Stralsund to Berlin, Hamburg, Frankfurt, Stuttgart and the Ruhr. Night train services to Munich, Basle and the Ruhr area were deleted from the timetable on 9 December 2007, despite massive protests from the local hotel industry.

=== Bus ===
The bus service on Rügen is operated by the Rügener Personennahverkehr. Since 1996 it has been continuously expanded, and has developed an integral clock-face schedule. There is a service between all major towns and municipalities on the island at least every two hours, sometimes more frequently during peak season. Throughout the year, buses now run at least every hour on the routes between Sassnitz-Binz-Bergen, Schaprode–Bergen–Klein Zicker, Bergen/Sassnitz-Altenkirchen-Wiek-Dranske and the Altenkirchen-Putgarten near Cape Arkona. In addition, the bus service is well-linked with the railway, especially in Bergen, but also at other railway stations.

=== Road ===
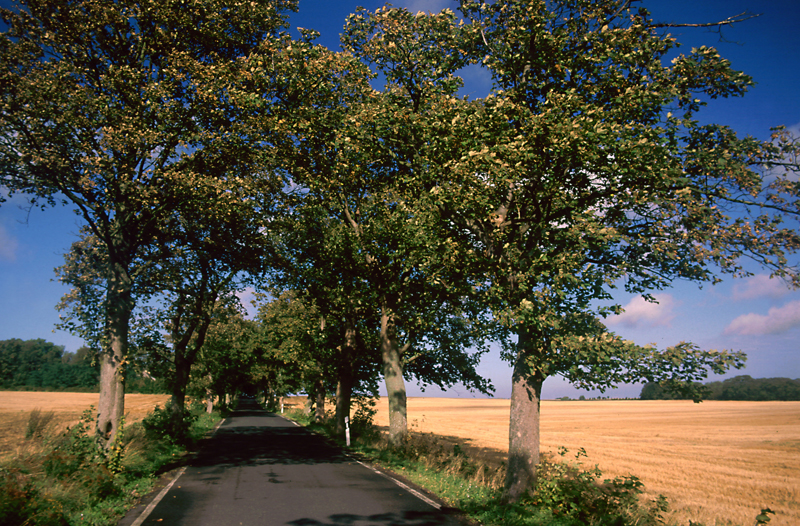
Typical avenue on Rügen. The German Avenue Road starts in Sellin on the island and leads down to the far South of Germany (until Lake Constance).

Until October 2007, individual traffic from the mainland to the island of Rügen was mainly routed along the two-lane Rügendamm causeway, running between Stralsund and Altefähr over the sound of Strelasund.

The cornerstone for a second crossing over the Strelasund was laid on 31 August 2004. This bridge, the Rügen Bridge, running parallel to the Rügendamm, has a length of about 4.1 kilometres (2.5 mi) and a vertical clearance for ships of 42 metres (138 ft), and was on opened on 20 October 2007. In order to relieve the town of Stralsund, a ring road has been built in the last few years, coming from the southwest. The B 96 federal road between Stralsund and Greifswald is also connected via an access road to the A 20 motorway. The B 96 runs from Stralsund via Bergen to Sassnitz. Here a new route with bypasses is planned (the "New B 96").

The main tourist attractions of Cape Arkona, the Königsstuhl and the Granitz hunting lodge are, however, car-free in order to protect the countryside, as is the island of Hiddensee which belongs to Vorpommern-Rügen district. All these destinations can be reached using public transport, without needing a car.

=== Cycling ===
Rügen has a signposted network of cycle paths. The condition and signing of this network varies considerably from one place to another, from very good in the seaside resorts to poor in the area between Garz and Zudar. There is a circular cycle path around the whole island. During the summer season there is the option on some routes to carry bicycles on the buses. This is always possible on the railways.

=== Ship ===
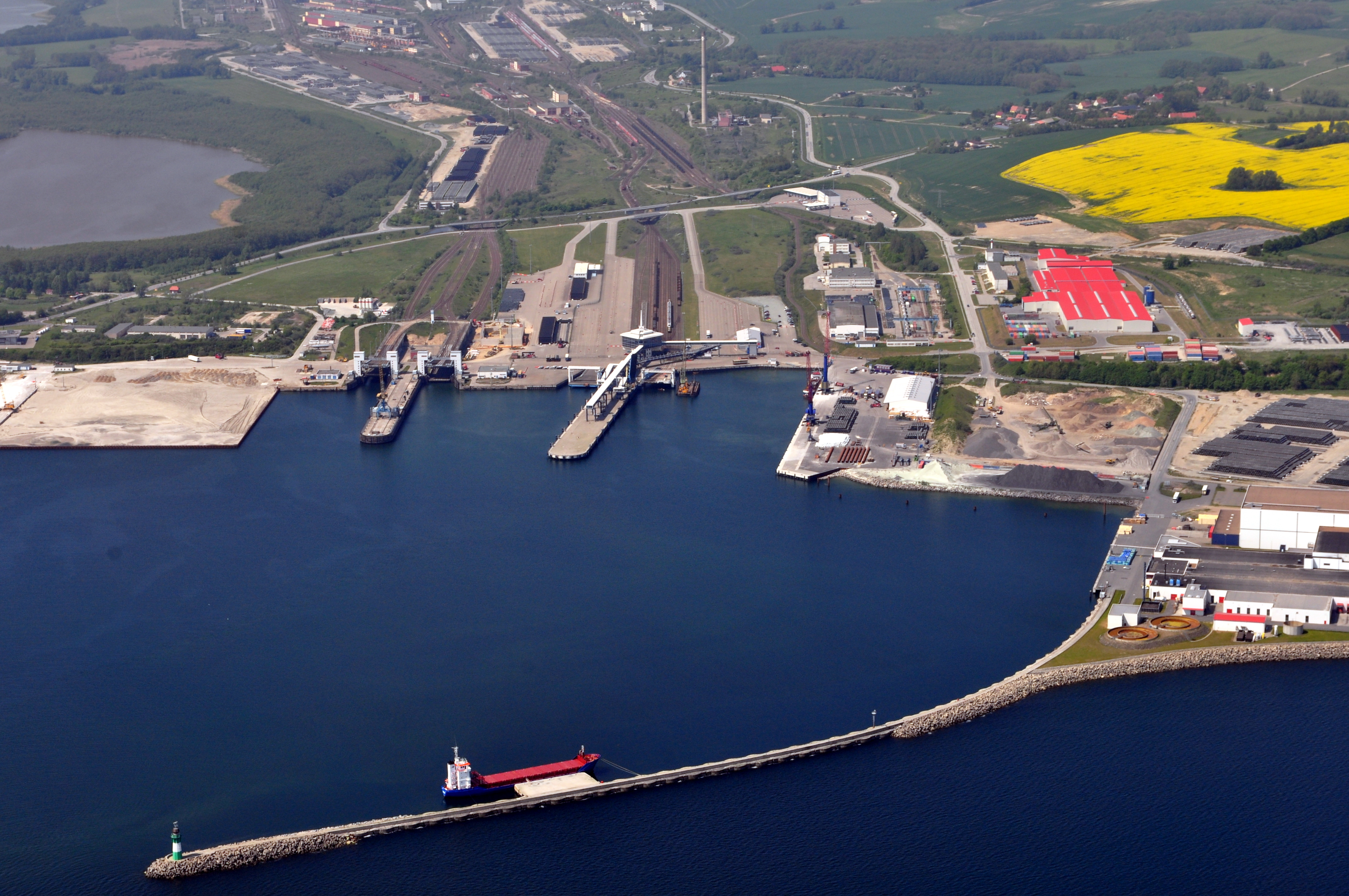
Ferry port Mukran (part of Sassnitz)

Two car ferries belonging to the Weiße Flotte operate every half-an-hour between the Zudar peninsula on Rügen and Stahlbrode on the mainland, halfway between Stralsund and Greifswald.

Another Weiße Flotte car ferry, the Wittow Ferry runs from the heartland of Rügen (Muttland) to Wittow.

A ferry sails from Sassnitz ferry port in Mukran to the Danish island of Bornholm, to Swedish Trelleborg, to Klaipėda (formerly Memel) in Lithuania, to Baltiysk (formerly Pillau) and to Saint Petersburg.

The island of Hiddensee, which also belongs to the county of Vorpommern-Rügen, is connected by a regular ferry service from Schaprode to Rügen, and is increasingly integrated into the clock-schedule timetable on the main island. In addition, there is a regular ship service from Stralsund, Wiek and Breege to Hiddensee. Tourist services include ferry connections from Lauterbach to Gager, and between Sassnitz, Binz, Sellin and Göhren. There are also round-trips mainly from Sassnitz, but also from Lohme, to the Königsstuhl. Pleasure steamers also ply between the resorts and Peenemünde on Usedom, where there is a connection to the Usedom Railway (UBB).

=== Ferries ===
Sassnitz–Neu Mukran is the international ferry terminal on Rügen, with ferry services to

- Trelleborg (Sweden, served by Stena Line),
- Rønne (Bornholm, Denmark, served by Bornholmslinjen),
- Klaipėda (Memel, Lithuania, served by DFDS Lisco),
- Baltiysk (Pillau, Kaliningrad Oblast, Russia, served by DFDS Lisco),
- Saint Petersburg (Russia, served by TransRussiaExpress)
- Ust-Luga (near Saint Petersburg, Russia; planned).

Sassnitz-Mukran is the largest railway ferry terminal in Germany and the only one in Europe where different tracks allow switching from standard gauge to broad gauge.

Local passenger ferries connect the piers of Sassnitz, Binz, Sellin and Göhren with the adjacent islands of Hiddensee, Vilm and Greifswalder Oie. Passenger and car ferries connect Rügen's centre of Muttland, to both Wittow in Rügen's north via the Wittow Ferry and to the mainland via the Glewitz Ferry (Glewitzer Fähre) between Stahlbrode near Greifswald and Glewitz on Rügen's Zudar peninsula.

=== Aviation ===
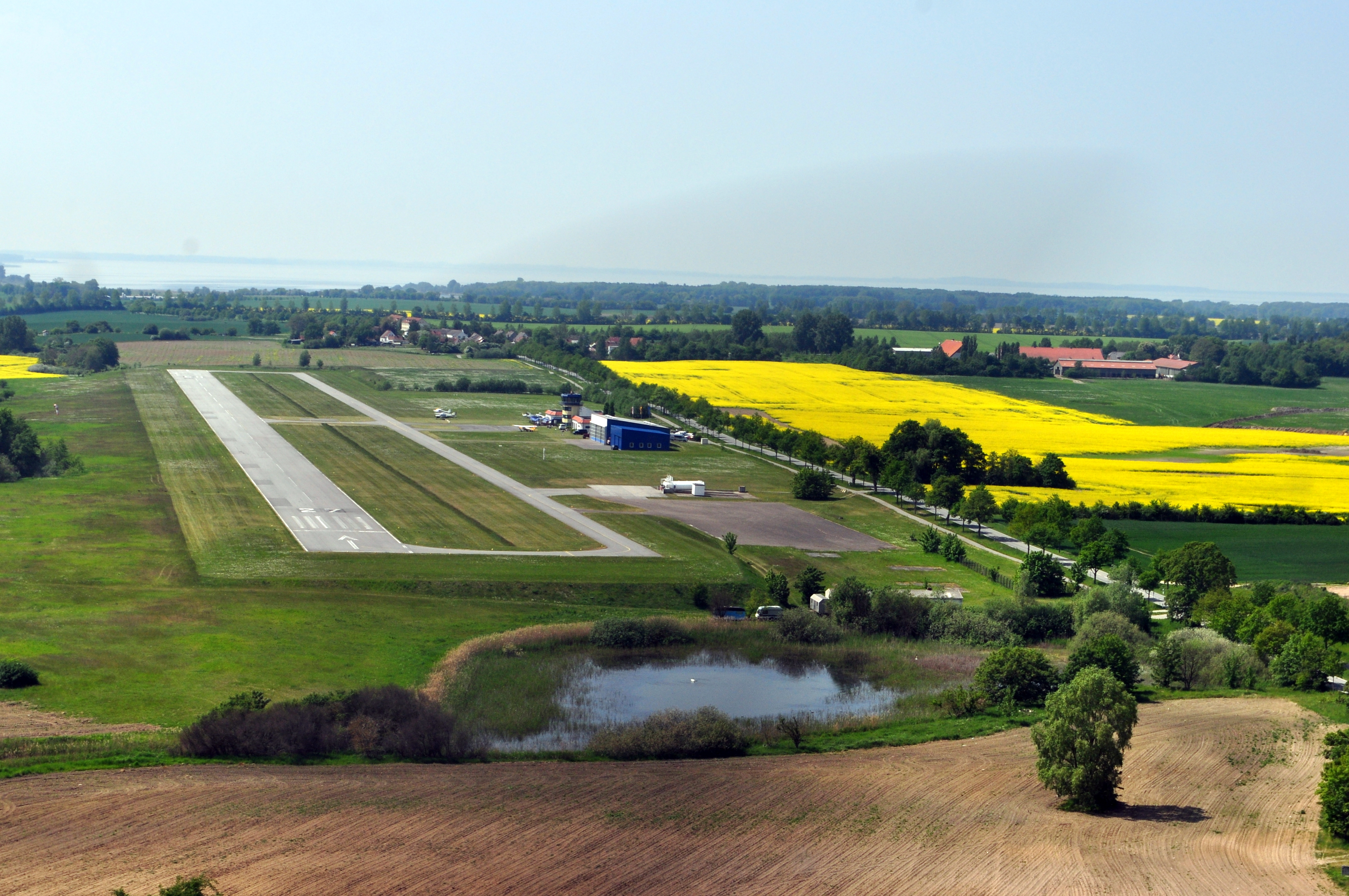
Runway of Rügen Airport at Bergen

Rügen Airport is located about 8 km (5.0 mi) from Bergen. After the Wende, the first sightseeing flights over the island were offered on the former agricultural airfield. In May 1993, the first tarmac runway was inaugurated. Since then, charter flights to Berlin, Hamburg and other cities in Europe have been available.

The Baltic Sea Airport Stralsund also offers flights to and from the region of Western Pomerania. The larger Rostock–Laage Airport offers regular international destinations.

== Notable people ==
Significant Rüganer:

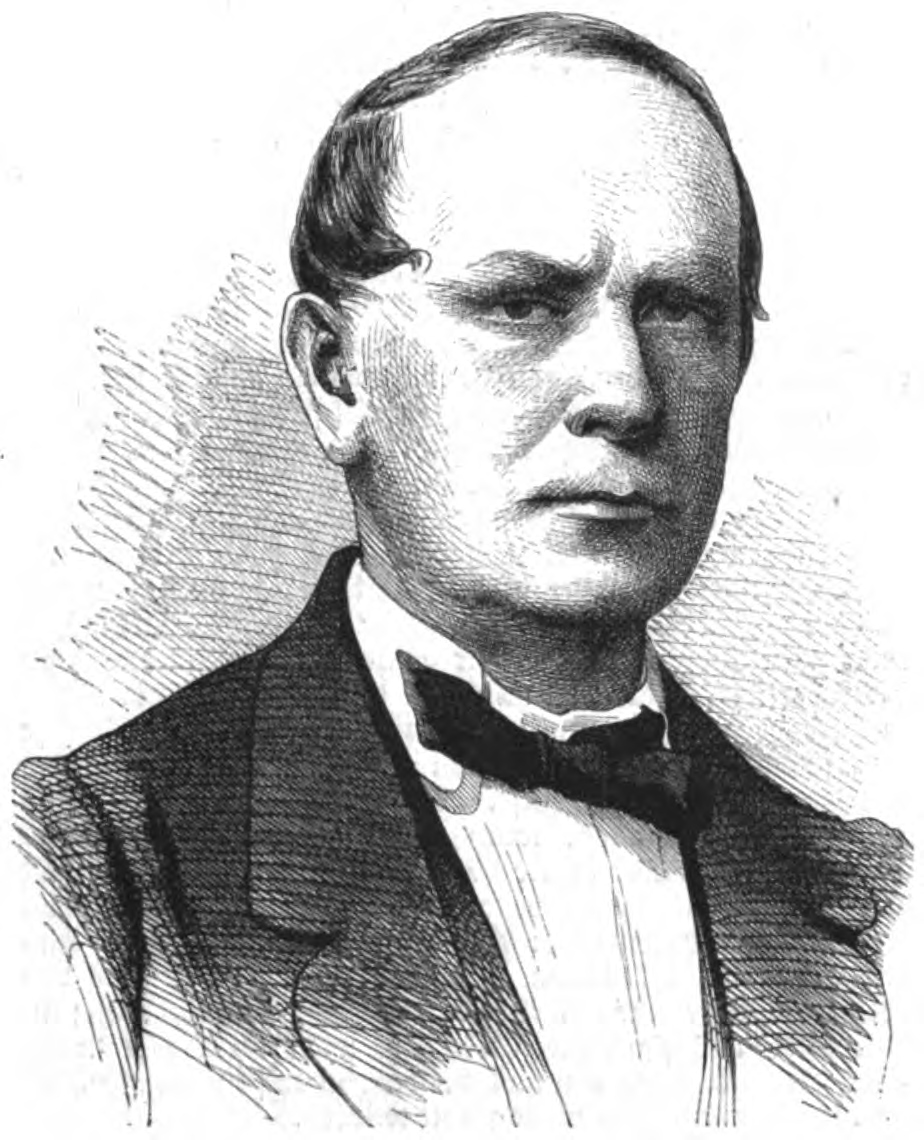
Karl Schwarz, 1865

- Preben von Ahnen (1606–1675) a German-born Norwegian civil servant and landowner.
- Count Baltzar Bogislaus von Platen (1766–1829) a Swedish naval officer and statesman.
- Ernst Moritz Arndt (1769–1860), German writer and deputy.
- Wilhelm Malte I Prince of Putbus (1783–1854), under his rule there was much construction work in the classical style
- Arnold Ruge (1802–1880) a philosopher and political writer.
- Karl Schwarz (1812–1885) a Protestant theologian.
- Theodor Billroth (1829–1894), one of the greatest surgeons of the 19th century.
- Berthold Delbrück (1842–1922), German linguist
- Anna Dabis (1847–1927) a sculptor who spent much of her career in Britain.
- Hans Delbrück (1848–1929), German historian and politician.
- Franziska Tiburtius (1843–1927), German doctor and campaigner for women's studies
- Hans Langsdorff (1894–1939), German naval officer and captain of the Armoured Cruiser Admiral Graf Spee
- Meinhard Nehmer (born 1941), East German bobsledder, Olympic and World Champion
- Christian Schwochow (born 1978) a German film director.

=== Individuals associated with the island ===
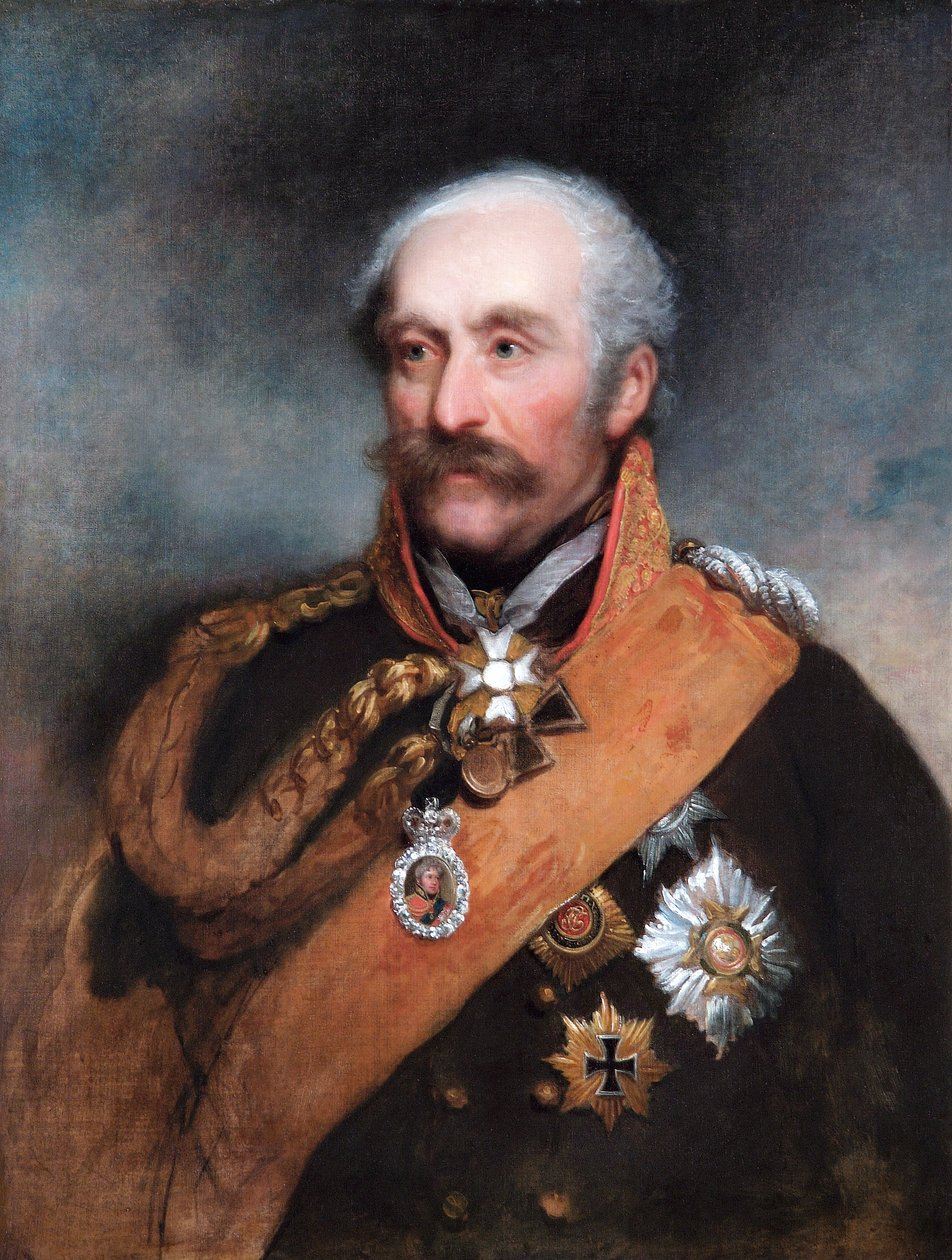
Gebhard Leberecht von Blücher

- Gebhard Leberecht von Blücher, Prince Wahlstatt (1742–1819), Prussian Field Marshal, spent his youth on the Venz estate.
- Caspar David Friedrich (1774–1840), painter, stayed several times on visits by relatives of Pomerania and was inspired mainly by the chalk cliffs
- Ludwig Gotthard Kosegarten (1758–1818), theologian, pastor, professor and poet, pastor of the parish Altenkirchen at Rügen
- Joachim Nicolas Eggert (1779–1813), composer and musical director, member of the Royal Swedish Musical Academy
- Elizabeth von Arnim (1866-1941), wrote of a visit to the island in The Adventures of Elizabeth in Rugen (1904).
- Maximilian Kaller (1880–1947), Bishop of Warmia in Prussia, began his first pastorate as mission pastor of St. Boniface parish at Rügen
- Angela Merkel (born 1954), German Chancellor (CDU), represented the constituency of Vorpommern-Rügen – Vorpommern-Greifswald I between 1990 and 2021; she therefore represented the island of Rügen in the Bundestag.

== See also ==
- Åland
- Bornholm
- Buyan
- Gotland, Öland
- List of islands in the Baltic Sea
- List of churches on Rügen
- Prora
- Saaremaa, Hiiumaa
- Usedom
