= Rappin =

- Municipality
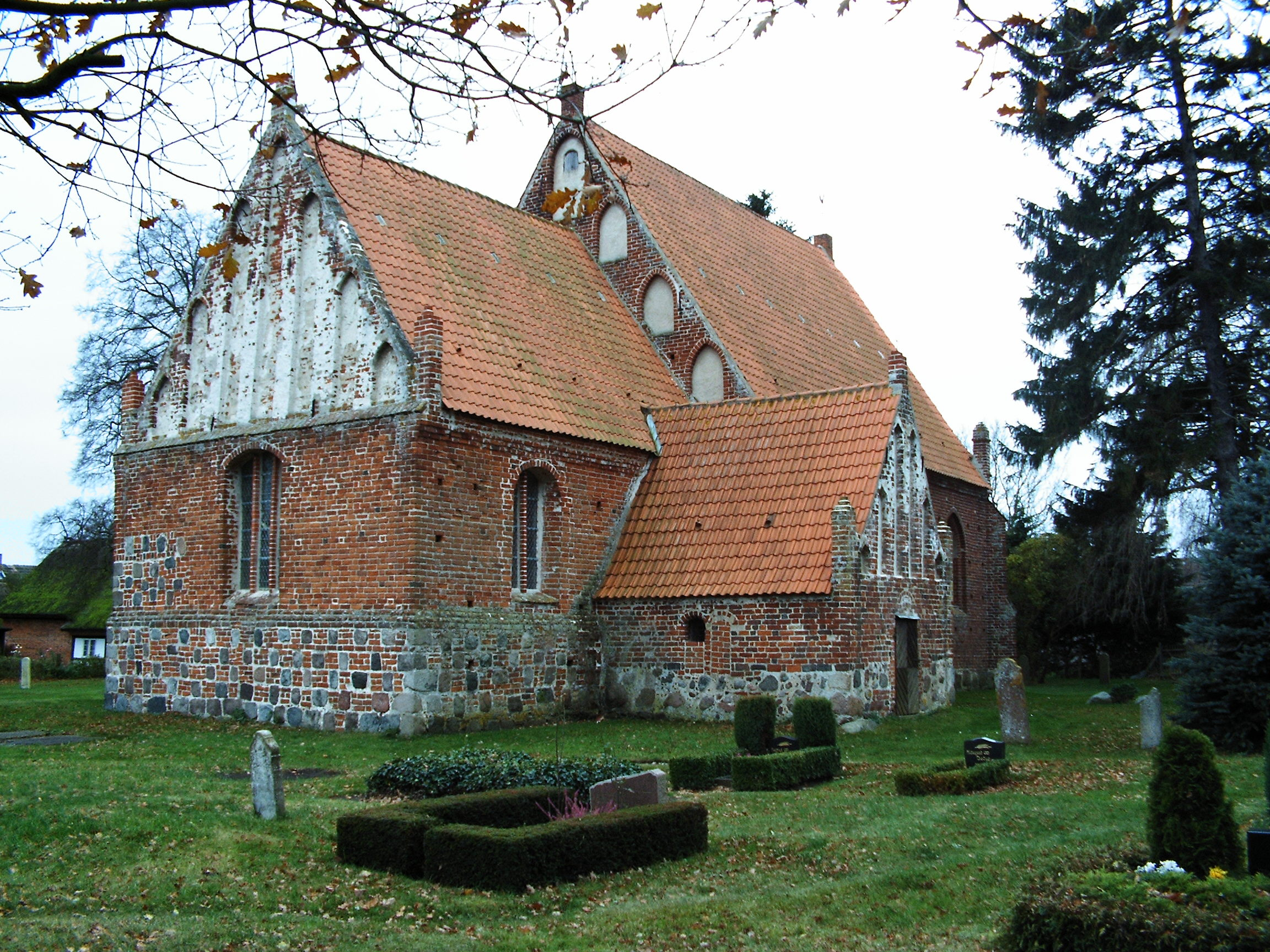
- Rappin church

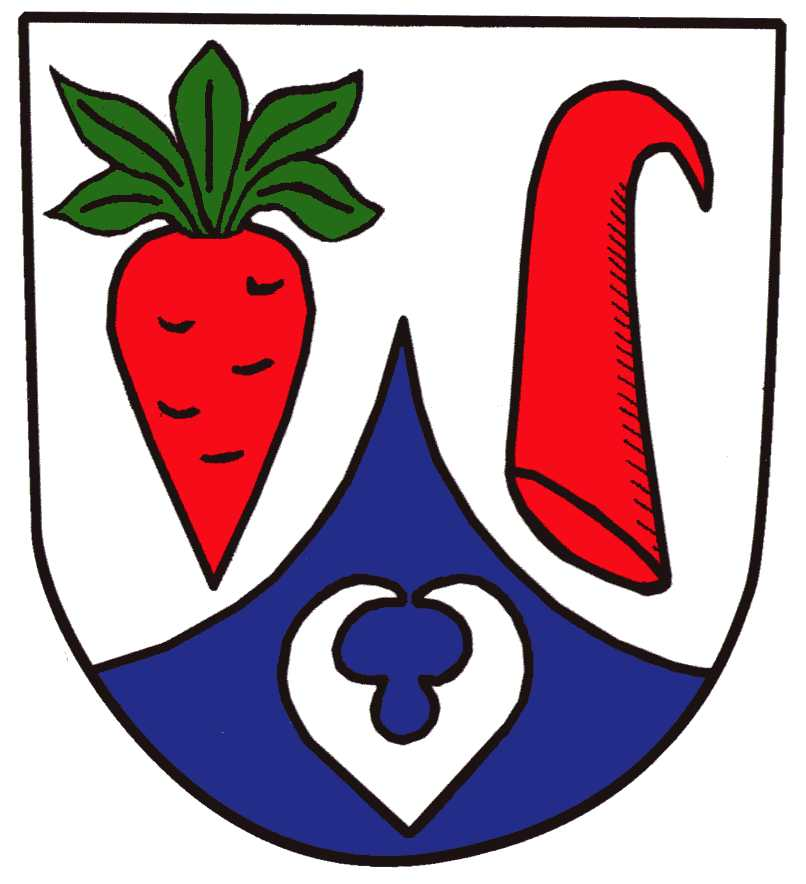
- Coat of arms

- Location of Rappin within Vorpommern-Rügen district
- Interactive map of Rappin
- Location within Germany Location within Mecklenburg-Vorpommern
- Coordinates: 54°30′N 13°22′E
- Country: Germany
- State: Mecklenburg-Vorpommern
- District: Vorpommern-Rügen
- Municipal assoc.: Bergen auf Rügen

Government
  - Mayor: Andre Wittkamp

Area
  - Total: 29.07 km^{2} (11.22 sq mi)
- Elevation: 7 m (23 ft)

Population (2025-12-31)
  - Total: 286
  - Density: 9.84/km^{2} (25.5/sq mi)
- Time zone: UTC+01:00 (CET)
  - Summer (DST): UTC+02:00 (CEST)
- Postal codes: 18528
- Dialling codes: 03838
- Vehicle registration: RÜG
- Website: www.amt-bergen-auf-ruegen.de

Rappin is a municipality in the Vorpommern-Rügen district, in Mecklenburg-Vorpommern, Germany, Located on the Rugen island.
