= Patzig =

- Municipality
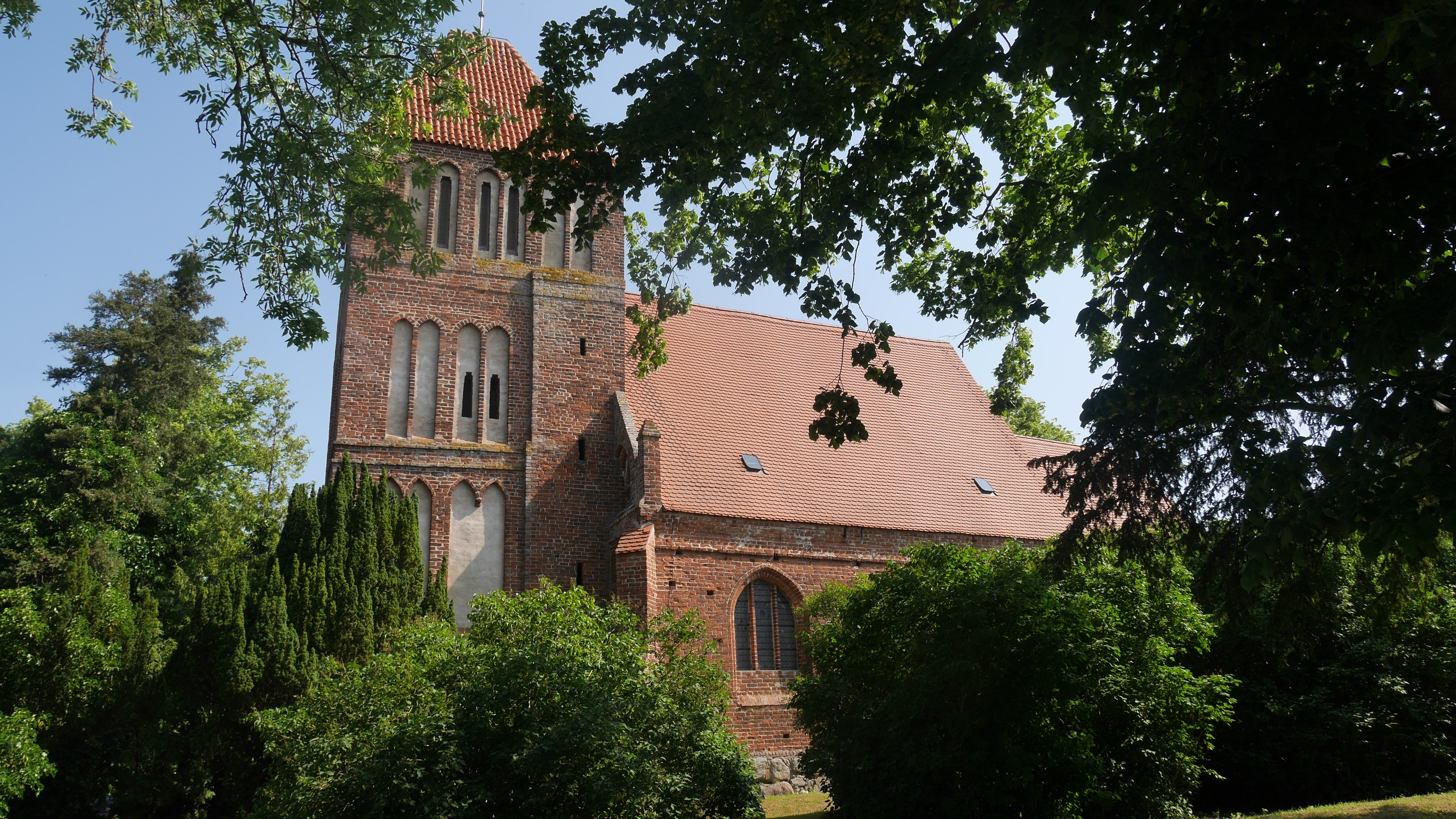
- Medieval church in Patzig

- Location of Patzig within Vorpommern-Rügen district
- Interactive map of Patzig
- Location within Germany Location within Mecklenburg-Vorpommern
- Coordinates: 54°28′N 13°24′E
- Country: Germany
- State: Mecklenburg-Vorpommern
- District: Vorpommern-Rügen
- Municipal assoc.: Bergen auf Rügen

Government
  - Mayor: Irit Vollbrecht

Area
  - Total: 8.05 km^{2} (3.11 sq mi)
- Elevation: 48 m (157 ft)

Population (2025-12-31)
  - Total: 410
  - Density: 51/km^{2} (130/sq mi)
- Time zone: UTC+01:00 (CET)
  - Summer (DST): UTC+02:00 (CEST)
- Postal codes: 18528
- Dialling codes: 03838
- Vehicle registration: RÜG
- Website: www.amt-bergen-auf-ruegen.de

Patzig is a municipality, located on the island of Rügen, in the Vorpommern-Rügen district, in Mecklenburg-Vorpommern, Germany.
