= Bergen auf Rügen (Amt) =

- Amt
- Location of Bergen auf Rügen within Vorpommern-Rügen district
- Interactive map of Bergen auf Rügen
- Location within Germany Location within Mecklenburg-Vorpommern
- Coordinates: 54°22′N 13°23′E
- Country: Germany
- State: Mecklenburg-Vorpommern
- District: Vorpommern-Rügen
- Seat: Bergen auf Rügen
- Subdivisions: 11 municipalities

Area
  - Total: 303.65 km^{2} (117.24 sq mi)

Population (2025-12-31)
  - Total: 20,084
  - Density: 66.142/km^{2} (171.31/sq mi)
- Time zone: UTC+01:00 (CET)
  - Summer (DST): UTC+02:00 (CEST)
- Website: www.amt-altenpleen.de

Bergen auf Rügen is an Amt in the district of Vorpommern-Rügen in Mecklenburg-Vorpommern, Germany. The seat of the Amt is in Bergen auf Rügen. It was established on 1 January 2005 as a combination of the Amt Bergen/Land, the Amt Garz and the city of Bergen auf Rügen, which previously was not part of an Amt.

The Amt Bergen auf Rügen consists of the following municipalities:

1. Bergen auf Rügen
2. Buschvitz
3. Garz/Rügen
4. Gustow
5. Lietzow
6. Parchtitz
7. Patzig
8. Poseritz
9. Ralswiek
10. Rappin
11. Sehlen
