= Sehlen =

- Municipality
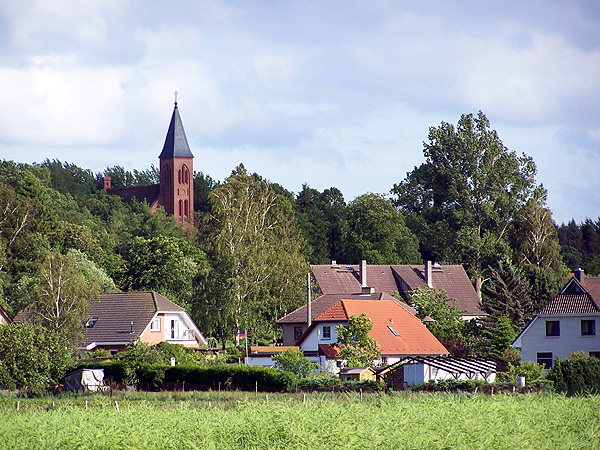
- View of Sehlen with its church

- Location of Sehlen within Vorpommern-Rügen district
- Interactive map of Sehlen
- Location within Germany Location within Mecklenburg-Vorpommern
- Coordinates: 54°23′N 13°23′E
- Country: Germany
- State: Mecklenburg-Vorpommern
- District: Vorpommern-Rügen
- Municipal assoc.: Bergen auf Rügen

Government
  - Mayor: Manfred Keller

Area
  - Total: 20.6 km^{2} (8.0 sq mi)
- Elevation: 42 m (138 ft)

Population (2025-12-31)
  - Total: 891
  - Density: 43.3/km^{2} (112/sq mi)
- Time zone: UTC+01:00 (CET)
  - Summer (DST): UTC+02:00 (CEST)
- Postal codes: 18528
- Dialling codes: 03838
- Vehicle registration: RÜG
- Website: www.amt-bergen-auf-ruegen.de

Sehlen (German pronunciation: [ˈzeːlən]) is a municipality in the Vorpommern-Rügen district, in Mecklenburg-Vorpommern, Germany. As of 2022, there population count in Sehlen is 895.

The municipality of Sehlen is located five kilometers south of Bergen in central Muttland.
