= Buschvitz =

- Municipality
- Location of Buschvitz within Vorpommern-Rügen district
- Interactive map of Buschvitz
- Location within Germany Location within Mecklenburg-Vorpommern
- Coordinates: 54°26′00″N 13°28′28″E
- Country: Germany
- State: Mecklenburg-Vorpommern
- District: Vorpommern-Rügen
- Municipal assoc.: Bergen auf Rügen

Government
  - Mayor: Stine Winter

Area
  - Total: 10.14 km^{2} (3.92 sq mi)
- Elevation: 8 m (26 ft)

Population (2025-12-31)
  - Total: 229
  - Density: 22.6/km^{2} (58.5/sq mi)
- Time zone: UTC+01:00 (CET)
  - Summer (DST): UTC+02:00 (CEST)
- Postal codes: 18528
- Dialling codes: 03838
- Vehicle registration: RÜG
- Website: www.amt-bergen-auf-ruegen.de

Buschvitz is a municipality in the Vorpommern-Rügen district, in Mecklenburg-Vorpommern, Germany.
