= Gustow =

- Municipality
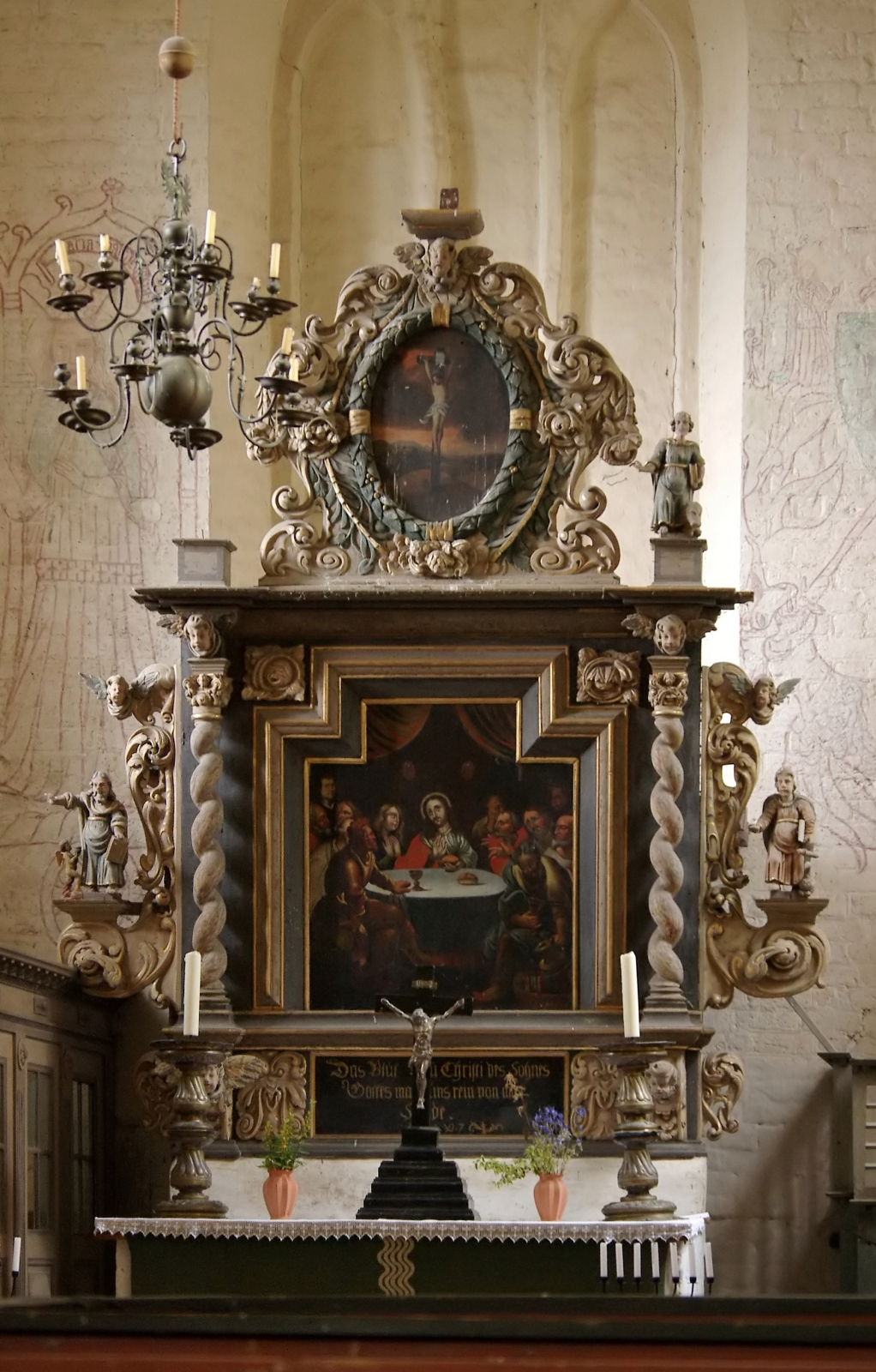
- Inside the church of Gustow

- Location of Gustow within Vorpommern-Rügen district
- Interactive map of Gustow
- Location within Germany Location within Mecklenburg-Vorpommern
- Coordinates: 54°17′N 13°13′E
- Country: Germany
- State: Mecklenburg-Vorpommern
- District: Vorpommern-Rügen
- Municipal assoc.: Bergen auf Rügen

Government
  - Mayor: Bernhard Kirchner

Area
  - Total: 28.44 km^{2} (10.98 sq mi)
- Elevation: 15 m (49 ft)

Population (2025-12-31)
  - Total: 566
  - Density: 19.9/km^{2} (51.5/sq mi)
- Time zone: UTC+01:00 (CET)
  - Summer (DST): UTC+02:00 (CEST)
- Postal codes: 18574
- Dialling codes: 038307
- Vehicle registration: RÜG

Gustow is a municipality in the Vorpommern-Rügen district, in Mecklenburg-Vorpommern, Germany.

== History ==
The place name comes from the Slavic Gostov and means "place of Gost". Until the 18th century the farm and village belonged to von den Ostens at Plüggentin. In 1324 Vitslav III sold a widow from Barnekow a pension, which fell in 1330 to Bergen auf Rügen Abbey.

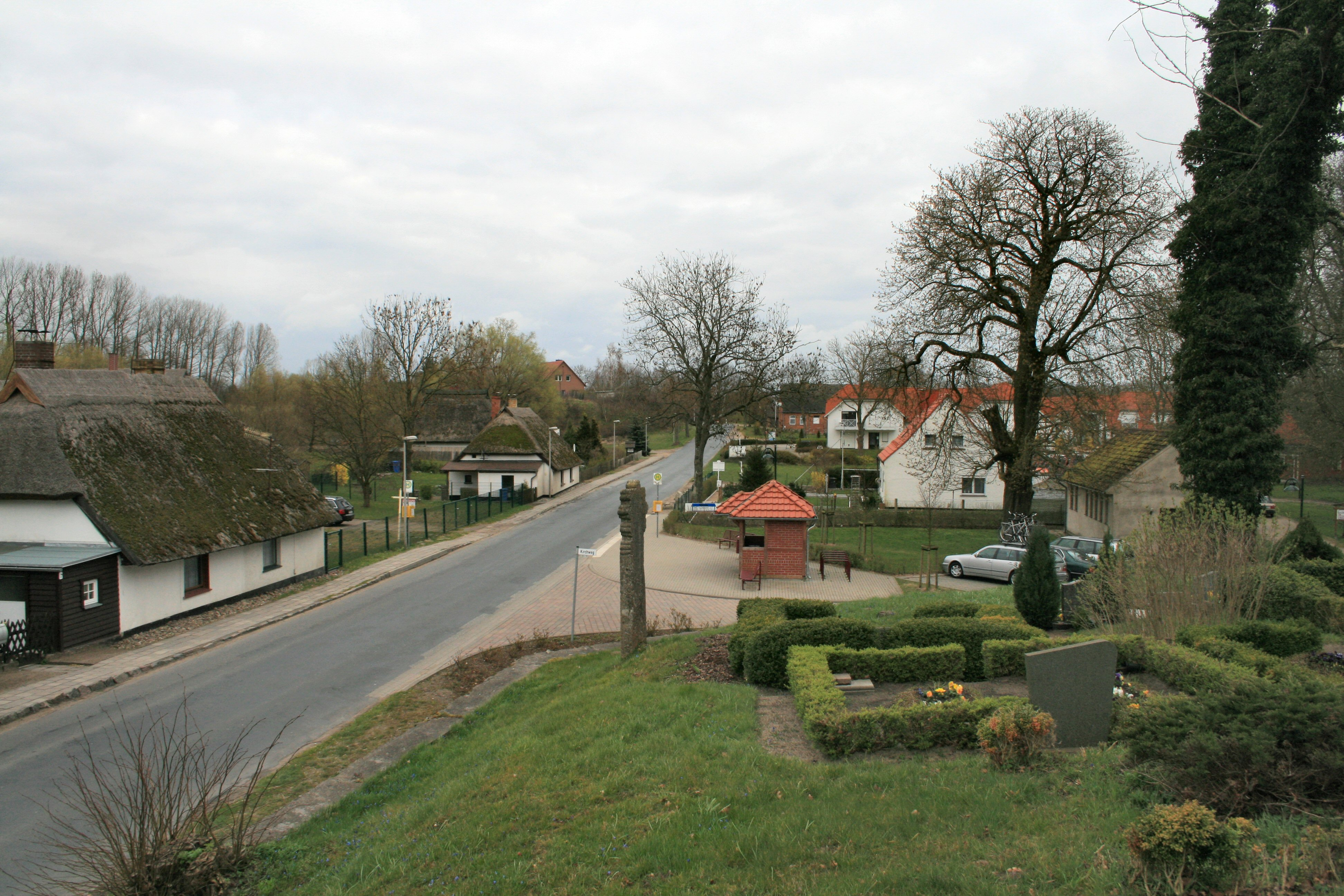
Partial view of Gustow with the Sühnestein by the churchyard wall
