= Breege =

- Municipality
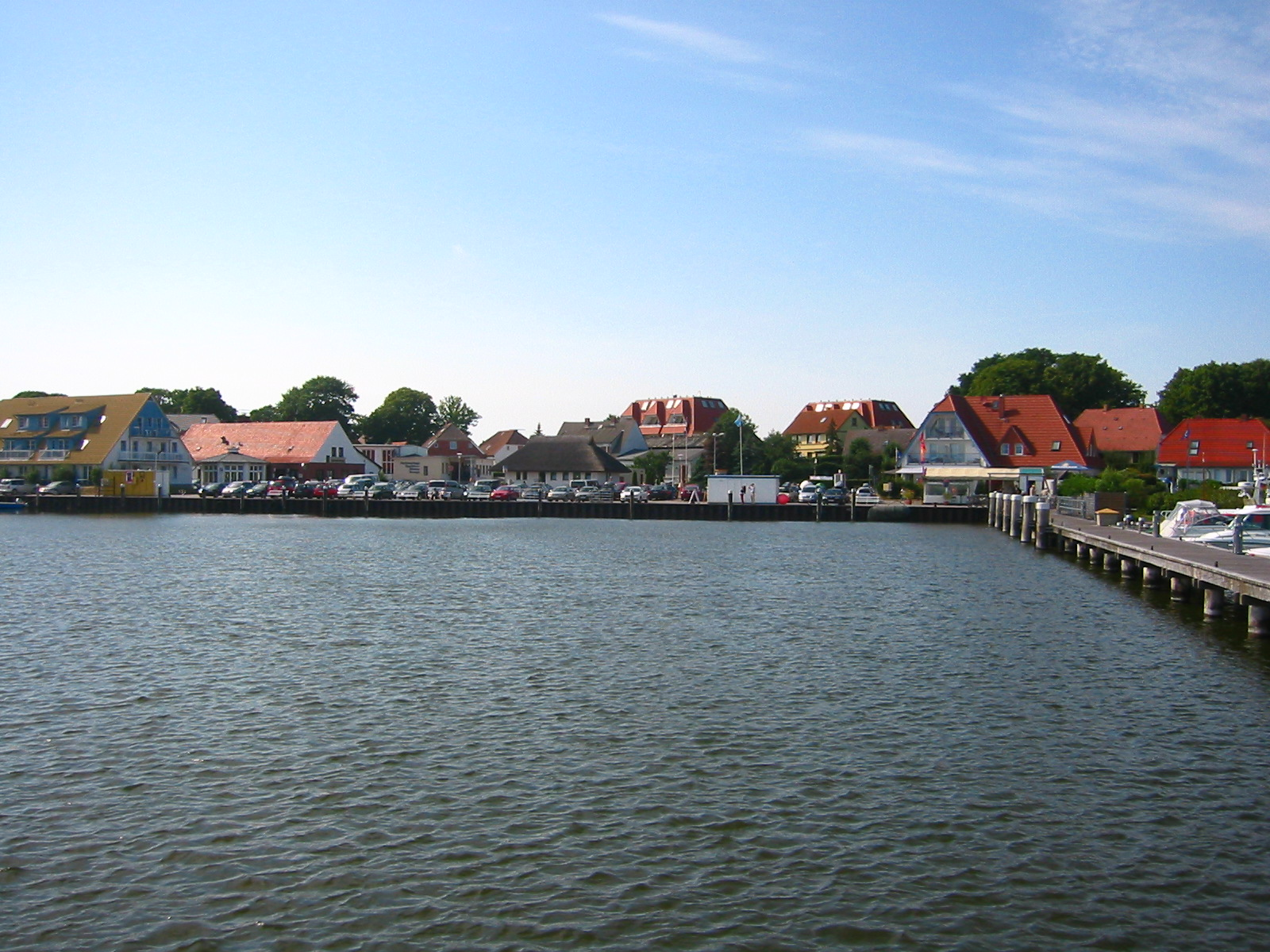
- View from harbour

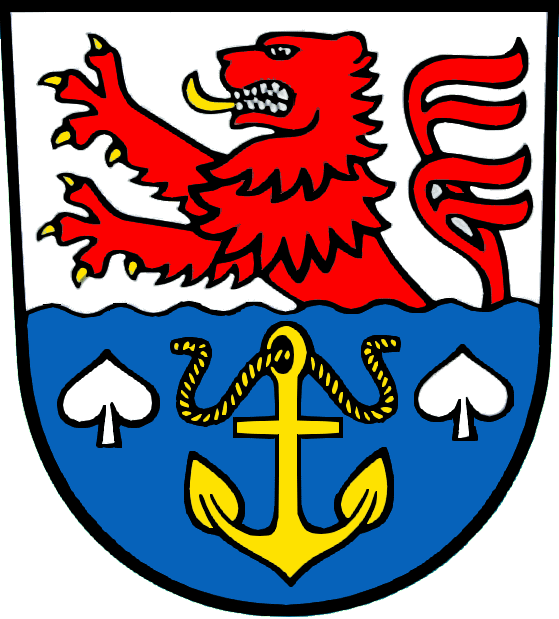
- Coat of arms

- Location of Breege within Vorpommern-Rügen district
- Interactive map of Breege
- Location within Germany Location within Mecklenburg-Vorpommern
- Coordinates: 54°36′44″N 13°21′16″E
- Country: Germany
- State: Mecklenburg-Vorpommern
- District: Vorpommern-Rügen
- Municipal assoc.: Nord-Rügen

Government
  - Mayor: Berndt Kuntze

Area
  - Total: 15.99 km^{2} (6.17 sq mi)
- Elevation: 2 m (6.6 ft)

Population (2025-12-31)
  - Total: 583
  - Density: 36.5/km^{2} (94.4/sq mi)
- Time zone: UTC+01:00 (CET)
  - Summer (DST): UTC+02:00 (CEST)
- Postal codes: 18556
- Dialling codes: 038391
- Vehicle registration: RÜG
- Website: www.breege.de

Breege is a municipality in the Vorpommern-Rügen district, in Mecklenburg-Vorpommern, Germany. The municipality consists of the villages Breege, Juliusruh, Kammin, Lobkevitz and Schmantevitz.
