= Dranske =

- Municipality
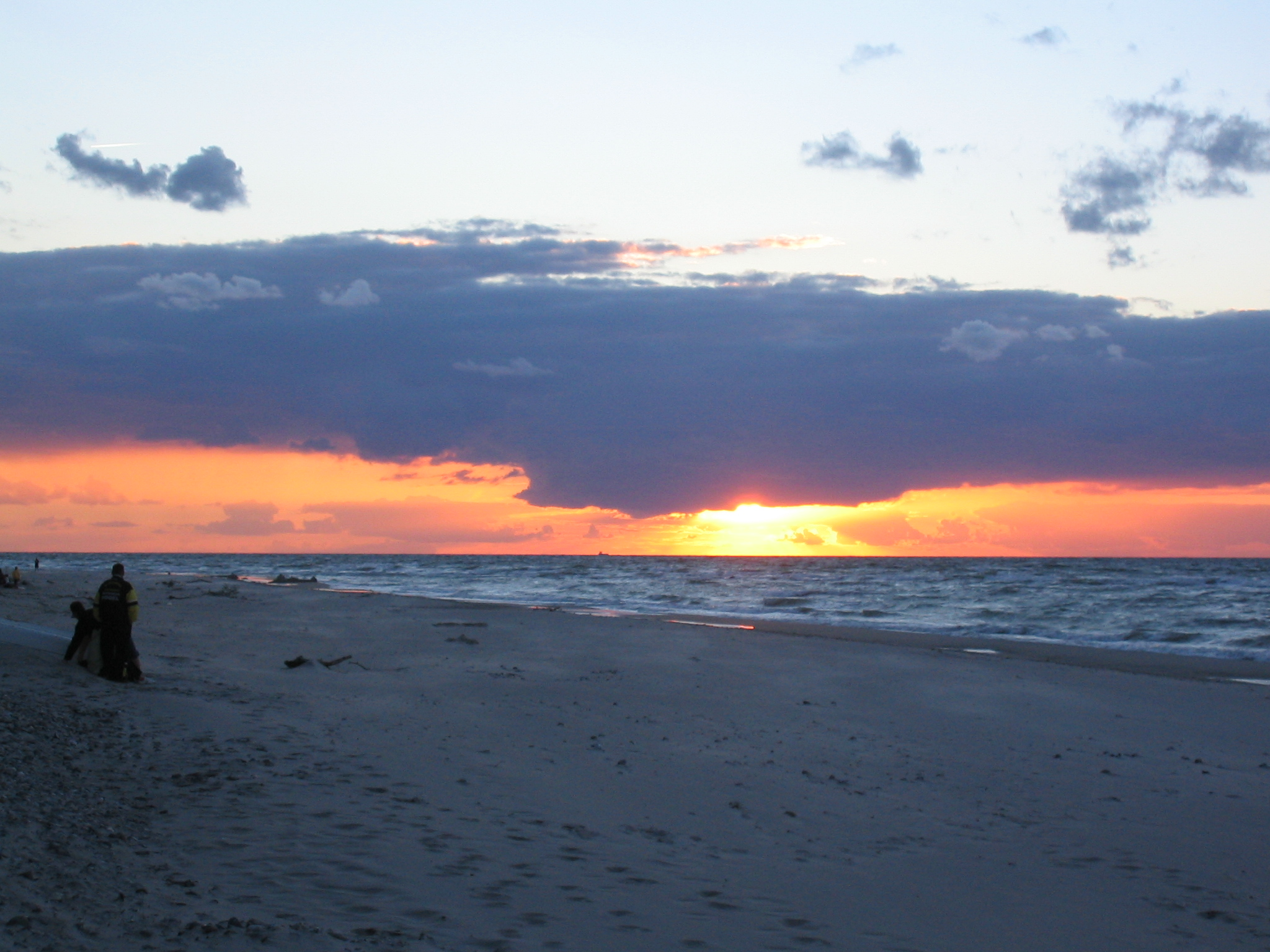
- Sunset at Dranske beach

- Coat of arms

- Location of Dranske within Vorpommern-Rügen district
- Interactive map of Dranske
- Location within Germany Location within Mecklenburg-Vorpommern
- Coordinates: 54°37′51″N 13°13′48″E
- Country: Germany
- State: Mecklenburg-Vorpommern
- District: Vorpommern-Rügen
- Municipal assoc.: Nord-Rügen

Government
  - Mayor: Michael Heese

Area
  - Total: 20.73 km^{2} (8.00 sq mi)
- Elevation: 2 m (6.6 ft)

Population (2025-12-31)
  - Total: 1,103
  - Density: 53.21/km^{2} (137.8/sq mi)
- Time zone: UTC+01:00 (CET)
  - Summer (DST): UTC+02:00 (CEST)
- Postal codes: 18556
- Dialling codes: 038391
- Vehicle registration: RÜG
- Website: www.gemeinde-dranske.de

Dranske is a municipality in the Vorpommern-Rügen district, in Mecklenburg-Vorpommern, Germany.

Dranske village includes a sailing school, a ceramic workshop, and a museum. In 1999 the Naval History and Local History Museum was established at the Drankse post office; it was later moved to the old school.

== See also ==
- Bug (Rügen)
