= Wiek, Rügen =

Wiek
- Municipality
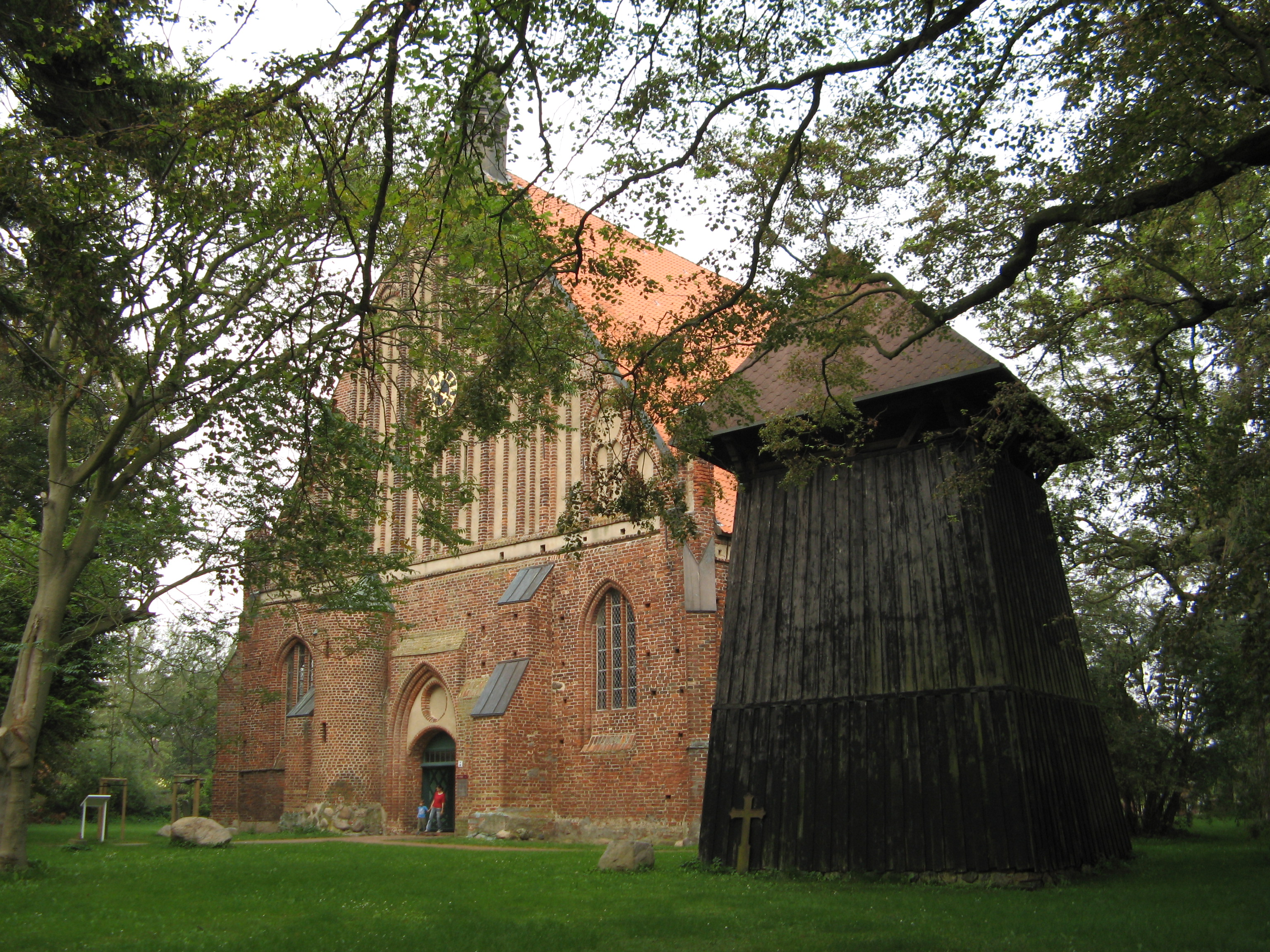
- St. George's Church in Wiek

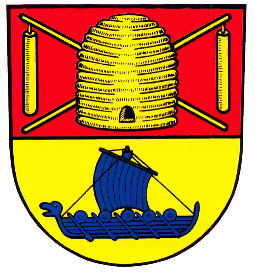
- Coat of arms

- Location of Wiek within Vorpommern-Rügen district
- Interactive map of Wiek
- Location within Germany Location within Mecklenburg-Vorpommern
- Coordinates: 54°37′20″N 13°17′21″E
- Country: Germany
- State: Mecklenburg-Vorpommern
- District: Vorpommern-Rügen
- Municipal assoc.: Nord-Rügen

Government
  - Mayor: Petra Harder (CDU)

Area
  - Total: 25.53 km^{2} (9.86 sq mi)
- Elevation: 2 m (6.6 ft)

Population (2025-12-31)
  - Total: 967
  - Density: 37.9/km^{2} (98.1/sq mi)
- Time zone: UTC+01:00 (CET)
  - Summer (DST): UTC+02:00 (CEST)
- Postal codes: 18556
- Dialling codes: 038391
- Vehicle registration: RÜG
- Website: www.wiek-ruegen.de

Wiek (German pronunciation: [viːk]) is a municipality in the Vorpommern-Rügen district, in Mecklenburg-Vorpommern, Germany.

The body of the well-known American Brigadier General Nathan Bedford Forrest III, killed while on an air raid on Kiel in 1943, was buried at Wiek by the German authorities. It laid there until 1947 when the body was repatriated to the United States.
