= Kluis =

- Municipality
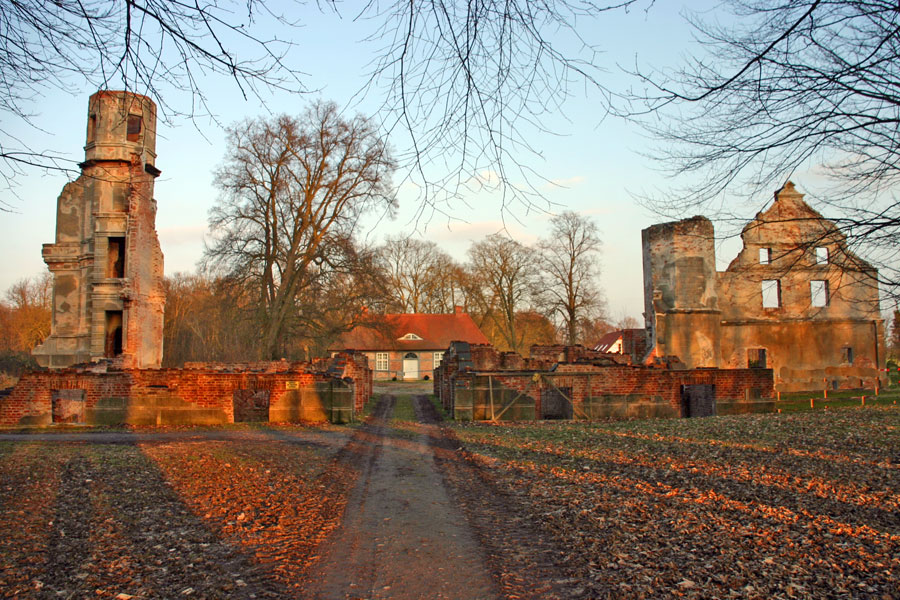
- Schlossruine Pansevitz in Kluis

- Coat of arms

- Location of Kluis within Vorpommern-Rügen district
- Interactive map of Kluis
- Location within Germany Location within Mecklenburg-Vorpommern
- Coordinates: 54°28′N 13°17′E
- Country: Germany
- State: Mecklenburg-Vorpommern
- District: Vorpommern-Rügen
- Municipal assoc.: West-Rügen

Government
  - Mayor: Eckhard Koch

Area
  - Total: 21.40 km^{2} (8.26 sq mi)
- Elevation: 13 m (43 ft)

Population (2025-12-31)
  - Total: 378
  - Density: 17.7/km^{2} (45.7/sq mi)
- Time zone: UTC+01:00 (CET)
  - Summer (DST): UTC+02:00 (CEST)
- Postal codes: 18569
- Dialling codes: 03838, 038305, 038309
- Vehicle registration: RÜG

Kluis is a municipality in the Vorpommern-Rügen district, in Mecklenburg-Vorpommern, Germany.
