= Ralswiek =

- Municipality
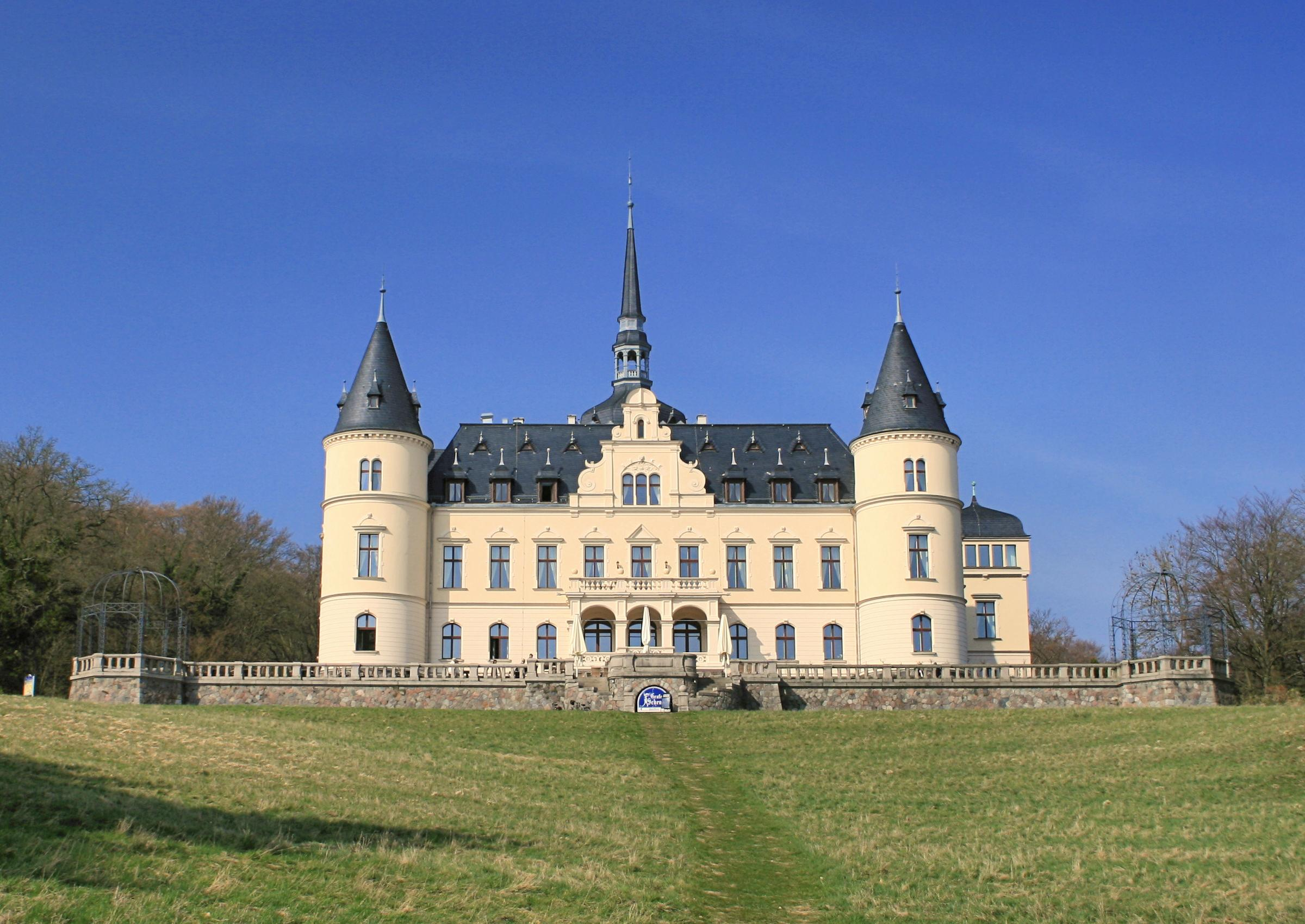
- Ralswiek Castle

- Coat of arms

- Location of Ralswiek within Vorpommern-Rügen district
- Interactive map of Ralswiek
- Location within Germany Location within Mecklenburg-Vorpommern
- Coordinates: 54°28′N 13°27′E
- Country: Germany
- State: Mecklenburg-Vorpommern
- District: Vorpommern-Rügen
- Municipal assoc.: Bergen auf Rügen

Government
  - Mayor: Herbert Knüppel

Area
  - Total: 16.53 km^{2} (6.38 sq mi)
- Elevation: 5 m (16 ft)

Population (2025-12-31)
  - Total: 251
  - Density: 15.2/km^{2} (39.3/sq mi)
- Time zone: UTC+01:00 (CET)
  - Summer (DST): UTC+02:00 (CEST)
- Postal codes: 18528
- Dialling codes: 03838
- Vehicle registration: RÜG
- Website: www.amt-bergen-auf-ruegen.de

Ralswiek is a municipality in the Vorpommern-Rügen district, in Mecklenburg-Vorpommern, Germany.
