= Lietzow =

- Municipality
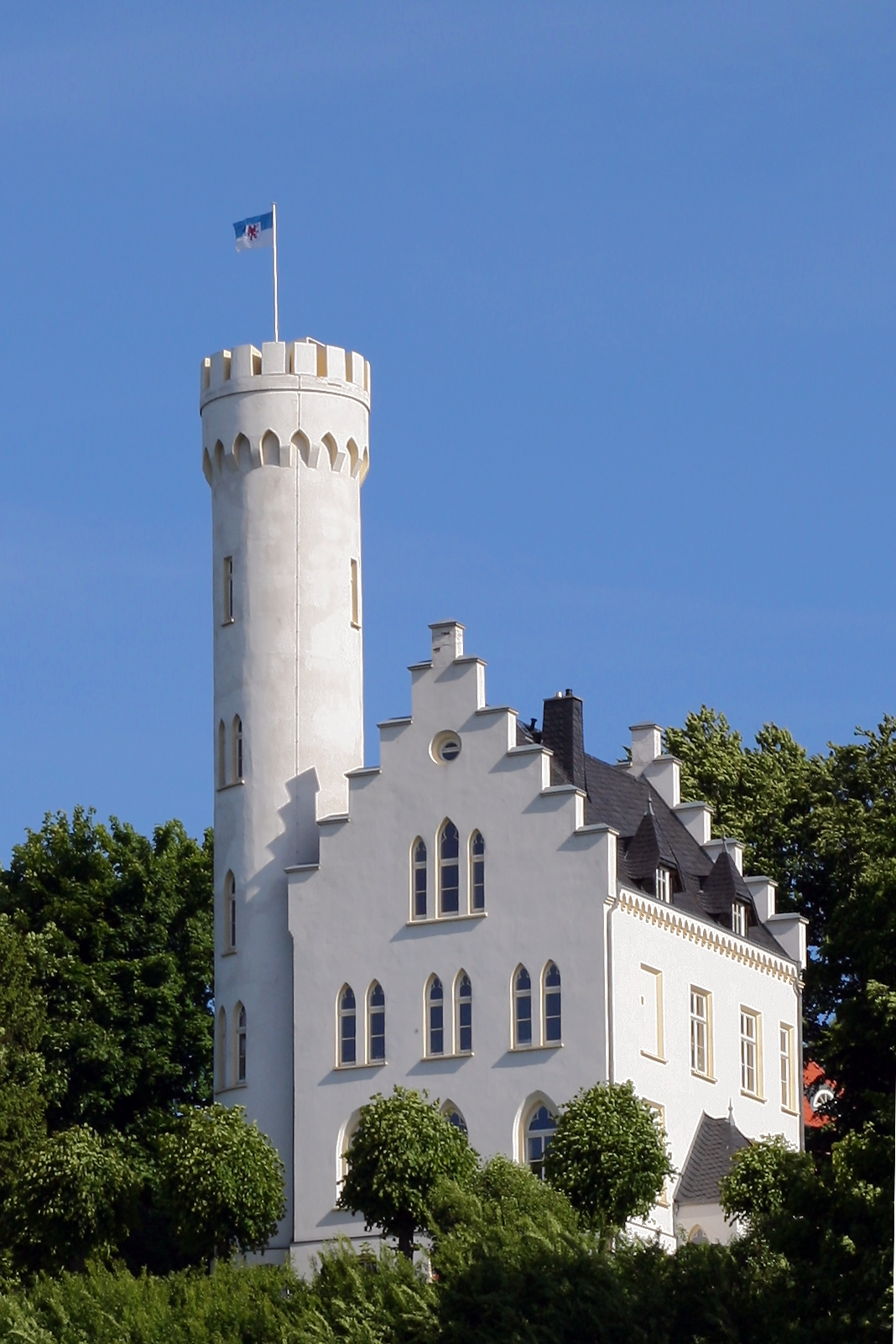
- Castle of Lietzow

- Location of Lietzow within Vorpommern-Rügen district
- Interactive map of Lietzow
- Location within Germany Location within Mecklenburg-Vorpommern
- Coordinates: 54°29′N 13°31′E
- Country: Germany
- State: Mecklenburg-Vorpommern
- District: Vorpommern-Rügen
- Municipal assoc.: Bergen auf Rügen

Government
  - Mayor: Jürgen Böhnig

Area
  - Total: 8.39 km^{2} (3.24 sq mi)
- Elevation: 5 m (16 ft)

Population (2025-12-31)
  - Total: 225
  - Density: 26.8/km^{2} (69.5/sq mi)
- Time zone: UTC+01:00 (CET)
  - Summer (DST): UTC+02:00 (CEST)
- Postal codes: 18528
- Dialling codes: 038302, 038392
- Vehicle registration: RÜG
- Website: www.amt-bergen-auf-ruegen.de

Lietzow is a municipality in the Vorpommern-Rügen district, in Mecklenburg-Vorpommern, Germany.
