= North Rügen Bodden =

Lagoons in Germany

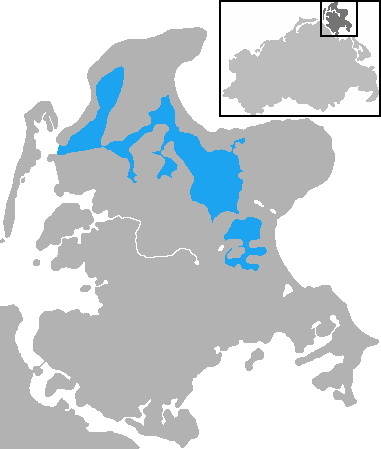
North Rügen Bodden

The North Rügen Bodden (German: Nordrügener Bodden or Rügenschen Innenboddenkette) are a string of West Pomeranian lagoons, known as bodden, on the Baltic Sea coast of northeastern Germany. They are almost entirely surrounded by the island of Rügen and its peninsulas. For example, in the north they are bounded by the Bug, the peninsulas of Wittow and Jasmund and the spit of Schaabe. To the south is the Muttland, the main body of Rügen Island. Amongst the highest points in the surrounding ridges of terminal moraine are the Rugard (118 m above NN) near Bergen, the Tempelberg (50 m) near Bobbin, the Hoch Hilgor (43 m) near Neuenkirchen, the Banzelvitz Hills (45 m) near Rappin and the Mühlenberg (25 m) between Buschvitz and Stedar.

To the west the chain of bodden has a narrow link to the Baltic in the Vitter Bodden. Through this narrow strait their waters mix with the salty seawater, so that the waters to the east are always brackish. The string of bodden is heavily divided. The shores of the North Rügen Bodden alternate between higher belts of terminal moraine and lower, tongue-like basins. Between the villages of Ralswiek and Liezow, on the embankment between the Großer and Kleiner Jasmunder Bodden, the moraines on either side approach to within 1 km of one another. Today the Kleiner Jasmunder Bodden is only linked with the rest of the bodden by a small canal near Lietzow.

The individual elements of the North Rügen Bodden chain comprise the:

- Wieker Bodden
- Rassower Strom
- Großer Jasmunder Bodden:
  - Großer Jasmunder Bodden
  - Breetzer Bodden
  - Neuendorfer Wiek
  - Breeger Bodden
  - Lebbiner Bodden
  - Tetzitzer See
  - Mittelsee
  - Spykerscher See
- Kleiner Jasmunder Bodden

(listed from west to east; not mentioned here are several smaller waterbodies)

== See also ==
- West Rügen Bodden
- Darss-Zingst Bodden Chain
