= Wittow Ferry =

Coordinates: 54°33′28.2″N 13°14′49.9″E

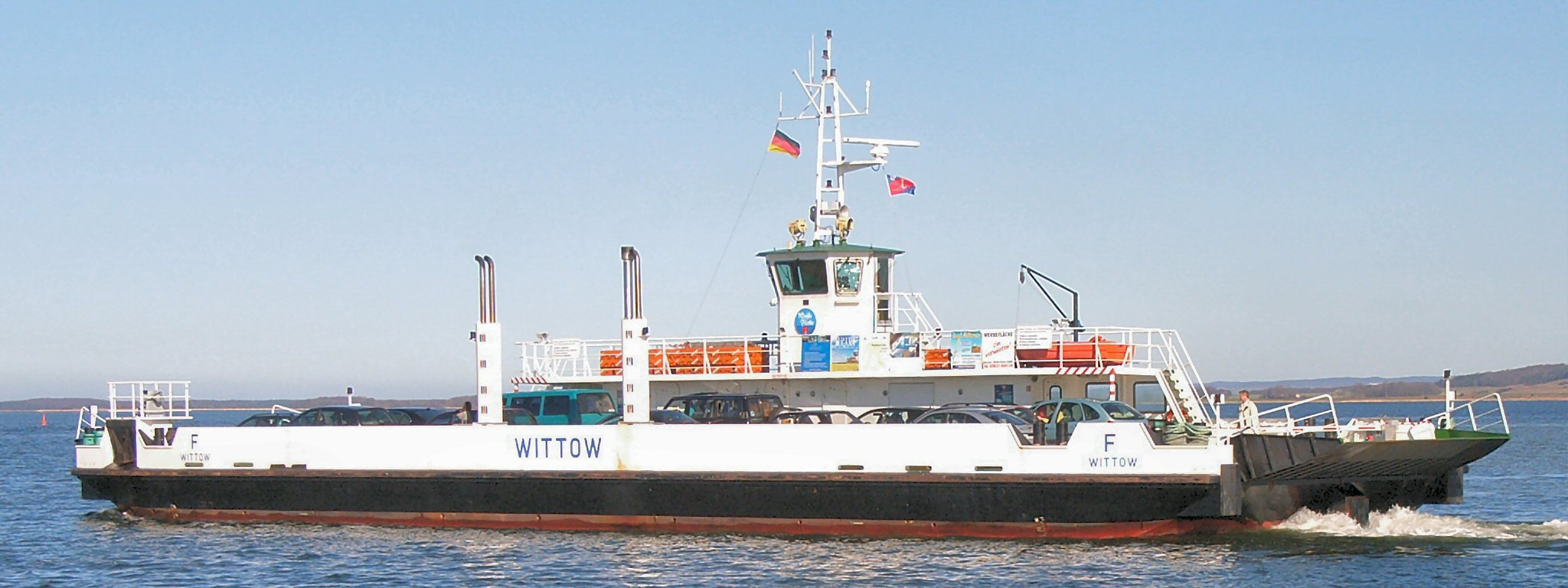
The new ferry boat, Wittow, built in 1996

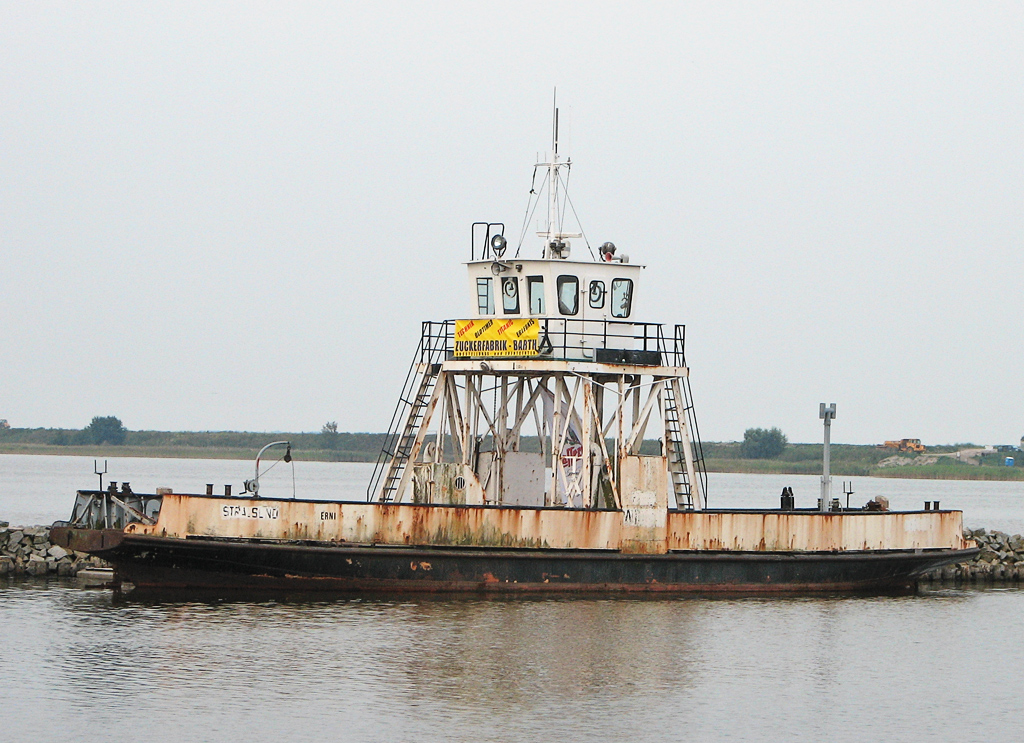
The old ferry boat, Wittow, in Barth Harbour in September 2005

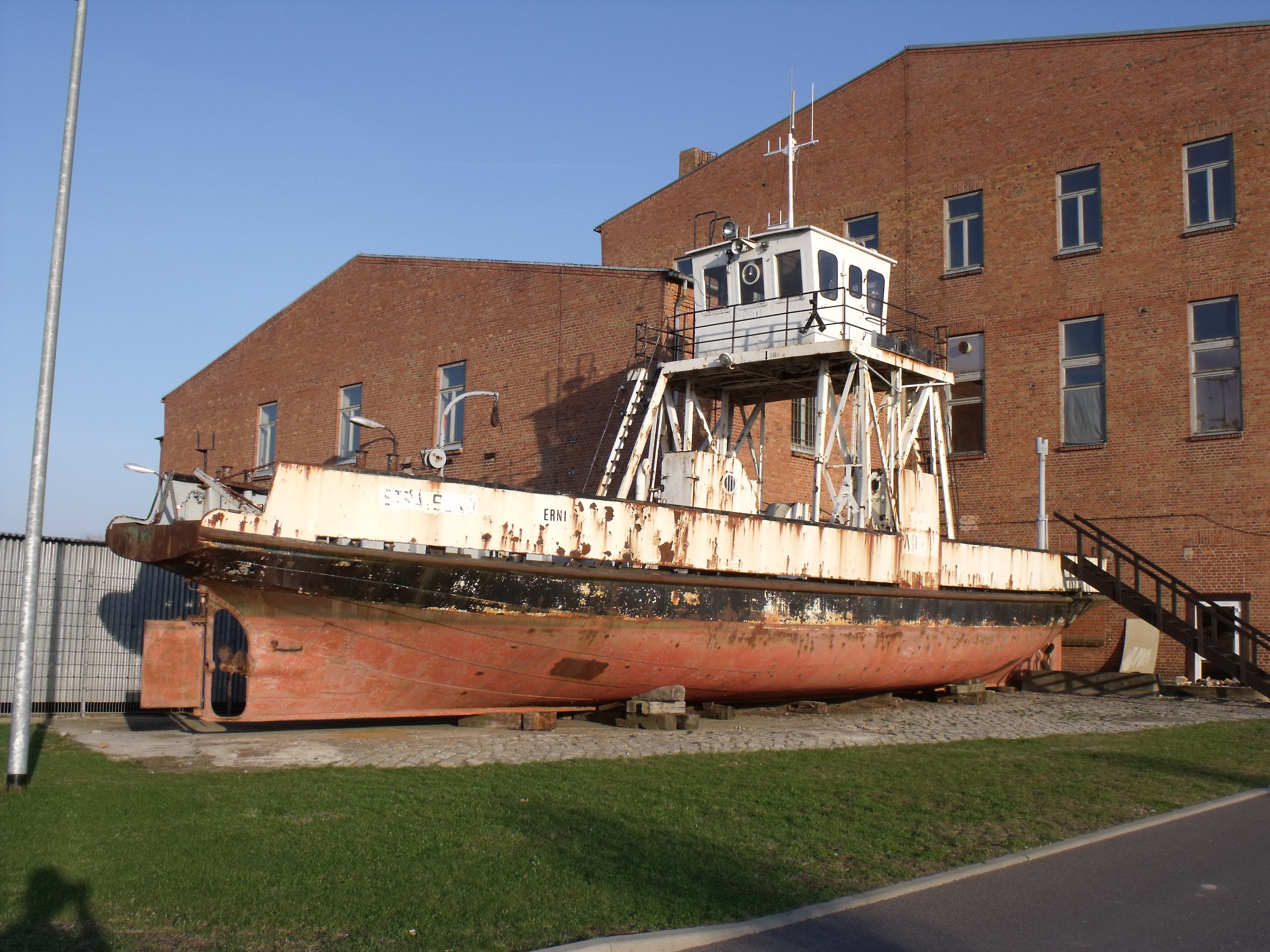
The old ferry boat, Wittow, in Barth, now on land (April 2010)

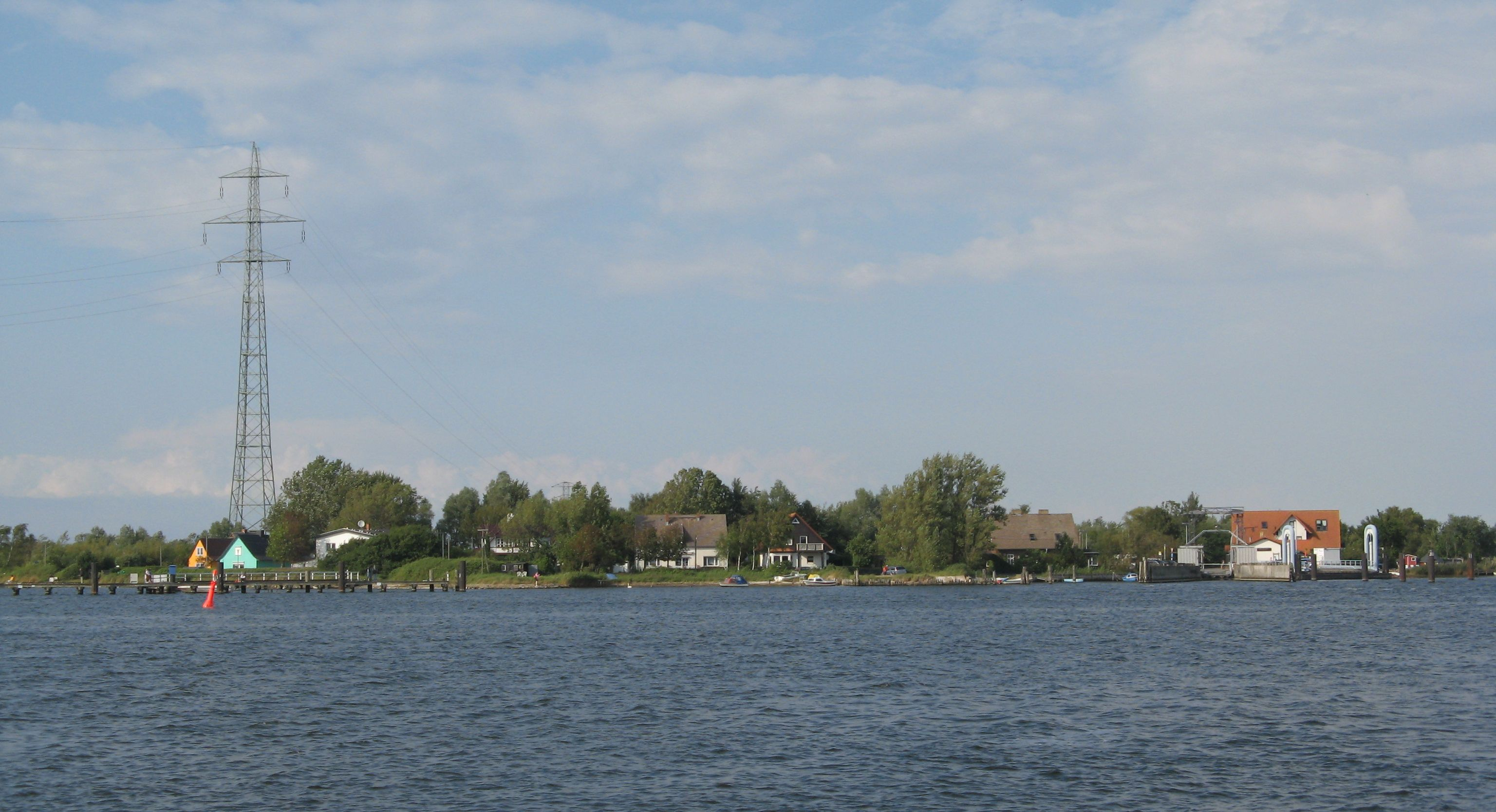
The Wiek village of Wittower Fähre

The Wittow Ferry (German: Wittower Fähre) is a ferry service for foot passengers and vehicles (up to a total weight of 30 t each) from the heart of the German Baltic Sea island of Rügen, the Muttland, to the peninsula of Wittow to the north. It has also given its name to the parish of Wittower Fähre in the municipality of Wiek. This lies on the Rassower Strom at the tip of the tongue of land between the lagoons of Wieker Bodden and Breetzer Bodden on its northern shore. On the southern shore the ferry landing stage is located between the villages of Vaschvitz and Fischersiedlung in the municipality of Trent.

When the water surface of the bodden freezes over in severe winters, this narrows in the channel to and from the Großer Jasmunder Bodden, which is about 350 metres wide, is the last stretch of water to remain open and is a refuge for numerous water fowl.

== History ==
By the Middle Ages it was common for boats to cross at this point. Because the coastline of Rügen is so deeply incised, alternative detours by land were very long. Moreover, the dyke between Großen Jasmunder Bodden and the Kleiner Jasmunder Bodden near Lietzow was not built until 1868, so that the land route as far as the Schmale Heide (Prora) was not practicable.

Not until the opening of the 37.9 km long 750-mm narrow gauge railway line from Bergen via Trent, Wittow Ferry and Wiek to Altenkirchen of the Rügen Light Railway (RüKB) d on 21 December 1896 was there a regular and capable ferry service. For decades, two ferry boats, the Wittow and the Bergen, that had been built in 1896 and 1911 in Stettin, transported three wagons or (on request) a steam locomotive across. Normally only goods wagons were carried; passengers had to change.

On 10 September 1968 the section of line from Wittower Fähre (Fährhof)–Altenkirchen was closed, and the ships now just ferried foot passengers and cars. As a result the light railway ferry passed into history. On 19 January 1970 the line from Bergen to Wittower Fähre was also closed. The ferry boats and facilities were then transferred to the Weiße Flotte ("White Fleet").

The names of the station on the northern shore was Fährhof and that on the southern shore was Wittower Fähre, neither of which corresponded to the names of their local parishes.

Both ships continued to work until 1994 and 1996 respectively. The Bergen was scrapped in 1997 after initial aspirations to preserve it in the Prora Museum of Technology and the Wittow lay until 2005 next to the old Trichter, the original landing stage in the ferry port, and was then to be converted in Barth in the a museum café. As a result it was moved to the museum in the former sugar factory at Barth Harbour. Currently the Wittow is available for sale from the museum (as at July 2011).

In 1996 a new ferry boat, also called the Wittow, was brought into service, after a wider, more modern ferry landing stage had been built.

== Other infrastructure ==
A 110 kV overhead cable to the Bohlendorf substation crosses the bodden by the Wittow Ferry on two, 95-metre-high masts. It has a span of 840 metres.
