= Tromper Wiek =

Bay in the Baltic Sea

Coordinates: 54°36.7585′N 13°27.1655′E

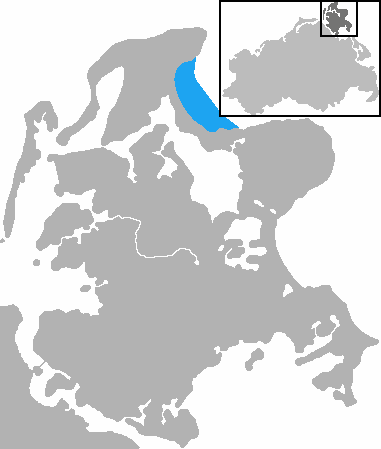
Location of the Tromper Wiek

The Tromper Wiek is a bay on the Baltic Sea between the peninsulas of Wittow and Jasmund on the island of Rügen in northeast Germany.

This bay (locally: Wiek) runs in a wide arc from Cape Arkona in the north, through the villages of Juliusruh and Glowe on both ends of the Schaabe spit, to the start of the Rügen chalk cliff area of Stubnitz east of Lohme.

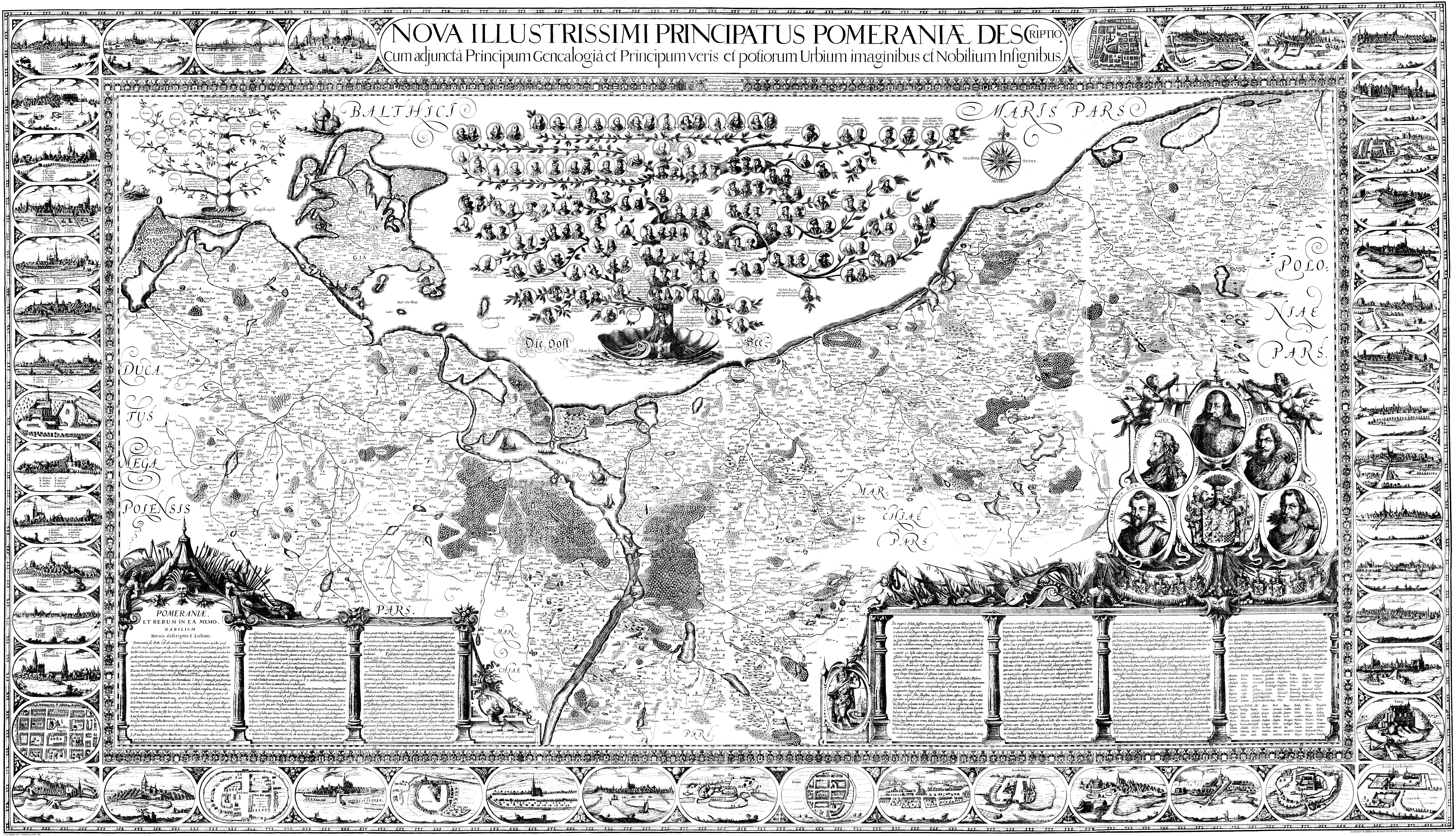
Duchy of Pomerania Map, 1618

Some claim that the bay is named after the Dutch admiral Cornelis Tromp (1629–1691), although on a 1618 map of the area the bay is named Trumper Wick.

== Literature ==
- Harald Krause: Wiek und Wikinger – Entstehung und Entwicklung der Schifffahrt und maritimer Begriffe der Seefahrer im erweiterten Ostseeraum. In: Stier und Greif. Blätter zur Kultur- und Landesgeschichte in Mecklenburg-Vorpommern. Jahrg. 19, Schwerin 2009, pp. 10–21
