= Rassower Strom =

Waterway in Germany

Coordinates: 54°33′28.2″N 13°14′49.9″E

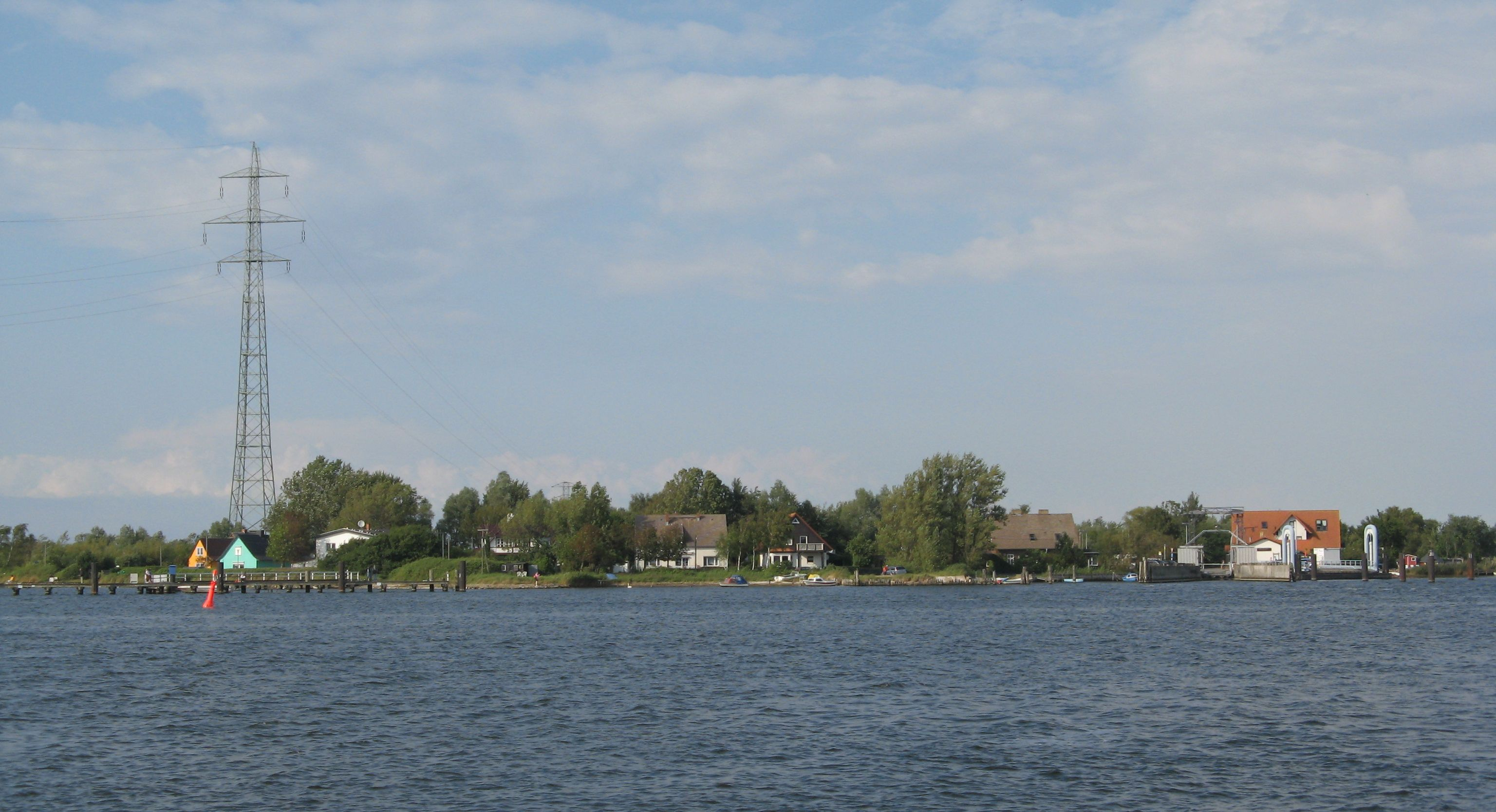
View over the Rassower Strom to the Wiek village of Wittower Fähre

The Rassower Strom is a waterway located in Germany that lies at the tip of the tongue of land between the lagoons of the Wieker Bodden and Breetzer Bodden, and is part of the North Rügen Bodden Chain. On its southern shore is the ferry boat landing stage between the villages of Vaschvitz and Fischersiedlung in the municipality of Trent. It separates the heartland of the island of Rügen, the Muttland, from the peninsula of Wittow in the north. At its narrowest point,

it is 350 metres (1,150 ft) wide.

The Wittow Ferry crosses the Strom. It is a ferry service for foot passengers and vehicles (up to a permitted total weight of 30 t each).

In severe winters, when the water surface of the bodden freezes over, the Rassower Strom remains largely ice-free as a result of the current to and from the Großer Jasmunder Bodden and provides a refuge for large numbers of water fowl.

Several academic studies have been conducted regarding the microbial populations within Rassower Strom.
