= Trent, Germany =

Trent
- Municipality
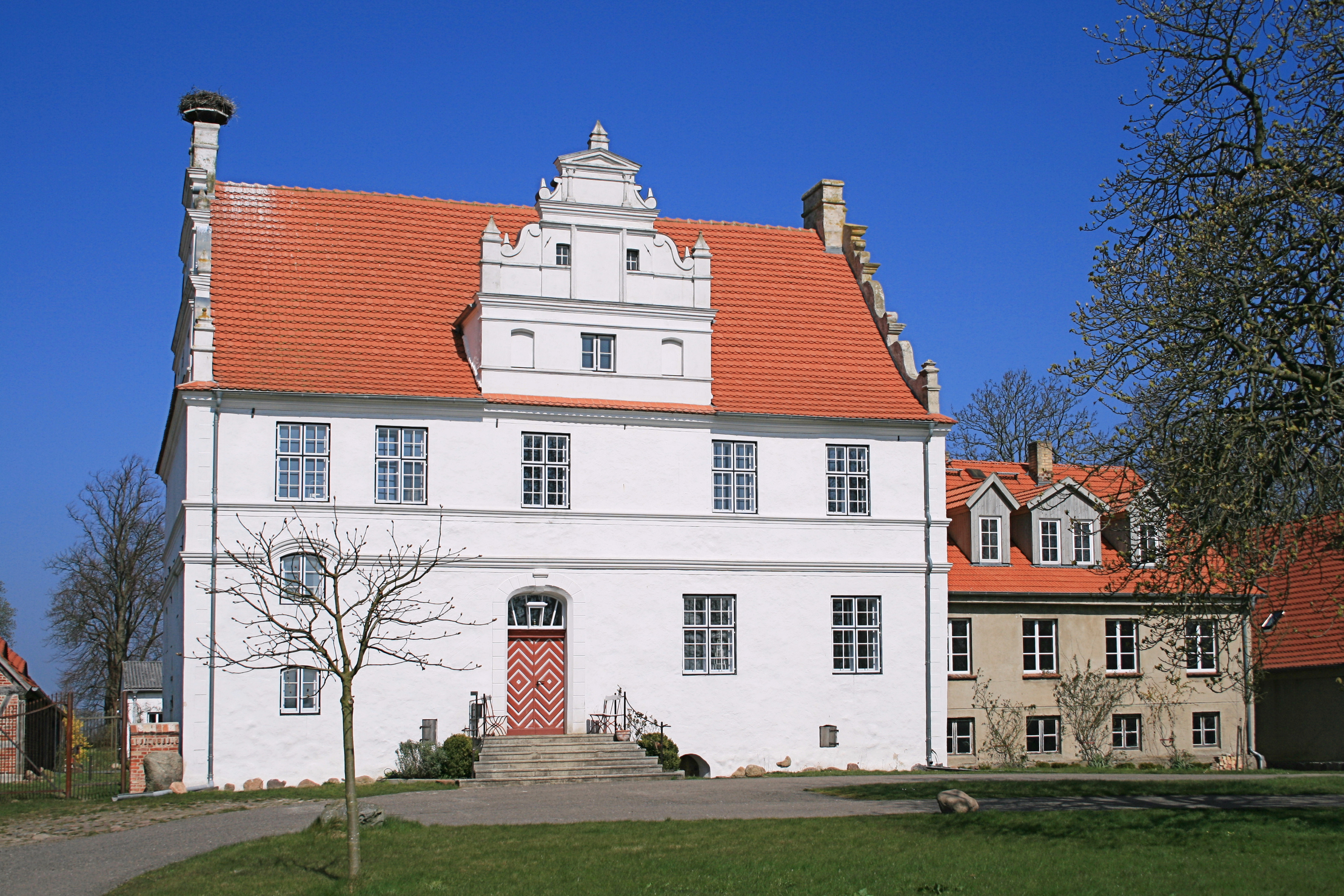
- Manor House Venz in Trent

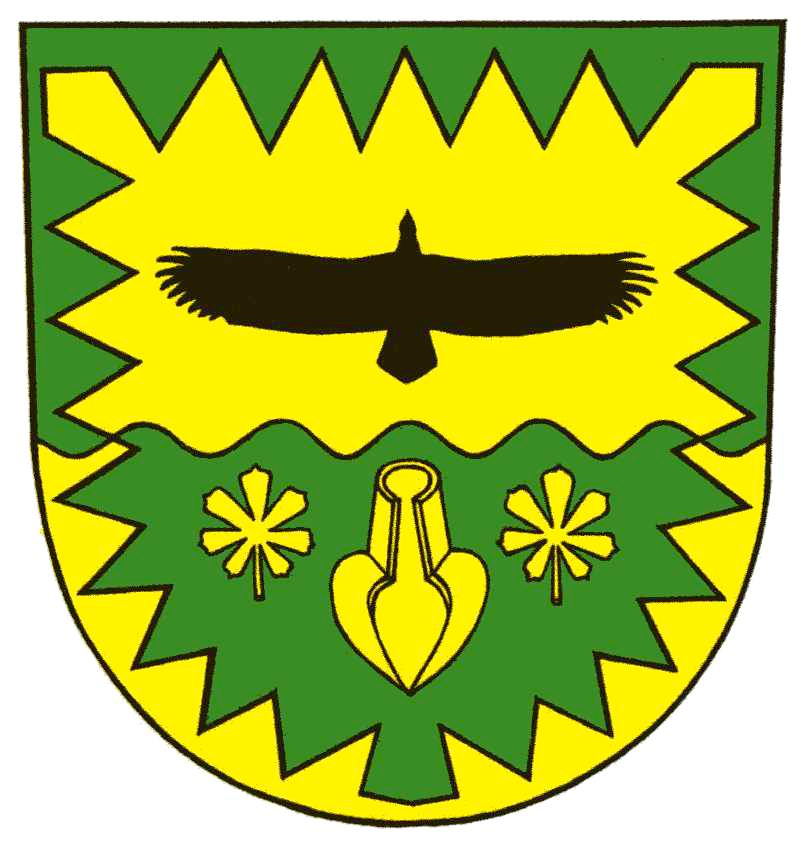
- Coat of arms

- Location of Trent within Vorpommern-Rügen district
- Interactive map of Trent
- Location within Germany Location within Mecklenburg-Vorpommern
- Coordinates: 54°31′N 13°15′E
- Country: Germany
- State: Mecklenburg-Vorpommern
- District: Vorpommern-Rügen
- Municipal assoc.: West-Rügen
- Subdivisions: 12

Government
  - Mayor: Gunther Krüger

Area
  - Total: 35.40 km^{2} (13.67 sq mi)
- Elevation: 5 m (16 ft)

Population (2025-12-31)
  - Total: 622
  - Density: 17.6/km^{2} (45.5/sq mi)
- Time zone: UTC+01:00 (CET)
  - Summer (DST): UTC+02:00 (CEST)
- Postal codes: 18569
- Dialling codes: 038305, 038309
- Vehicle registration: RÜG

Trent is a municipality in the Vorpommern-Rügen district, in Mecklenburg-Vorpommern, Germany.

== Geography ==
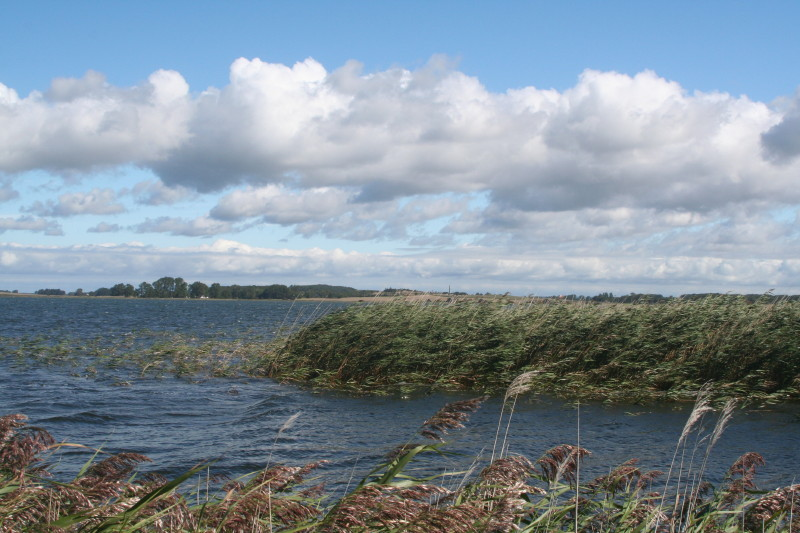
View over the Libnitzer Bodden

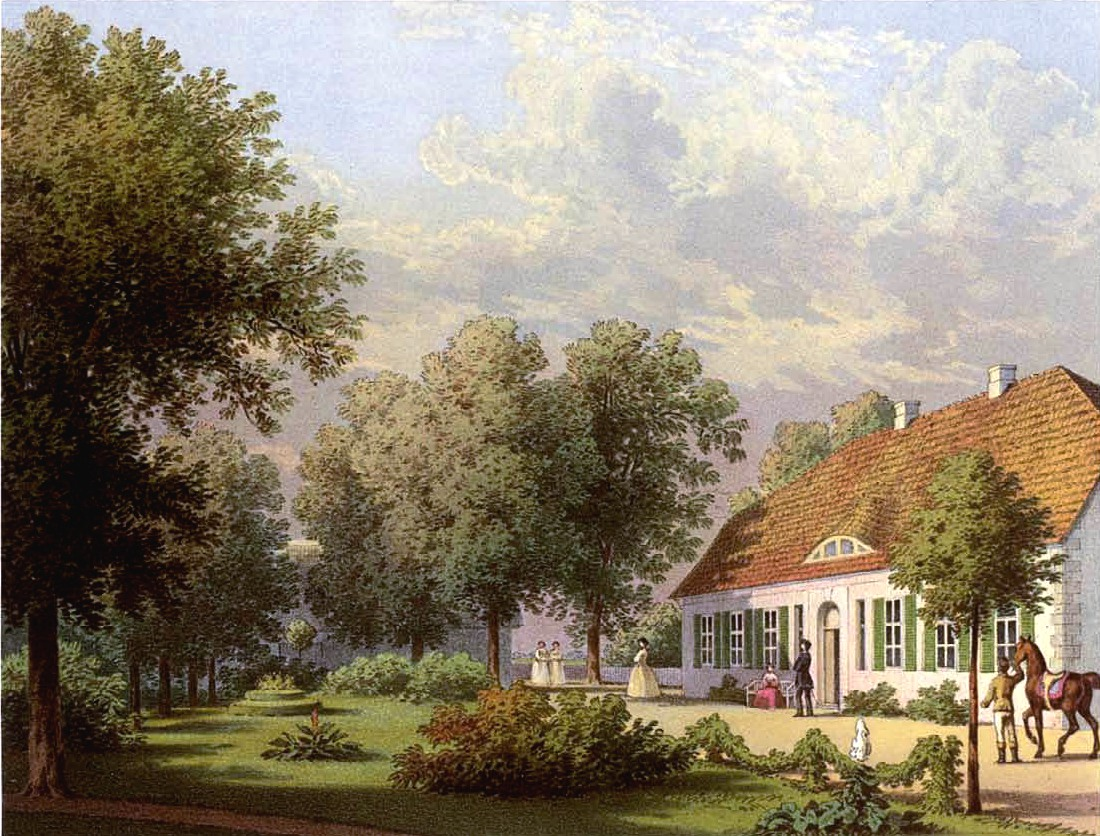
Palace Zubzow around 1860, Edition by Alexander Duncker

Trent lies in the northwest of Muttland on the German Baltic Sea island of Rügen, about 17 kilometres northwest of the town of Bergen auf Rügen. The municipality is bounded in the north by the lagoons of the Wieker Bodden and Breetzer Bodden and in the east by the Neuendorfer Wiek bay. A small part of the parish borders on the village of Freesen on the Udarser Wiek.

Trent lies on the old historic trade route, the Herring Road (Heringsstraße), that ran from Stralsund to the peninsula of Halbinsel Wittow.

=== Subdivisions ===
The following villages belong to Trent: Fischersiedlung, Freesen, Ganschvitz, Grosow, Holstenhagen, Jabelitz, Libnitz, Trent, Tribkevitz, Vaschvitz, Venz and Zubzow.
