= Bug (Rügen) =

Westernmost part of the island of Rügen

Coordinates: 54°34′55″N 13°12′5″E

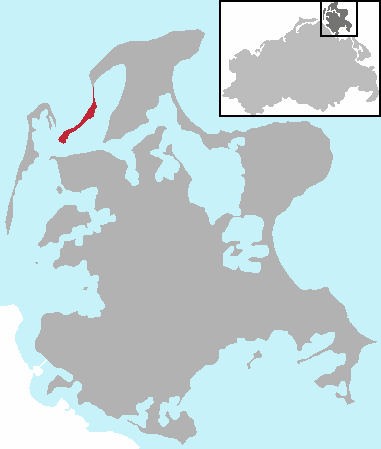
Location of Bug on Rügen

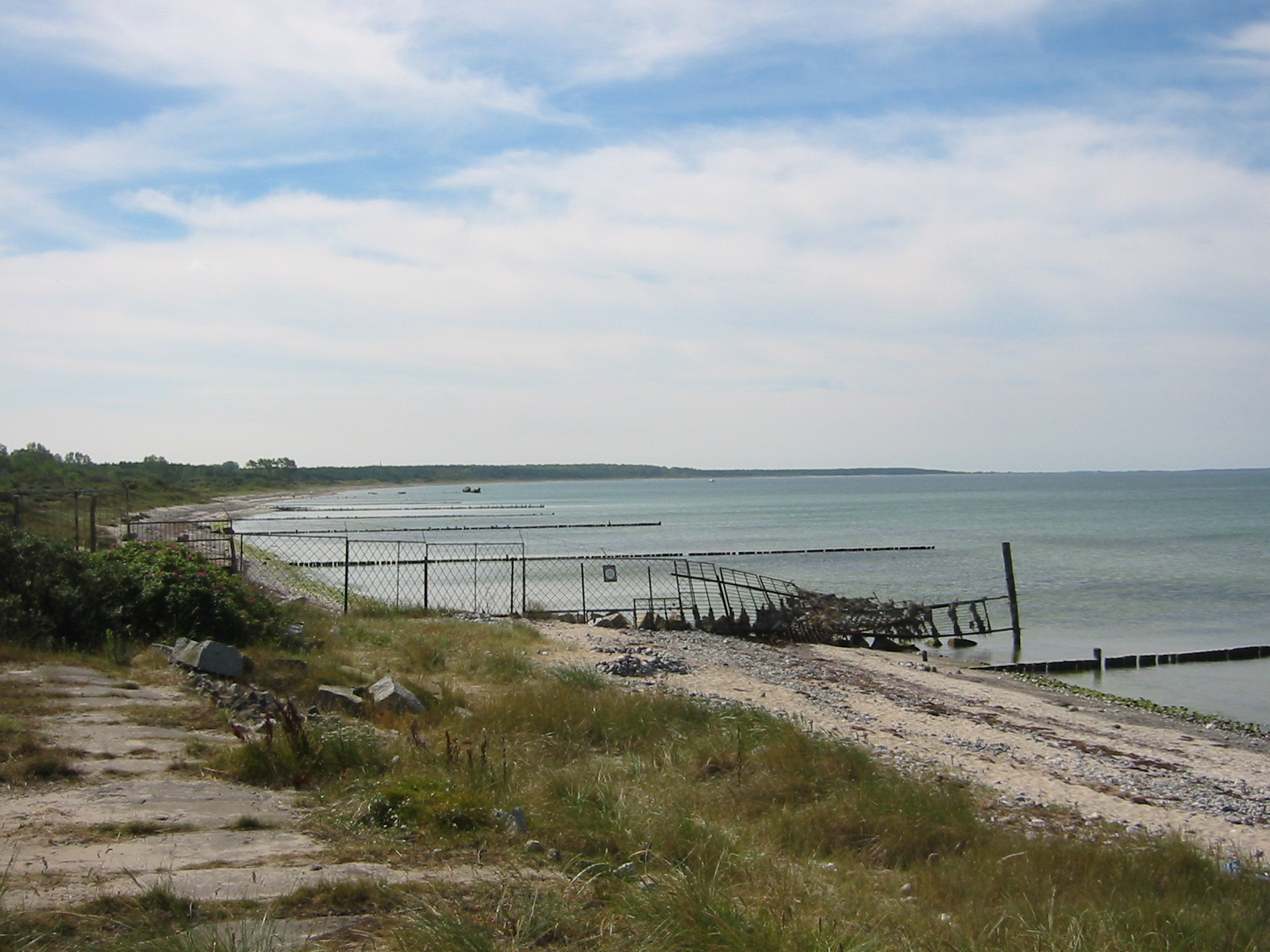
View from the northern tip looking southwest

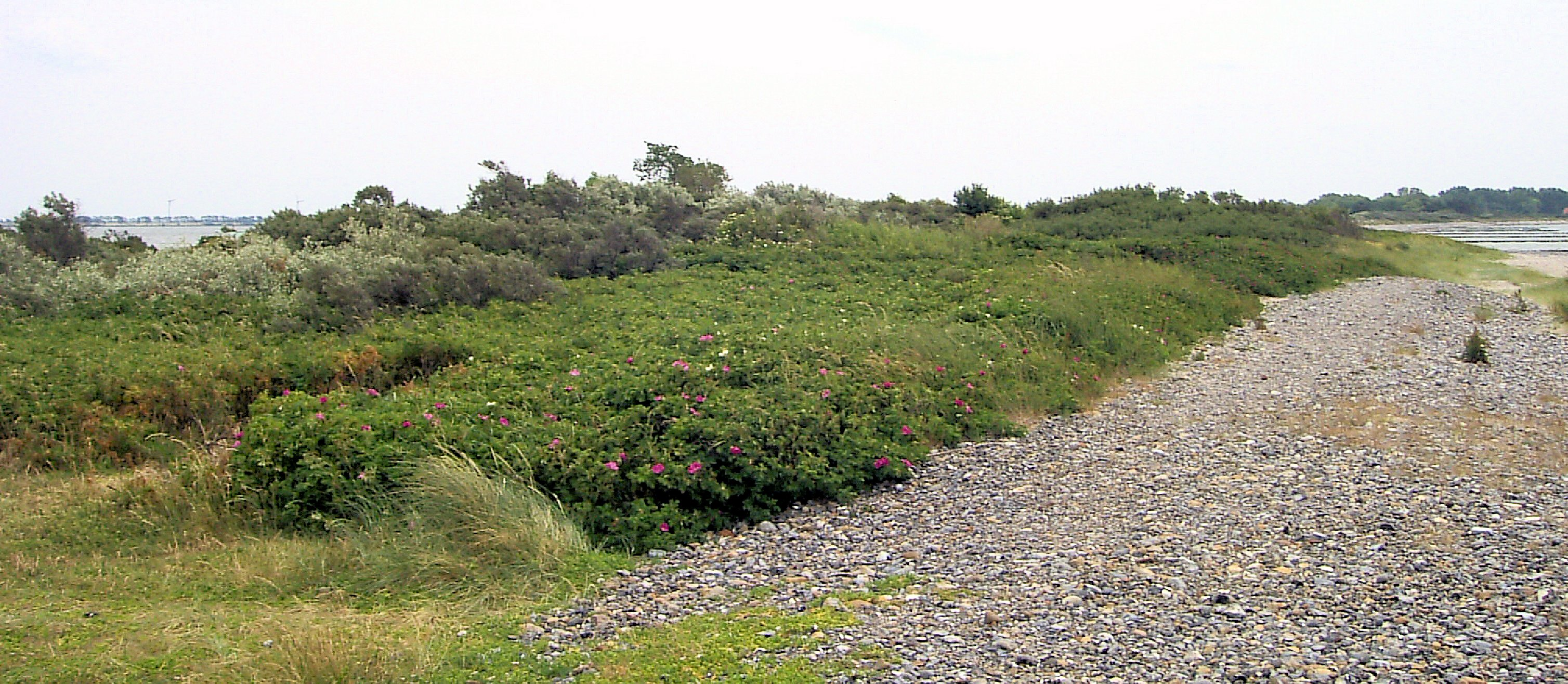
Narrowest point on the peninsula. Left: the Wieker Bodden, right: the Baltic Sea outer coast

Bug (German pronunciation: [buːk]) is the name both of the westernmost tongue of land (Landzunge) on the peninsula of Wittow on the German island of Rügen, as well as the name of the former village there. Bug begins south of the village of Dranske and belongs territorially to that municipality.

== Origin of the name ==
One theory suggests the name Bug goes back to a landowner, Baronet Antonius de Buge, first mentioned in 1284. Another suggests that the word Bug is derived from the German word Biegung = "bend". It is also possible that it may have come from a Slavic word bug = beech.

== Geography ==
The peninsula of Bug runs in a southwesterly direction from the village of Dranske for a distance of 8 km and has an area of 500 ha. It is only 55 metres wide at its narrowest point in the northeast; in the southwest its maximum width measures about 1,500 metres. To the west of the Bug is the Baltic Sea with the northern part of the island of Hiddensee. To the southwest is the lagoon of Vitter Bodden. A large inlet separates the peninsula from the main body of Rügen itself, comprising the lagoon of Wieker Bodden in the northeast, and the Buger Bodden and the channel of the Rassower Strom in the southeast.

Its southernmost point is the Buger Haken ("Hook of Bug"). Other spits on the bodden side, from north to south, are the Blevser Haken, Eckort, Fischer Haken and Neubessin (not to be confused with the nearby Neubessin on the island of Hiddensee).

== Geology ==
The Bug is the largest spit on the island of Rügen, and is still growing. The windwatts of Altbessin and Neubessin in front of the island of Hiddensee to the west are growing towards Bug. Only a regularly dredged shipping channel separates Bug from the island of Hiddensee.

== Flora and fauna ==
The southern part of the Bug belongs to the Western Pomerania Lagoon Area National Park. The Bug was a military out-of-bounds zone for many years. That enabled nature to develop relatively undisturbed.

The Bug has woods, dunes and species-rich wet areas. The woods are mostly laid out as a forest. As in the northeast of the neighbouring island of Hiddensee the formation of new land in the south of Bug provides a habitat for numerous invertebrates, like worms and mussels. This rich source of food draws rare native bird species as well as many migrating birds.

== History ==
- 1540 – Christoph von der Lancken establishes large fish traps for catching fish.
- 1615 – the Bug is totally flooded by a storm surge.
- 1658 – construction of a post station as an intermediate station on the Stralsund to Ystad route
- 1683 – the post line from Stralsund via Bug to Ystad is opened. The Swedish postal ship, Hiorten, plied this route from 1692 to 1702.
- 1700 – the Bug is now treeless as a result of clearing and mostly consists of sandy steppe and pastureland.
- Between 1806 and 1810 – closure of the post route
- 1822 – the Bug-Ystad route is opened again, this time with steamships.
- 1835-1930 - the Bug grew annually by six metres a year thanks to sand deposition.
- 1865 – construction of a telegraph station at the postal harbour of Bug
- 1872 - the Bug is cut off from Wittow by the floods of 12/13 November 1872.
- 1887/1888 – reforestation of Bug
- 1895 – construction of a forester's lodge, start of pilot operations
- 1914-1945 - used as a military air base
- 1916 – extension for the seaplane base
- 1931–1937 – clearing of the Bug: demolition of the customs station, eviction notices served on the inhabitants, in Dranske almost all buildings were knocked down
- 1935–1945 – Bug air base
- 1946/1947 – the Red Army blow up and dismantle the installations on the Bug. The asphalt airfield was blown up and planted.
- 1947 – the Bug is uninhabited, in the south nature spreads unhindered.
- 1954 – a youth hostel is built.
- 1960s – East German People’s Navy set up a speedboat base
- 1965 – the NVA opens Dranske/Bug duty station for the 6th Flotilla of the Volksmarine.
- to 1990 – the Bug is an out-of-bounds area.
- 1990/1991 – use of the fast patrol boat base by the Bundesmarine
- 1991–1999 – concepts of use put forward
- 1999 – Naval History and Local History Museum established at the Drankse post office (later moved to the old school)
- since 2001 – renovation of the Bug, demolition of all old buildings and plans for a holiday and leisure centre
- since 2003 – project stalls due to lack of sufficient funding from its private investors
- 2019 – Airstrip built for small planes to land
