= Beuchel =

German island

Geography
- Location: Baltic Sea
- Coordinates: 54°32′19″N 13°18′0″E
- Area: 0.07 ha (0.17 acres)
- Length: 400 m (1300 ft)
- Width: 100 m (300 ft)

Administration
- Germany

Demographics
- Population: 0

Beuchel (German pronunciation: [ˈbɔʏçl̩]) is a tiny, uninhabited island in the Neuendorfer Wiek bay of the German island of Rügen, and is only a little over a hundred metres off Rügen. It measures roughly 400 by 100 metres, and has an area of 7 ha (approximately 17. acres). The kidney-shaped island is flat and treeless.

The island was declared a nature reserve in 1940 to protect the birds brooding or resting there, and cannot be visited.
