= Lake Tetzitz, Liddow Peninsula and Banzelvitz Hills Nature Reserve =

Nature reserve in Mecklenburg-Vorpommern, Germany

Coordinates: 54.541°N 13.36796°E

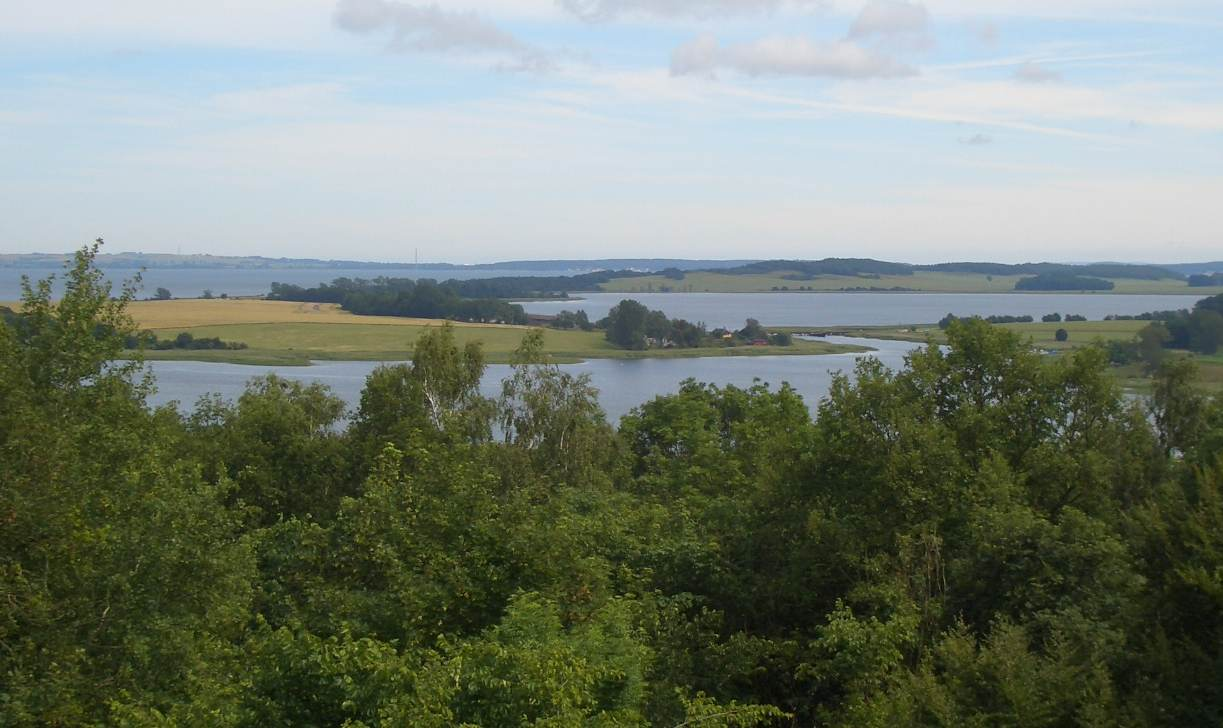
View from the northwest into the reserve (Grümbke Tower)

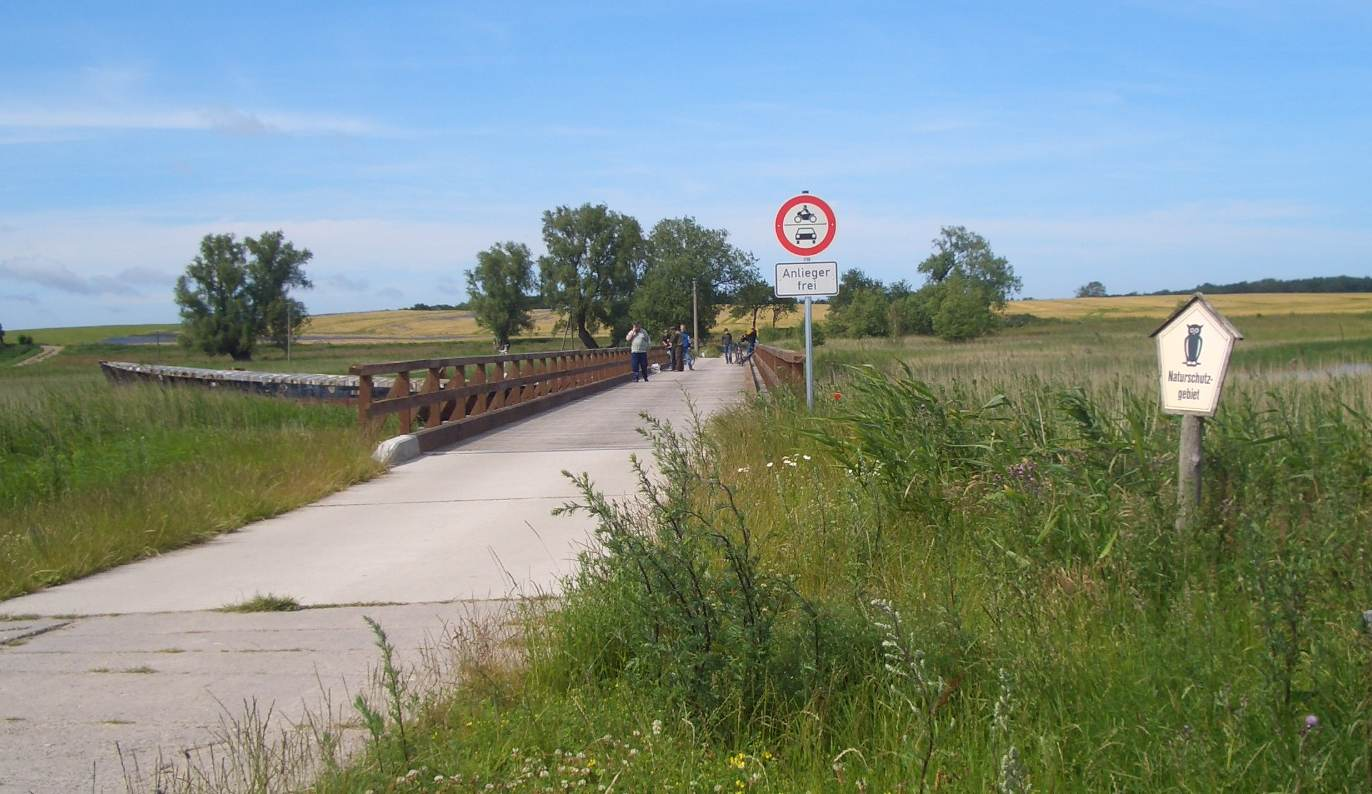
Bridge over the Liddow-Strom

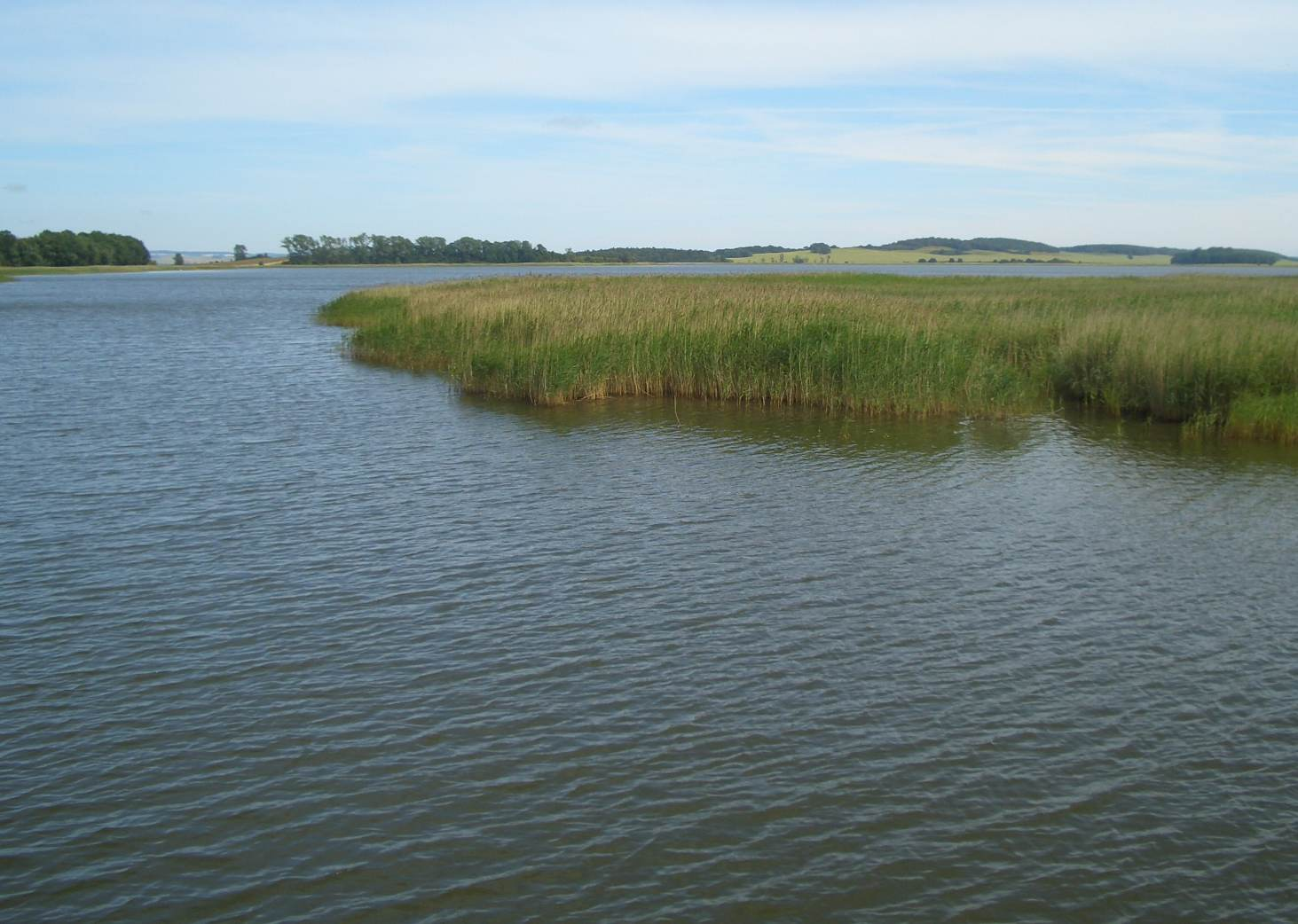
Lake Tetzitz

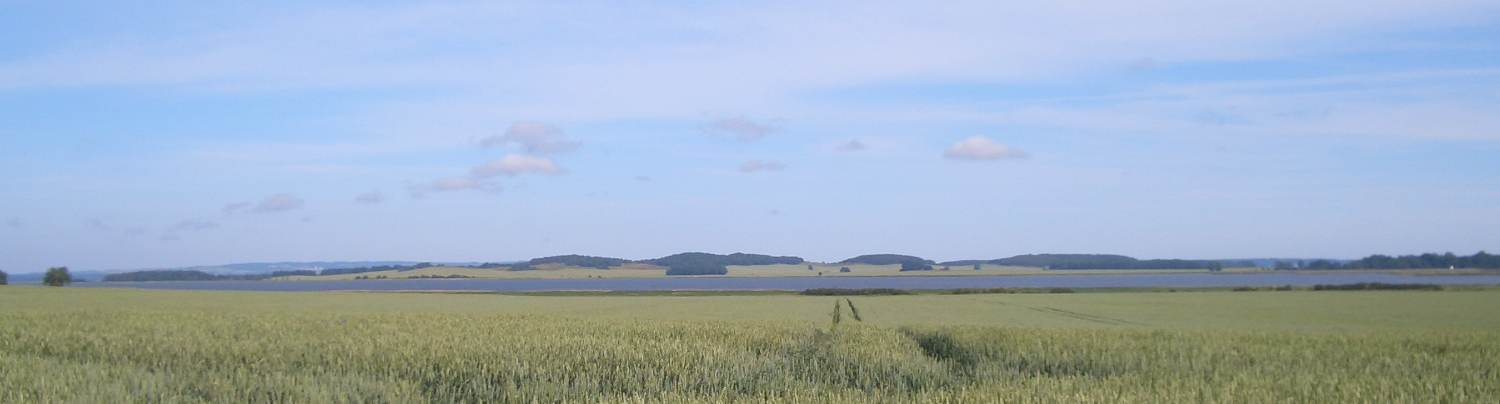
Banzelvitz Hills

The Lake Tetzitz, Liddow Peninsula and Banzelvitz Hills Nature Reserve (German: Naturschutzgebiet Tetzitzer See mit Halbinsel Liddow und Banzelvitzer Berge) is a nature reserve, 1,088 hectares in area, on the German island of Rügen in Mecklenburg-Western Pomerania. It was officially designated as such on 5 November 1990 and expanded in 1994. Nearby villages are Neuenkirchen and Rappin. The area under protection is a section of the North Rügen Bodden (bodden are shallow lagoons typical of the region) which has a great variety of habitats and is an important roosting and breeding area for the bird world. The elements that give the reserve its name are Lake Tetzitz (Tetzitzer See) in the west, the peninsula of Liddow in the centre and the Banzelvitz Hills (Banzelvitzer Berge) in the eastern part of the nature reserve. Lake Tetzitz is linked to the Großer Jasmunder Bodden by the channel of the Liddow Strom.

The reserve is generally in a good condition. The grazed salt meadows are classified as very good. Lake Tetzitz is affected by fertiliser pollution. The nature reserve is protected by EU law as part of the North Rügen Bodden Landscape Special Area of Conservation (FFH-Gebiet Nordrügensche Boddenlandschaft and the Inland Bodden of Rügen Special Protection Area (Vogelschutzgebiet Binnenbodden von Rügen).

The footpath from Liddow to Banzelvitz passes through the reserve in places.

== Literature ==
- Umweltministerium Mecklenburg-Vorpommern, ed. (2003), "Tetzitzer See mit Halbinsel Liddow und Banzelvitzer Berge 254", Die Naturschutzgebiete in Mecklenburg-Vorpommern (in German), Schwerin: Demmler-Verlag, pp. 114f, ISBN 3-91-015052-7
