= Weiße Flotte (Stralsund) =

German shipping company

Weiße Flotte GmbH
- Industry: Shipping
- Founded: 1957
- Headquarters: Stralsund, Germany
- Area served: Baltic Sea
- Services: Passenger transportation
- Parent: FRS Group
- Subsidiaries: Reederei Hiddensee
- Website: weisse-flotte.de

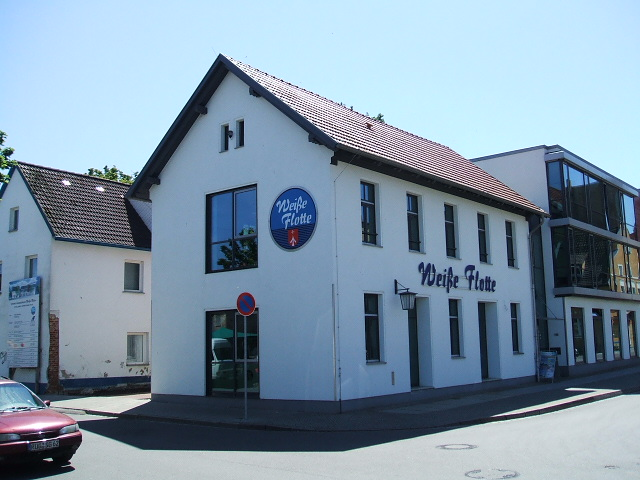
Old and new head offices of the Weiße Flotte in Stralsund

The Weiße Flotte ("White Fleet") is a shipping company with its head office in Stralsund, Germany, that offers passenger and car ferry services as well as excursions by boat, especially along the Baltic Sea coast of the state of Mecklenburg-Western Pomerania.

== History ==
In 1945, after the Second World War, shipping by private shipowners initially picked up again on a moderate scale under the direction of the Arbeitsgemeinschaft Binnenschiffahrt Körperschaft des öffentlichen Rechts with its head office in Berlin. On 27 October 1949 the state-owned firm of Deutsche Schiffahrts- und Umschlagsbetriebs-Zentrale (DSU) was established with its main branch in Stralsund. All the freight and passenger transport on the inland waterways of East Germany was transferred to this company.

Founded on 1 January 1957, the VEB passenger shipping company in Stralsund, Weiße Flotte, with its head office in Stralsund took over the overwhelming majority of excursion and scheduled services along the entire Baltic Sea coast. This company initially had just eleven staff and another 17 employees as well as 10 motor vessels, with a total seating of 1,511, in its first year of operations.

Over the years, branches were set up along the Baltic coast, the ships were modernized and the number of staff increased. Amongst the services operated at that time were excursions to Gedser, Fehmarn and Møn, round trips around Rügen and Hiddensee, ocean crossings and harbour cruises. After extensive renovations to the ships of the "White Fleet" in 1958/59 and the addition of a ferry service to Altefähr, e.g. with the Stralsunder, the number of ships at the beginning of 1959 increased to 17 vessels with a total of 2,488 seats. Three years later, the fleet of passenger ships rose to 23 through the acquisition of the Genossenschaftsreederei Hiddensee of Vitte. Now a total of 3,251 seats were available. In 1961 two hydrofoils, the TF 10-1 and TF 10-2 joined the Weiße Flotte from Roßlau, and were assigned to services between Warnemünde and Rostock-Kabutzenhof. By the end of 1963, the Weiße Flotte employed 36 passenger ships with 4,740 seats and two freighters were employed on a total of 44 scheduled services.

In 1974, the Weiße Flotte was further modernized with the purchase of three hydrofoils of the Kometa-M type. The boats, which had been built in the Soviet Union at the shipyard of Poti (Georgian SSR), were selected for fast services on the Stralsund - Sassnitz - Szczecin or Rostock - Wismar lines. With a speed of 32 knots (60 km/h), these boats needed only about four hours, for example, for the route from Stralsund via Sassnitz to Swinoujscie and were thus much faster than the cruise liners.

With a fleet of three hydrofoils, 31 passenger ships, seven ferries, two freighters and a ferry unit (Fährschubeinheit) for heavy goods vehicles, the Weiße Flotte transported 4.7 million passengers on 85 routes in 1989.

In 1990 the Weiße Flotte was privatized and taken over by the shipping association of Förde Reederei Seetouristik from Flensburg. The traditional name of Weiße Flotte remained unchanged. All the old ships were sold and replaced with new, more modern and more comfortable ships.

The president of the district council of Rügen, Gesine Skrepski, opened a new jetty for the Wittow Ferry in 1994.

In 1995, the Reederei Hiddensee, a subsidiary of the Weiße Flotte, was founded. The Reederei Hiddensee operates all the regular services from Zingst, Wiek, Stralsund and Schaprode to the island of Hiddensee. Through the establishment of Reederei Hiddensee the area of operations of the Weiße Flotte expanded to include ferry services (Glewitz - Stahlbrode, Warnemünde - Hohe Düne, Wittow Nord - Wittow-Süd) and excursions on the Baltic Sea.

== Ships/routes ==
The Weiße Flotte runs several car and passenger ferries along the Baltic Sea coast of Mecklenburg-Western Pomerania.

=== Car ferries ===
- Car ferry: Warnemünde - Hohe Düne

The two ferries, the Breitling and the Warnow that shuttle between the Baltic Sea resort of Warnemünde and the village of Hohe Düne, were built in 1994 and 1995 at the Oderwerft Eisenhüttenstadt shipyard on the Oder. The technical data for the 2 ships are identical. They have a length of 38 metres and a beam of 11.60 metres. They can seat 150 passengers and carry 25 cars. The engines generate 3 x 186 kW, and the boats can travel at up to 7.5 knots.

- Car ferry: Stahlbrode - Glewitz

Three car ferries ply the route between Stahlbrode and Glewitz (Bay of Greifswald), the Glewitz, the Stahlbrode and the Stralsund. The Glewitz and Stahlbrode were built in 1965 at the Varvet shipyard in Sweden. They have a length of 58.30 m and a width of 12.20 m, and can carry 300 passengers and 45 cars. With an engine power of 3 x 110 kW, they can reach a speed of 7 knots. The Stralsund, also built on the Varvet yard in 1963, is 41 metres long and 11.40 metres wide. It has room for 50 passengers and 30 vehicles. The two engines each have a capacity of 144 kW. The ship can reach a speed of 7 knots

- Car ferry: Wittow Nord - Wittow Süd

The route to Rügen, known as the Wittow Ferry, is worked by a ferry called the Wittow. The ferry was built in 1996 on the Oder shipyard of Eisenhüttenstadt. It has a length of 38 metres and a width of 12 metres and can carry 150 passengers and 45 cars. The engines produce a power of 3 x 186 kW, so the ferry can attain a speed of 7.5 knots.

=== Passenger ferries ===
- Passenger ferry: Stralsund - Altefähr

The passenger ferry Altefähr was built in 1996 at the shipyard of WBG Berlin. It has a length of 21.50 m and a width of 5.50 m and can seat 225 passengers. With an engine output of 187 kW the ferry can attain a speed of 11 knots.
The ferry offers harbour cruises in Stralsund.
