= Neuendorfer Wiek and Beuchel Island Nature Reserve =

Coordinates: 54.53582°N 13.30067°E

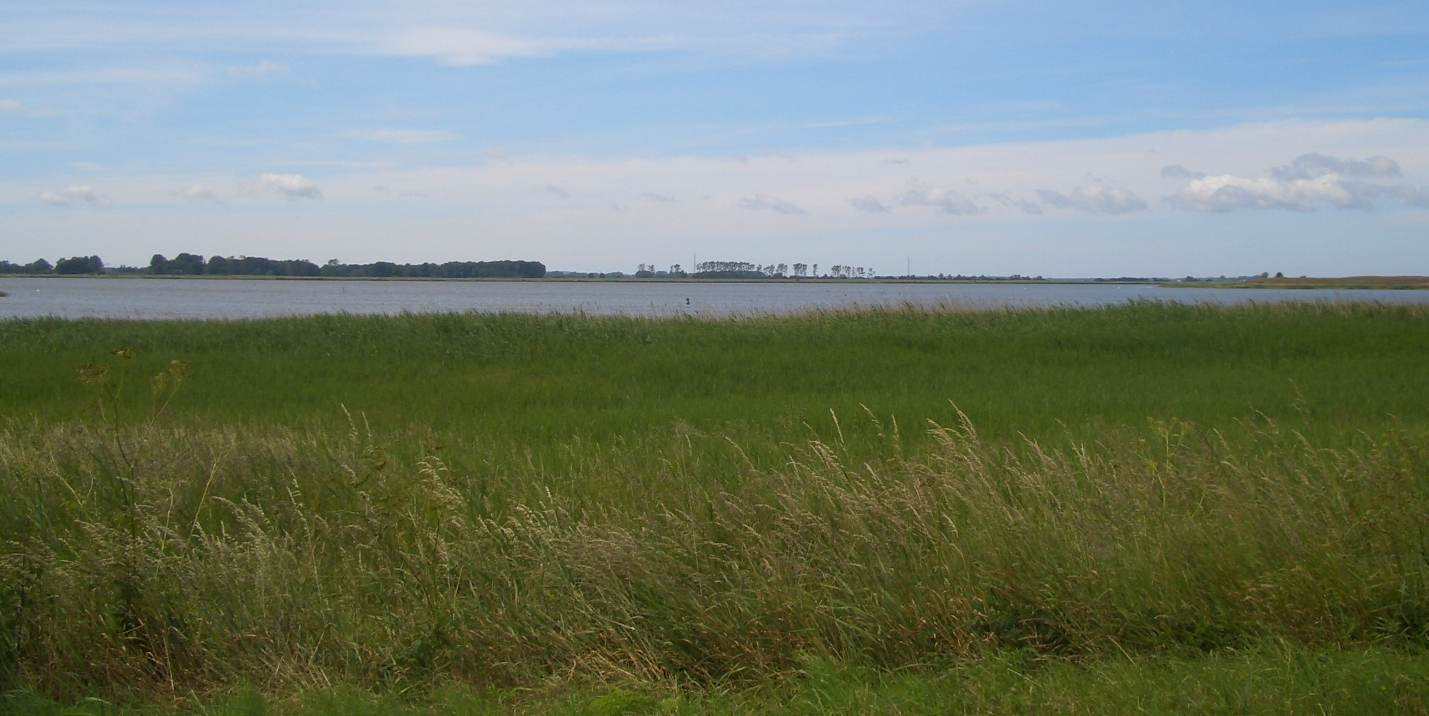
View into the Neuendorfer Wiek

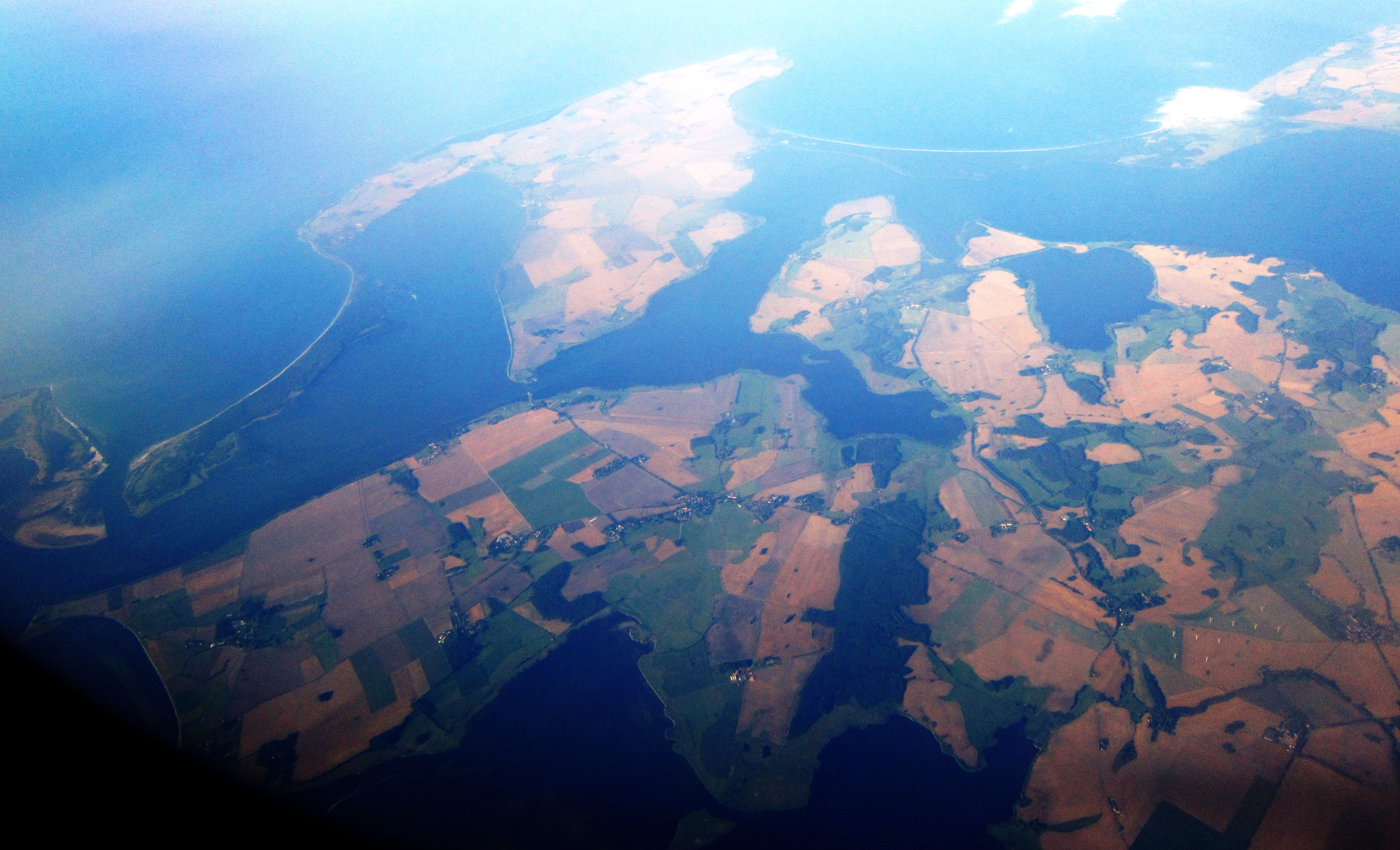
Location of Neuendorfer Wiek, with Beuchel as the little C-shaped green island in the centre of the image

The Neuendorfer Wiek and Beuchel Island Nature Reserve (German: Naturschutzgebiet Neuendorfer Wiek mit Insel Beuchel) is a nature reserve on the German Baltic Sea island of Rügen in the state of Mecklenburg-Vorpommern. It is 550 hectares in area. The island of Beuchel was designated as a reserve on 25 July 1940. In 1999 and 2004 it was extended to include the bay of Neuendorfer Wiek.

Its neighbouring villages are Trent and Neuenkirchen. Its conservation aim is the preservation of a characteristic and representative section of the North Rügen Bodden Chain, which contains rare and threatened biotope types as well as habitats for a rich variety of fish and diverse breeding and roosting birds.

The reserve is assessed as being in "good" condition. Contrary to the conservation aim, there are attempts to mine gravel.

The nature reserve is protected under the EU Habitats Directive as the Nordrügensche Boddenlandschaft Special Protection Area and a Binnenbodden von Rügen Special Area of Conservation (i.e. bird reserve).

The reserve may be observed from the surrounding roads.

== History ==
The area was formed during the last ice mass advances of the Weichselian glaciation. Eskers are found north of Zessin. The shoreline areas were extensively used for centuries as a salt meadows. Due to the lack of dykes, there were periodic floods. The southern part of the Neuendorfer Wiek was dyked in the late 19th century and drained by two wind pumps (Schöpfwerke). On the reed-fringed shores, thatch harvesting (Schilfwerbung) took place during the winter months. Fishing with traps on the waters of the bay has been carried out for centuries. The line of eskers was grazed by sheep and horses until the 1950s and used as arable land until 1990.

== Flora and fauna ==
Wash margins, brackish water reed beds, salt marshes and steep coasts are typical of the nature reserve. To the east of the area is sandy calcareous grassland with cottonrose or Dillenius' speedwell.

The island of Beuchel is an important breeding ground for many bird species, such as ducks, geese, swans, mergansers, waders, gulls and common and Sandwich terns. The Neuendorfer Wiek protects the island from disturbance and is also of great importance as a breeding ground for other species such as great crested grebe, coot, pochard, marsh harrier, reed warbler, bearded and penduline tit. In the autumn and spring, thousands of individual migratory birds use the area as a resting, roosting and feeding area. White-tailed eagle, crane and otter also occur in the area. The nature reserve is used by fish as a spawning ground.

== Literature ==
- Umweltministerium Mecklenburg-Vorpommern, ed. (2003), "Neuendorfer Wiek mit Insel Beuchel 321", Die Naturschutzgebiete in Mecklenburg-Vorpommern (in German), Schwerin: Demmler-Verlag, pp. 110f, ISBN 3-91-015052-7
