= Kleiner Jasmunder Bodden =

Lagoon in Germany

Coordinates: 54°26′N 13°30′E

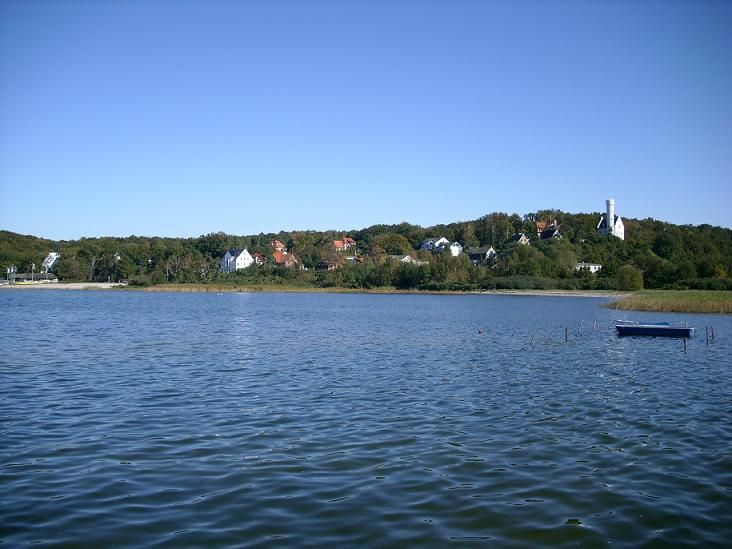
The Kleiner Jasmunder Bodden with Lietzow in the background

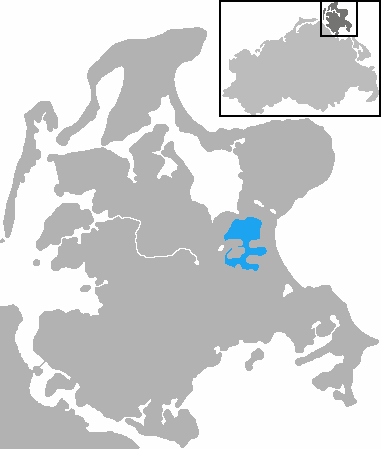
Location of the Kleiner Jasmunder Bodden

The Kleiner Jasmunder Bodden belongs to the North Rügen Bodden and is a water body on the southern edge of the Baltic Sea in the German state of Mecklenburg-Vorpommern.

== Description ==
It is a bodden, a type of lagoon that occurs in northern Europe especially on the coast of Pomerania. It is around seven kilometres long and five kilometres across at its widest point, but in places it is considerably narrower. It has an area of 28.4 square kilometres.

== Geography ==
The lagoon is bounded to the north by the Jasmund peninsula, to the east by the spit of the Schmale Heide and to the south by the main body of the island of Rügen, the Muttland. To the northwest near Lietzow it is linked to the Großer Jasmunder Bodden by a ditch and sluice gate. The two bodden were first separated in 1869 by the construction of an embankment that now carries the B 96 federal road and the Stralsund–Sassnitz railway. This embankment turned the bodden more or less into a lake. The shore of the bodden is quite indented: for example, the Pulitz peninsula juts out well into the bodden. This is designated as a nature reserve.

== Environment ==
The water of the Kleiner Jasmunder Bodden contains very little salt because it has no direct link to the Baltic Sea. The canal to the Großer Jasmunder Bodden, which only has a salt content of 0.6 to 0.7 per cent itself, is too small to deliver salt continuously. The bodden is rich in fish. Its water quality is poor, however, due to discharges from the sewage works at Bergen and eutrophication is well advanced. However, an improvement in water quality is still being sought. The moor area of the Ossen lowland near Buschvitz was renatured and an open connection created between the Ossen and the Kleiner Jasmunder Bodden. The dam to the Great Jasmunder Bodden and the dam between Stedar and the Pulitz peninsula are also to be opened.

By the Kleiner Jasmunder Bodden is a 9.8 kilometre long circular walk that starts at Lietzow. The trail is classed as moderate and is used by hikers, runners and ornithologists.

=== Important Bird Area ===
The bodden has been designated an Important Bird Area (IBA) by BirdLife International because it supports large numbers of wintering waterfowl as well as breeding sandwich terns and white-tailed sea-eagles.
