= Großer Jasmunder Bodden =

Lagoon in Germany

Coordinates: 54°31′14″N 13°27′53″E

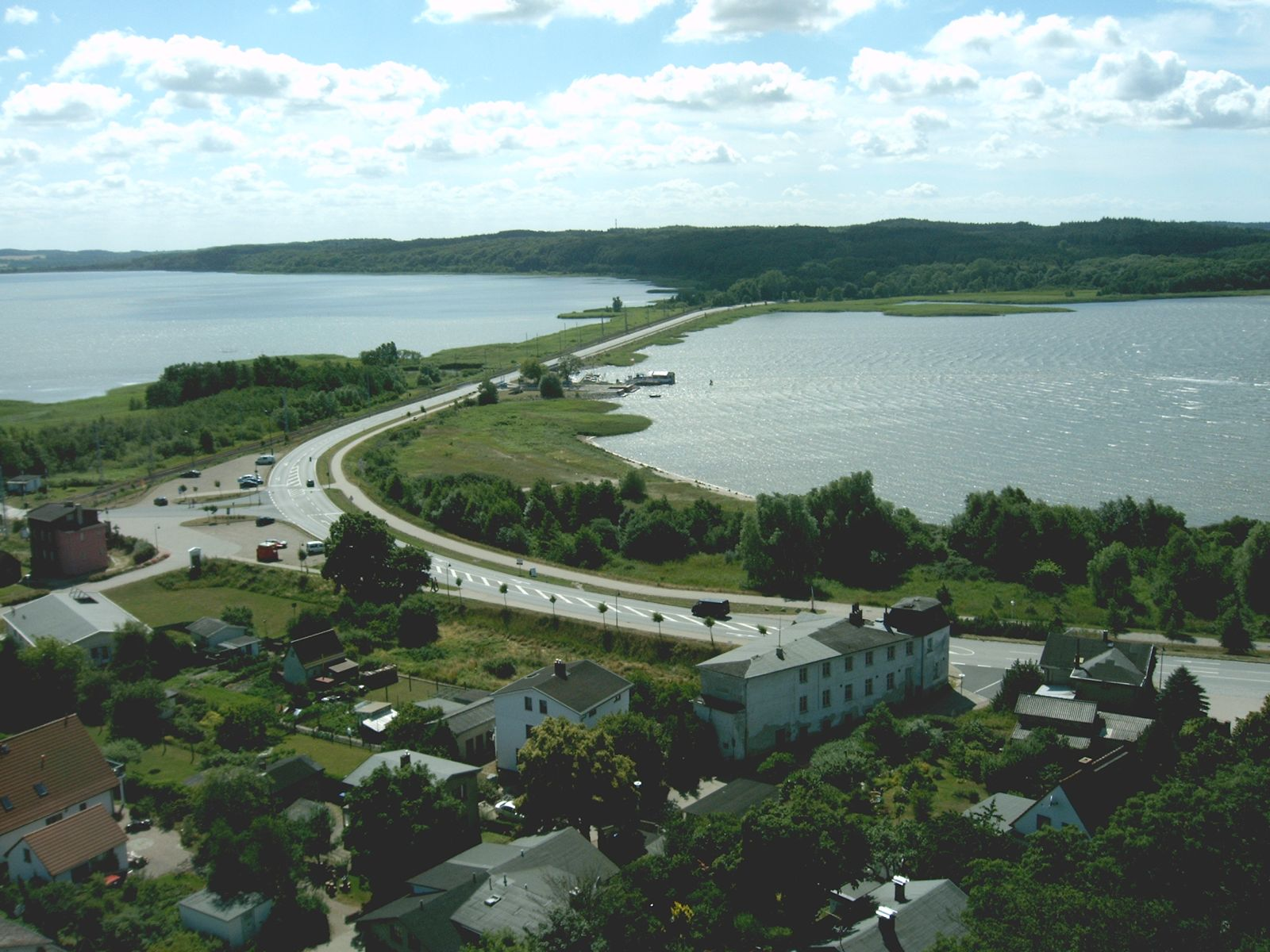
View of the isthmus between the Kleiner (left) and Großer Jasmunder Bodden south of Lietzow

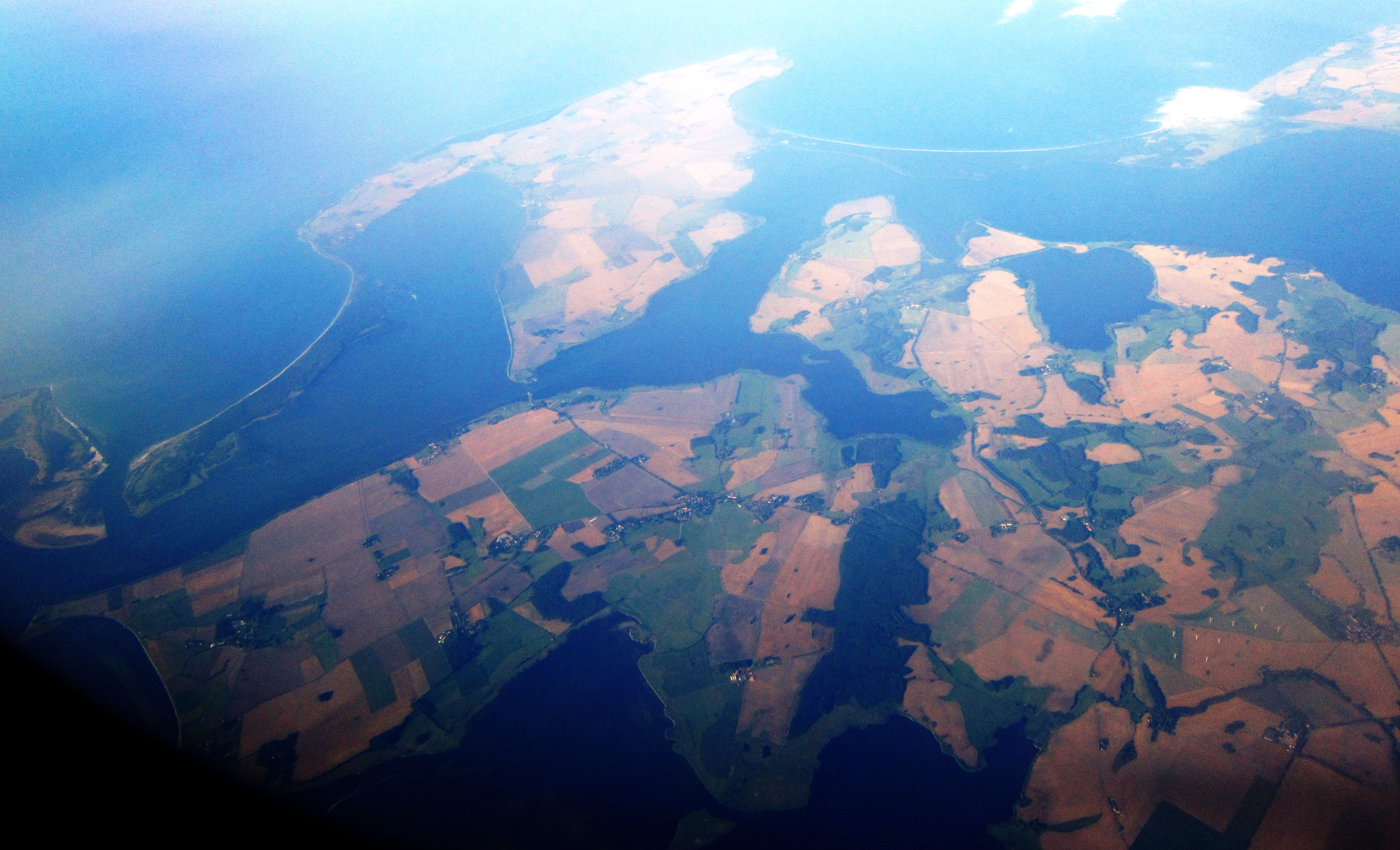
Großer Jasmunder Bodden separating Wittow & Schaabe (top) from Muttland (bottom)

The Großer Jasmunder Bodden belongs to the Northern Rügener Boddens and is a water body on the southern edge of the Baltic Sea in the German state of Mecklenburg-Vorpommern.

== Description ==
It is a bodden, a type of lagoon that occurs in northern Europe especially on the coast of Pomerania. It lies within the island of Rügen, is around 14 kilometres long, an average of six kilometres wide and is up to nine metres deep with an average depth of 5.3m. The Großer Jasmunder Bodden has an area of 58.6 square kilometres; if the Breetzer Bodden, Breeger Bodden, Lebbiner Bodden, Neuendorfer Wiek and Tetzitzer See are included the total area of water comes to over 94 square kilometres.

== Geography ==
The bodden is bounded to the north by the peninsulas of Wittow and Jasmund, which are linked by the narrow spit of Schaabe. To the south of the bodden is the main body of the island of Rügen, Muttland. To the east near Lietzow it is linked to the Kleiner Jasmunder Bodden by a ditch and sluice gate. The two bodden were first separated in 1869 by the construction of an embankment that now carries the B 96 federal road and the Stralsund–Sassnitz railway. In the west at the Wittow Ferry the bodden has a narrow branch running into the lagoon of Rassower Strom and is thereby linked to the Baltic Sea. The western part of the bodden is further sub-divided into the Breetzer Bodden, Breeger Bodden and Lebbiner Bodden, which, strictly speaking, are not part of the Großer Jasmunder Bodden. The north of the bodden is less divided. Only the Spykersche See near Spyker pushes east forming a small bay. By contrast the southwestern shore is more indented, with the Tetzitzer See and the Neuendorfer Wiek pushing well inland. The extreme southeastern shore of the bodden near Ralswiek is the venue for the Störtebeker Festival that takes place every summer.

== Environment ==
The water of the Großer Jasmunder Bodden is a mix of fresh water from the streams that discharge into it and the salty waters of the Baltic and is classed as brackish water with a salt content of 0.7 to 0.8 per cent. Almost the entire shore is girt with reeds. In places the shoreline forms sea cliffs that were formed thousands of years ago by breakers in the Littorina Sea, when the islands of Wittow and Jasmund were still not linked by the Schaabe.

The bodden is rich in fish and is also used for bathing and sailing. There are important harbours in Ralswiek, Polchow, Breege and St. Martin's Harbour in Sagard.

=== Important Bird Area ===
The bodden has been designated an Important Bird Area (IBA) by BirdLife International because it supports large numbers of wintering waterfowl as well as breeding sandwich terns and white-tailed sea-eagles.

== Sub-divisions ==
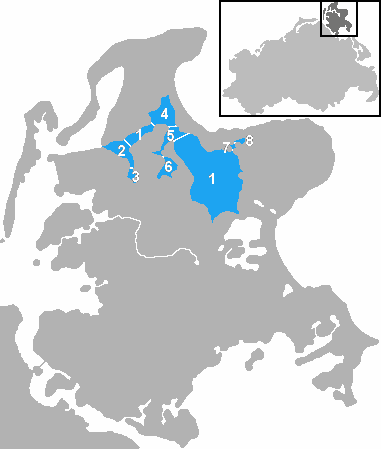
Location and sub-divisions of the Großer Jasmunder Bodden

1. Großer Jasmunder Bodden
2. Breetzer Bodden
3. Neuendorfer Wiek
4. Breeger Bodden
5. Lebbiner Bodden
6. Tetzitzer See
7. Mittelsee
8. Spykerscher See

== Literature ==
- Schiewer, Ulrich (2008). Ecology of Baltic coastal waters. Berlin: Springer. ISBN 978-3-540-73524-3. OCLC 233973310.
