= Wieker Bodden =

Lagoon in the Baltic Sea

Coordinates: 54°36′N 13°15′E

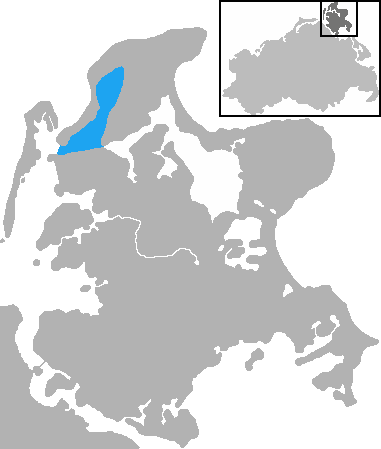
Location of the Wieker Bodden near Rügen

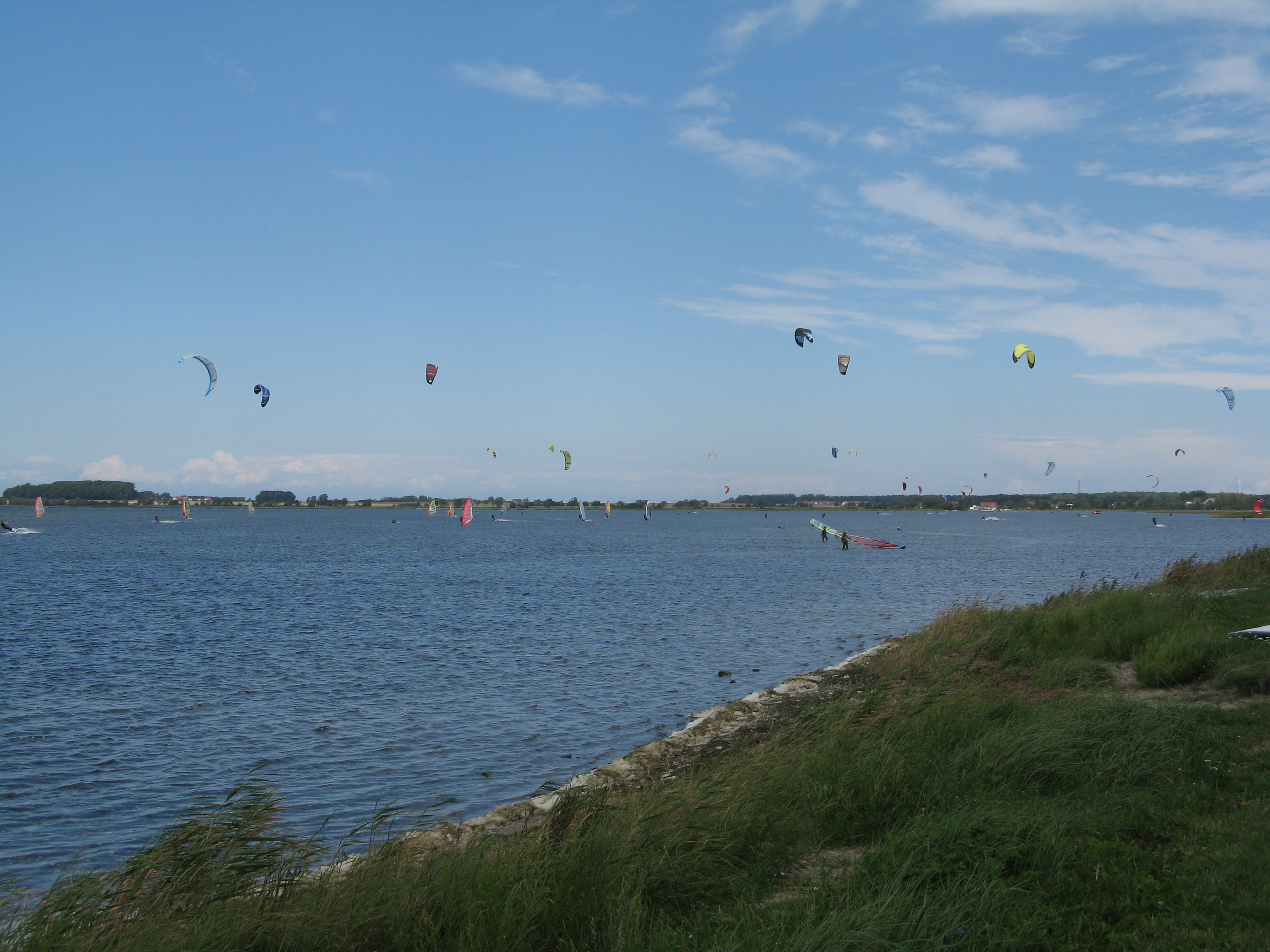
Surfers on the Wieker Bodden near Wiek

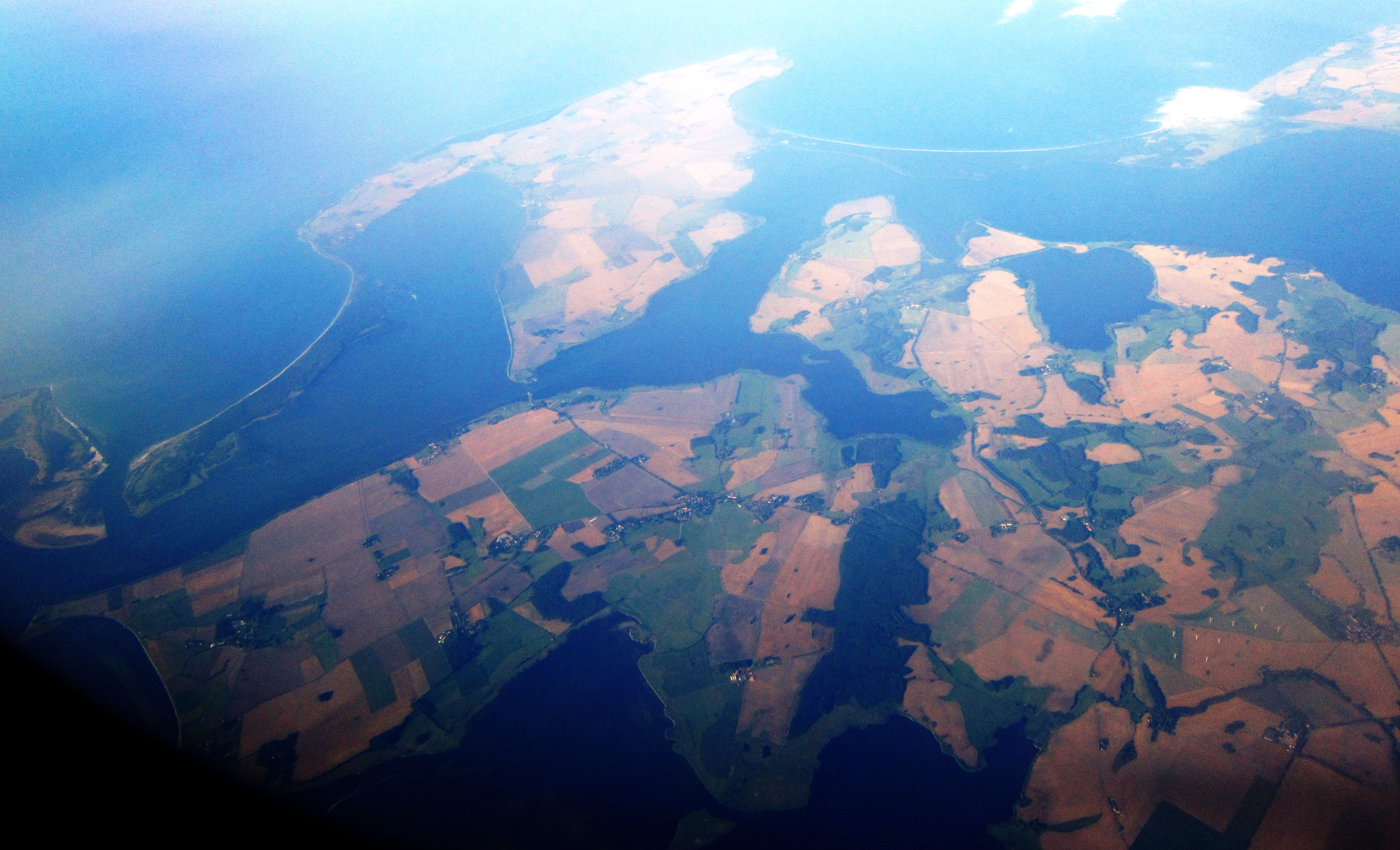
Wieker Bodden is the big lagoon in the left-hand side

The Wieker Bodden is a lagoon or bodden, that is largely surrounded by the German Baltic Sea island of Rügen. It is part of the North Rügen Bodden Chain.

== Location ==
The Wieker Bodden lies between the peninsula of Bug to the west and the main section of the peninsula of Wittow to the north and east. In the south the bodden is bounded by the Rassower Strom, which forms a link from the Vitter Bodden in the west to the Großer Jasmunder Bodden in the east.

== Neighbouring municipalities ==
The bodden gets its name from the village of Wiek on its perimeter. Apart from Wiek the larger village of Dranske also lies on the Wieker Bodden.

== Loading ramp at Wiek ==
In Wiek the construction of a loading bridge was started before the First World War for the shipping from Kreide. The bridge is still there today, albeit in a state of decay.

== Surfing ==
In the northern part of the bodden it is very shallow and thus very popular with windsurfers and kitesurfers.
