= Spyckerscher See and Mittelsee Nature Reserve =

Nature reserve in Mecklenburg-Vorpommern, Germany

Coordinates: 54.55892°N 13.49087°E

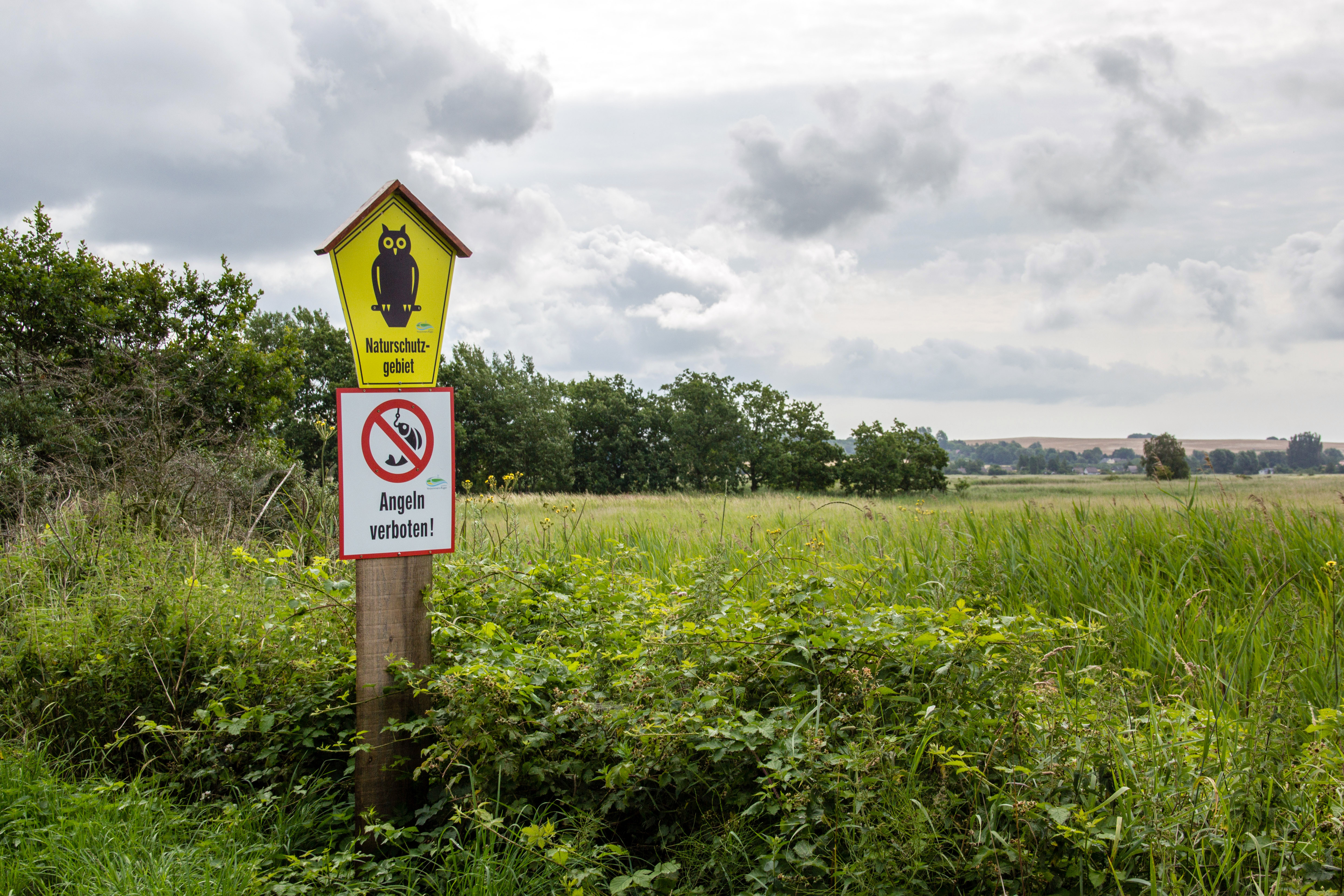
Spyckerscher See and Mittelsee Nature Reserve in 2016

The Spyckerscher See and Mittelsee Nature Reserve (German: Naturschutzgebiet Spyckerscher See und Mittelsee) is a nature reserve in the German state of Mecklenburg-Vorpommern. It includes the two lakes named as well as the adjacent shore and shallow water areas, covering a total area of 344 hectares. It was designated as a reserve on 5 November 1990 and expanded in 1994. Neighbouring villages are Glowe in the northwest and Spyker in the east. Its conservation aim is the preservation of a very attractive section of the North Rügen Bodden, a lagoon landscape which is a habitat for numerous animal and plant species.

The reserve borders immediately on the Großer Jasmunder Bodden.

The reserve is protected under EU law as part of the Nordrügensche Boddenlandschaft Special Area of Conservation and the Binnenbodden von Rügen Special Protection Area

The reserve is in good condition thanks to the cessation of human activities. Only anglers and surfers use the area. The reserve is owned by the state's Foundation for the Environment and Conservation.

A footpath runs through the area.

== Literature ==
- Umweltministerium Mecklenburg-Vorpommern, ed. (2003), "Spyckerscher See und Mittelsee 256", Die Naturschutzgebiete in Mecklenburg-Vorpommern (in German), Schwerin: Demmler-Verlag, pp. 120f, ISBN 3-91-015052-7
