= Schaabe =

Geological feature in Germany

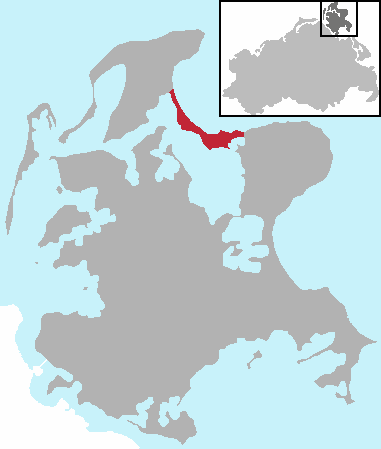
Location of the Schaabe

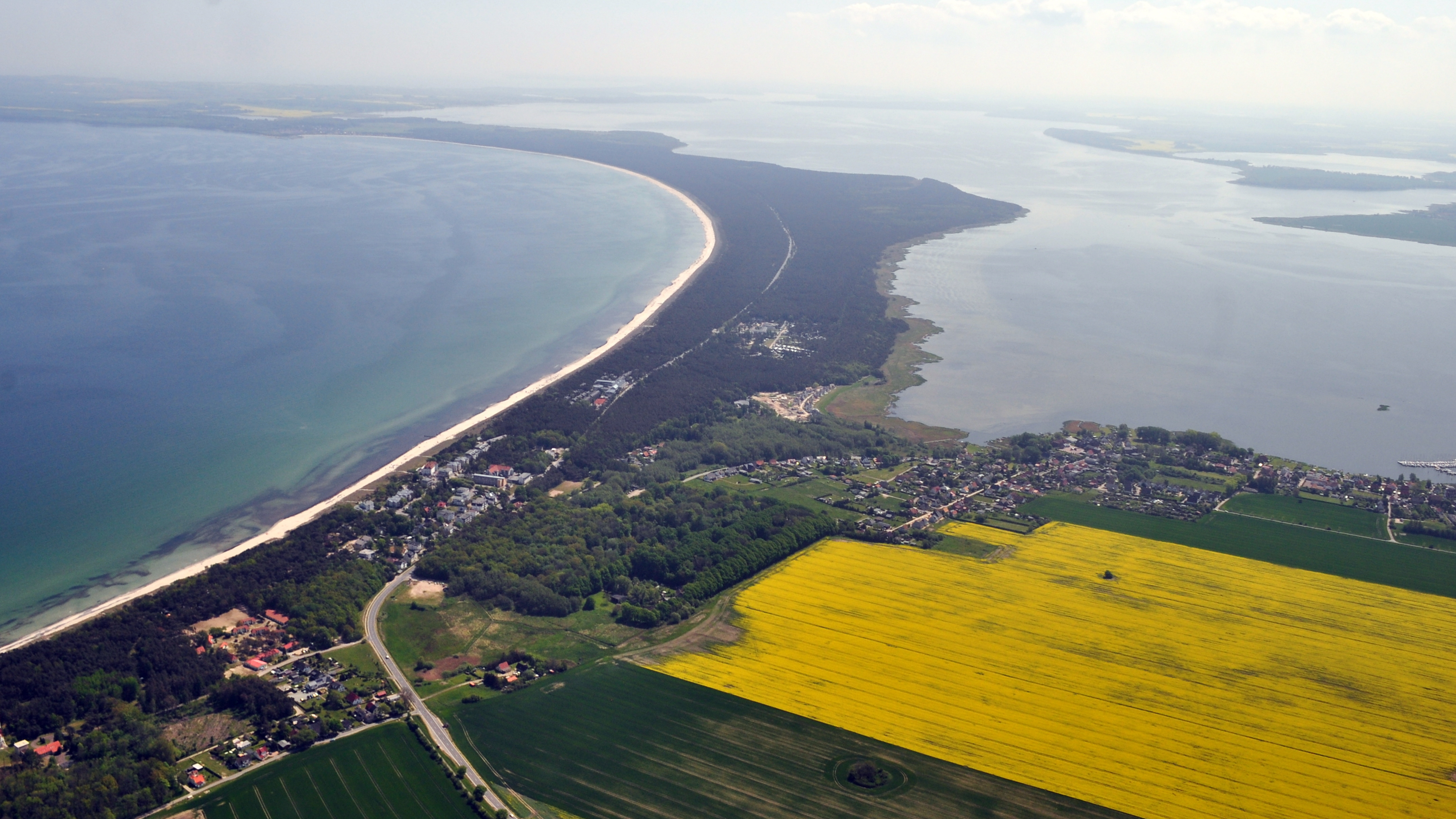
The Schaabe (2011)

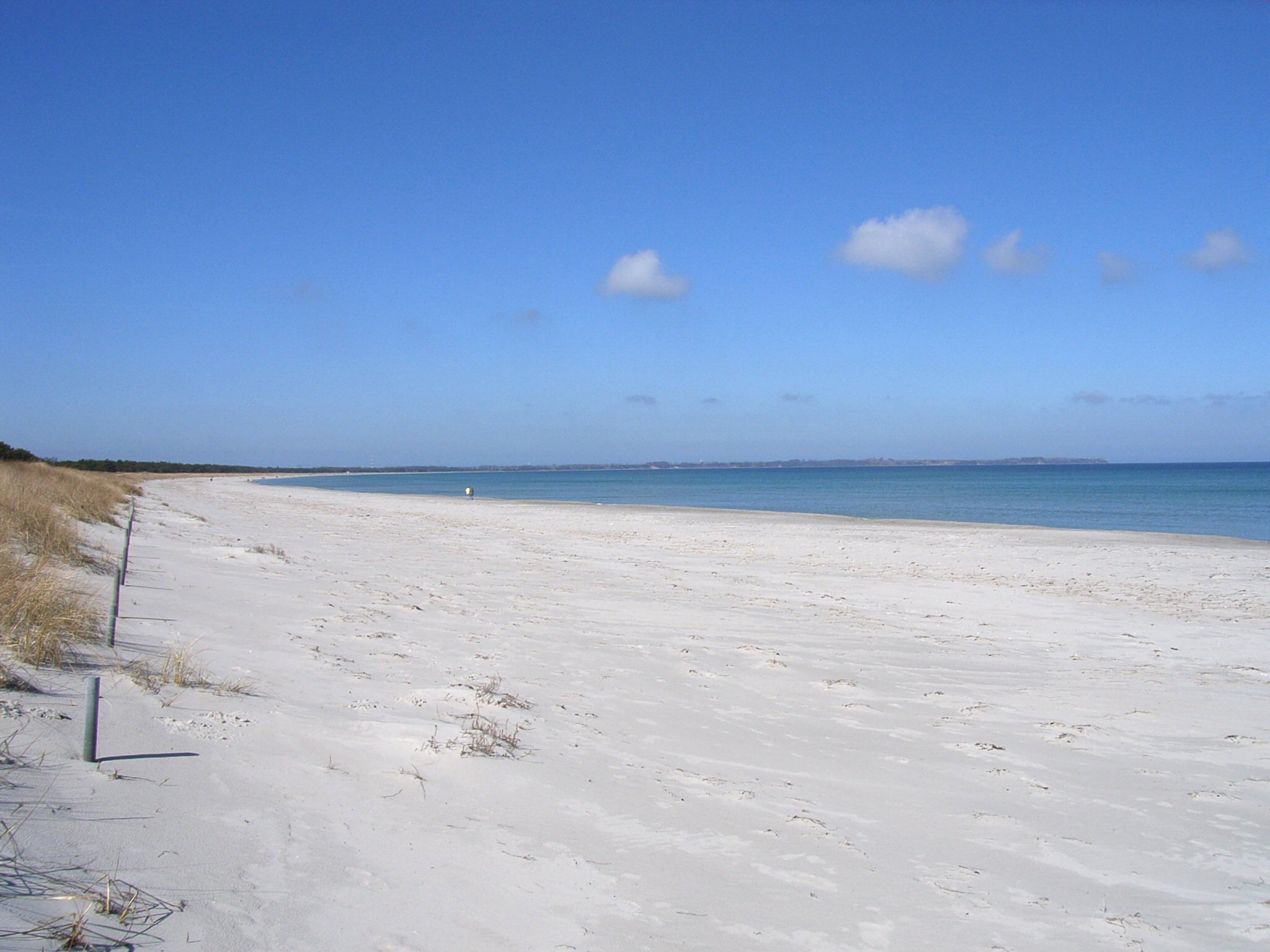
Sandy beach on the Schaabe

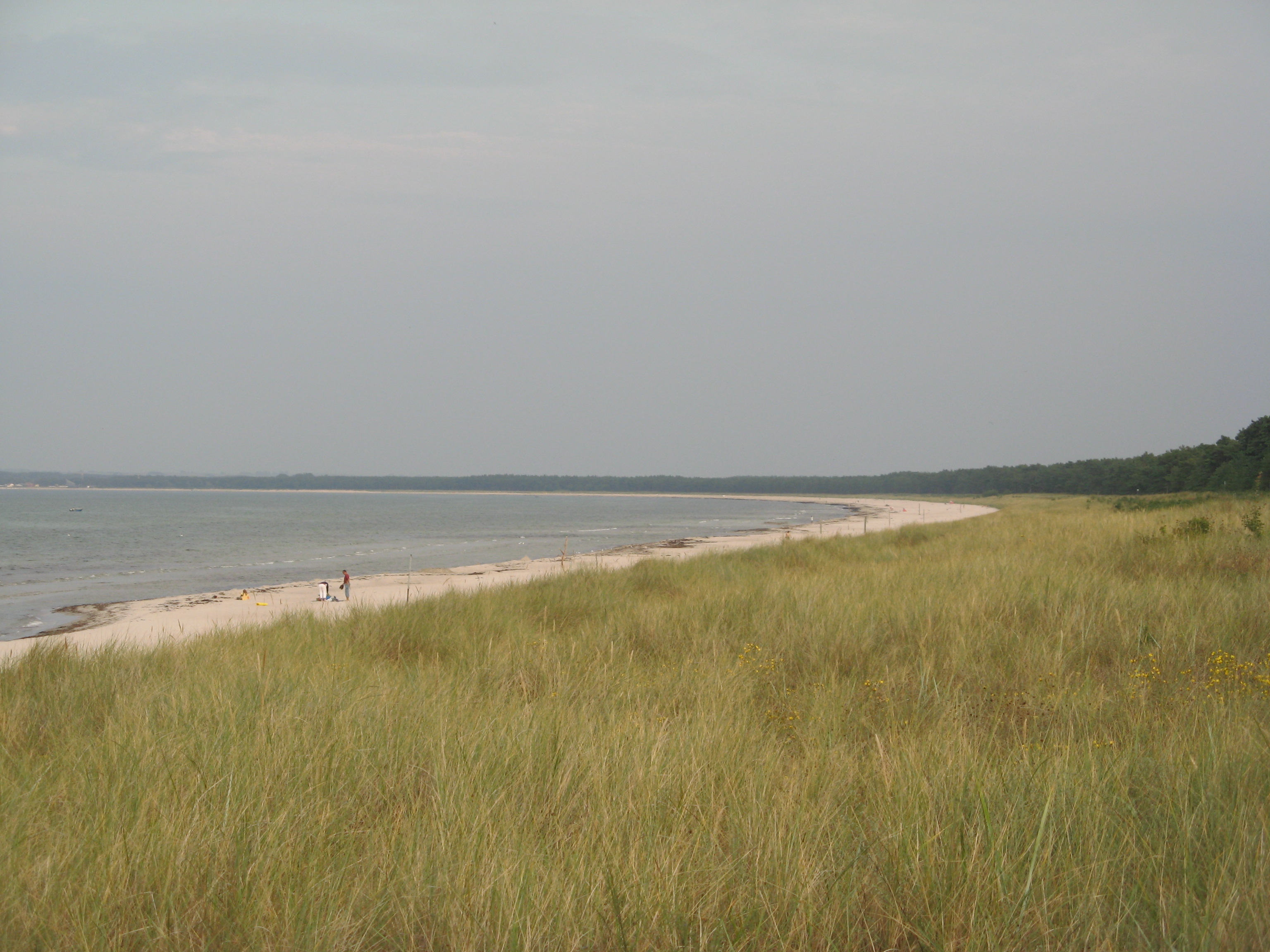
Sandy beach with dunes

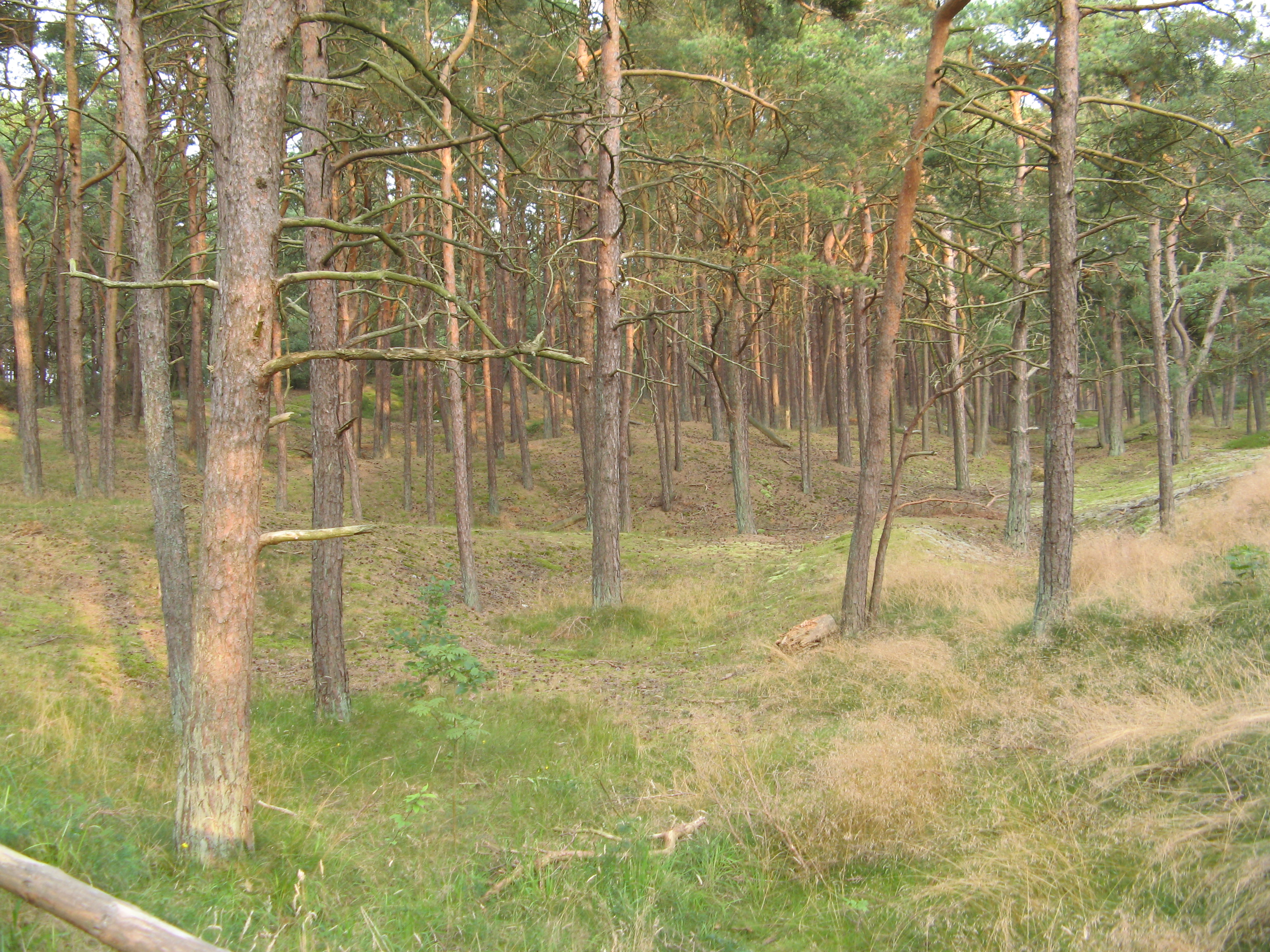
Coastal defence wood behind the beach

The Schaabe (German pronunciation: [ˈʃaːbə]) is a bar, almost twelve kilometres long, on the German Baltic Sea island of Rügen. It joins the peninsulas of Jasmund and Wittow.

Washed up and shaped by the sea, it forms a sickle-shaped shoreline on the bay of Tromper Wiek and separates the lagoons of the Großer Jasmunder Bodden and Breeger Bodden from the Baltic. The fine, washed up sand forms a giant natural bathing bay, that is bordered by the villages of Glowe and Juliusruh (a village in the municipality of Breege).

Unlike the second largest bar on the island of Rügen, the Schmale Heide between Jasmund and the Granitz, which is dominated by the construction of the former Nazi "Strength Through Joy" resort of Prora and decades of military use and its associated infrastructure, the Schaabe between Glowe and Juliusruh is undeveloped apart from a managed forest, the only through road and its accompanying cycle path.

== Formation ==
The Schaabe began to form about 4,500 years ago, when Rügen was still an island archipelago. Only the island cores, especially Wittow and Jasmund jutted out from the sea. As a result of the power of waves combined with a sustained uplift, the coasts of these island cores were gradually eroded and the sediment, carried by ocean currents, was deposited to form spits. This process continues today.

From archaeological finds it is known that the southern part of the Schaabe in the area of the present day Glowe first silted up at the time of the early Slavic settlements, that is in the 7th or 8th centuries. This also meant that sailors from the then major Slavic settlement near the present-day Ralswiek - at the transition between the Großer and Kleiner Jasmunder Bodden lagoons - had a much shorter access route to the open sea.

Similar to the flint fields in the northern part of the Schmale Heide, but much smaller in size, are ridges of flint at many places in the northern part of Schaabe behind the main line of sand dunes, which were thrown up here by the waves in earlier times, when the sea level was higher. This proves that the erosion and transportation of flints from the chalk cliffs of Wittow and Jasmund has reduced over the centuries and been replaced by the deposition of fine beach sand.

== Today ==
Behind the wide white beach a ten-kilometre-long and up to seven-metre-high coastal defence dune barrier protects the hinterland from storm floods. The dunes are stabilised by the painstaking planting of beach grass (Ammophila arenaria), which counteracts erosion by wind and waves and promotes height growth. Behind the main dunes is an area of low, hummocky dunes (one to five metres above NN), which were planted in 1866, 1881, 1901, 1952 and most recently in 1957 with pine (European Black Pine), Birch, Sessile oak and English oak. This coastal protection forest has an area of 168 hectares and extends southwest to the shore of the lagoon. Before it was afforested, the Schaabe had been known for centuries as the Schmale Wittower Heide ("Narrow Wittow Heath").

Due to the different soil moisture on the wiek (bay) and bodden (lagoon) sides of the Schaabe the vegetation is different on each side.
