= Vitter Bodden =

Lagoon in Germany

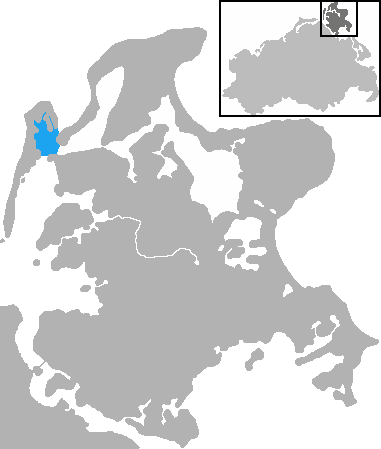
The Vitter Bodden

The Vitter Bodden is a type of lagoon called a bodden between the northern part of the island of Hiddensee (with the Neubessin and Altbessin peninsulas) to the west and north and the peninsula of Bug, the Wieker Bodden and the northern part of the Schaprode peninsula to the east. In the north the bodden borders on the Bay of Libben on the open Baltic Sea and in the south on the Schaproder Bodden. It is one of the West Rügen Bodden.

The bodden was named after Vitte, the main settlement on the shores of the bodden on Hiddensee. The bodden is part of the Western Pomerania Lagoon Area National Park. The Vitter Bodden is very shallow throughout (generally below 1.5 metres in depth), only the navigable channel and an area in the middle are over 2 metres deep. In the northwest the bodden is very shallow and peters out into a windwatt (wind-exposed mudflat) in front of Hiddensee. In this area the two peninsulas of Neubessin and Altbessin are steadily growing into the bodden as a result of sand masses washed along from the north of the island.
