= Jasmund =

Peninsula of Germany

Coordinates: 54.53°N 13.59°E

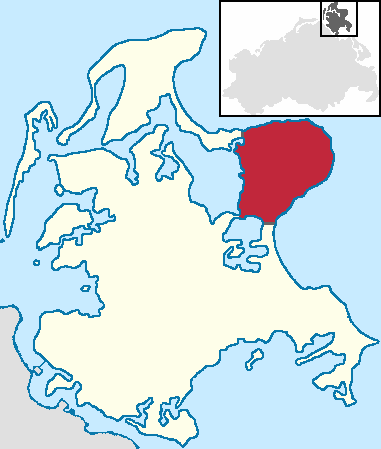
The location of the peninsula within Rügen.

Jasmund (German pronunciation: [ˈjasmʊnt]) is a peninsula of the island of Rügen in Mecklenburg-Vorpommern, Germany. It is connected to the Wittow peninsula and to the Muttland main section of Rügen by the narrow land bridges Schaabe and Schmale Heide, respectively. Sassnitz, Sagard and the Mukran international ferry terminal are on Jasmund. Jasmund is also famous for the Rügen Chalk cliffs within the Jasmund National Park, a nature reserve in the northeast of Rügen island.

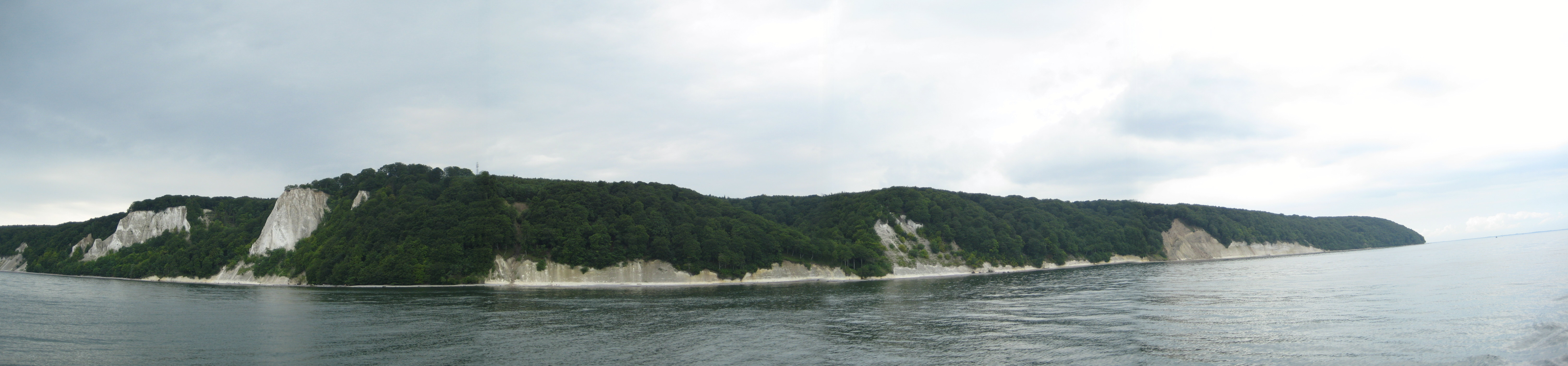
Jasmund National Park chalk cliffs

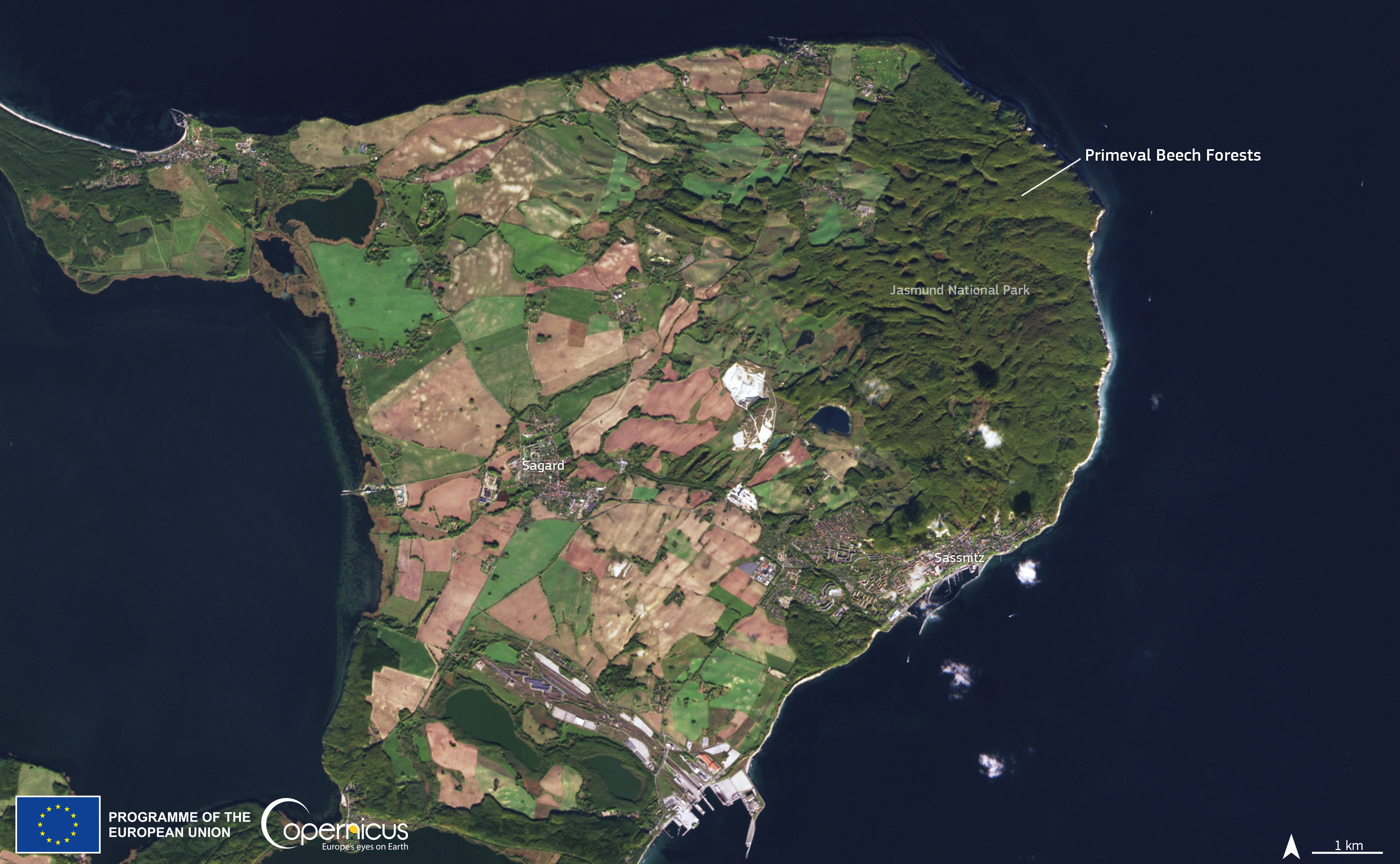
A Sentinel-2 satellite image of the peninsula
