= Muttland =

Area of the German island of Rügen

Coordinates: 54°23′33.19″N 13°20′44.31″E

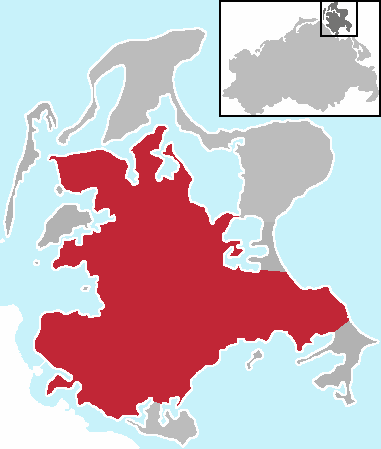
Muttland (red)

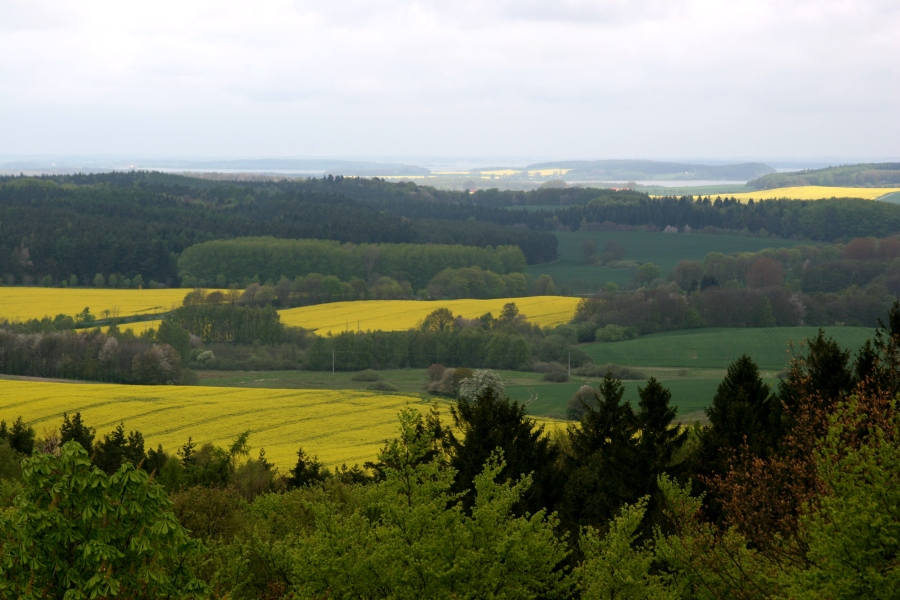
Panorama from Rugardturm (Bergen) to the northeast

Muttland (German pronunciation: [ˈmʊtlant]) comprises the main section of the German island of Rügen, excluding the Rugian peninsulae and small surrounding islands.

The predominant land use is agriculture. Grasslands are found in very small proportions. There are nature conservation areas in the south, which are reported as a resting place for migratory birds. Larger towns are Bergen auf Rügen, Garz and Putbus.
