= Wittow =

Peninsula on island of Rügen

Coordinates: 54°38′N 13°20′E

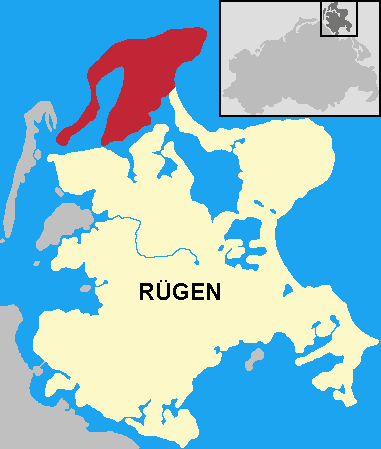
Wittow (red)

Wittow (German pronunciation: [ˈvɪtoː]) is the northernmost peninsula of the island of Rügen. Wittow was a separate island until the High Middle Ages, but since then has been connected to the Jasmund peninsula of Rügen by the Schaabe spit. Wittow is most famous for Cape Arkona hosting the remnants of a former Rani temple burgh. It was also known as 'Wittmund' or 'Witmond' in the 1700s.
