= Ruegen (disambiguation) =

Ruegen (Rügen) is a German island off the Pomeranian coast in the Baltic Sea. Ruegen, Rugen, Rügen, Rᵫgen, or variation, may also refer to:

== Places ==
- Principality of Rügen, a principality of the Holy Roman Empire, based around the island
  - Duchy of Rugen, a duchy of the Kingdom of Denmark, predecessor to the principality
- Rügen (district), a former district of Germany based around the island, successor to the principality
  - Vorpommern-Rügen, a district of Germany, successor to the district of Rugen
    - Vorpommern-Rügen – Vorpommern-Greifswald I, an electoral district of Germany
    - Stralsund – Nordvorpommern – Rügen (electoral district), an electoral district of Germany
    - Nord-Rügen
    - West-Rügen
- Rügen Chalk (Ruegen Formation), a white chalk geologic formation in Germany

== Military ==
- Operation Rügen, code name for the 1937 bombing of Guernica during the Spanish Civil War
- Wars of the Rügen Succession (14th century)
- Battle of Rügen (disambiguation)

== Other uses ==
- Strelasund Crossing, or Rügen Bridge, the bridge from the mainland to Rügen island
- Tyrone Rugen, a fictional character from The Princess Bride

== See also ==
- Rugia (disambiguation)
- Rugii
- Rugiland
- Regen (disambiguation)
