= Rugia (disambiguation) =

Rugia (island) (German: Rügen) is a German island off the Pomeranian coast in the Baltic Sea, variously called Rugia, Ruegen, Rugen, Rügen in English.

Rugia may also refer to:

- Rugia (district), a former district including Rugia island
- Rugia (duchy) (later Principality), a duchy and then principality located around the island
- Rugia Bridge or Strelasund Crossing, a bridge from the mainland to Rugia island
- Rugia (Pokémon) (Japanese: ルギア), a type of Pokemon

== See also ==
- Rugiland
- Rugii
- Rugi (disambiguation)
- Ruga (disambiguation)
