= Rügen chalk =

Stratigraphic unit and rock type in Germany

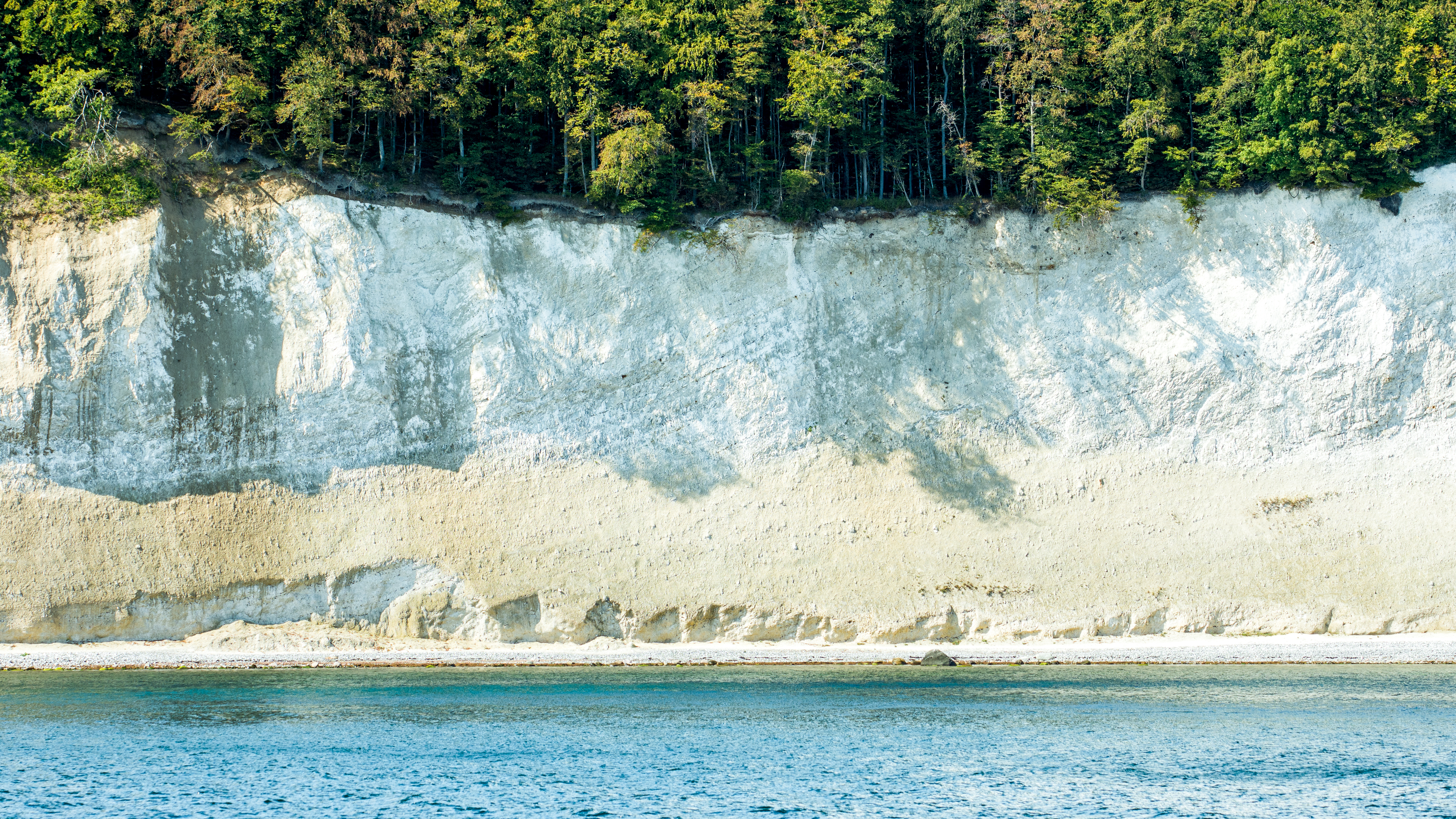
Outcrop of Rügen Chalk in Nationalpark Jasmund

Rügen chalk (German: Rügener Kreide or Rügener Schreibkreide) is the common name for a fine-grained, white, crumbly and highly porous chalk. It forms the highest member of the German Upper Cretaceous, and is of Maastrichtian age. It is found exposed in cliffs on the coast of the Jasmund peninsula in the island of Rügen in Mecklenburg-Vorpommern.

== Features ==
Chalk limestones are often layered, unlike the Rügen chalk. The rock is extremely fine grained with very low cementation, which is associated with a high porosity. While dry Rügen chalk is relatively crumbly but still brittle, water-saturated Rügen chalk is more plastic, similar to moist clay, and can be cut with a knife. Like other limestones of the Upper Cretaceous, the Rügen chalk has a very high content of calcium carbonate (CaCO_{3}). The vast majority of calcium carbonate is in the form of micrometer-sized low-Mg calcite platelets known as coccoliths, which are remnants of unicellular, planktonic calcareous algae known as coccolithophores. The calcareous algae lived around 70 million years ago in light-flooded surface water of a sea that covered northern Germany. After their death, they sank to the bottom of the sea and formed huge deposits of limestone mud over time. This mud would eventually present itself in the form of Rügen chalk.

Another characteristic feature of the Rügen chalk is its high content of flint concretions. These are usually formed as nodules and enriched in individual horizons. Sometimes flat formations of varying thickness can also be found. The particularly large, cylindrical flint concretions are known as "Sassnitz flower pots" (see also → Paramoudra). The silicon dioxide (SiO_{2}) from which the flint stones were formed, originally came from single-celled plankton (radiolarians and diatoms), which lived together with the calcareous algae in the Chalk seas. After the deposition of the coccolith sludge containing radiolaria and diatoms, the SiO_{2} from the plankton dissolved in the water. It circulated in the pore space of the sediment and was again precipitated elsewhere in the sediment. These deposits are seen today as the flint stones.

== Occurrence ==
There are extensive chalk deposits on the northeastern area of Rügen island on the peninsula of Jasmund. Well known deposits include the "Rügener chalk cliffs" of the cliffed coast in the vicinity of Sassnitz (see also → Stubbenkammer, → Königsstuhl). These coastal formations are part of Jasmund National Park and are subject to strict environmental protection. Deposits can also be found within Jasmund's hinterland under a 1 to 10 m thick overburden in the subsoil.

== History ==
=== Companies ===
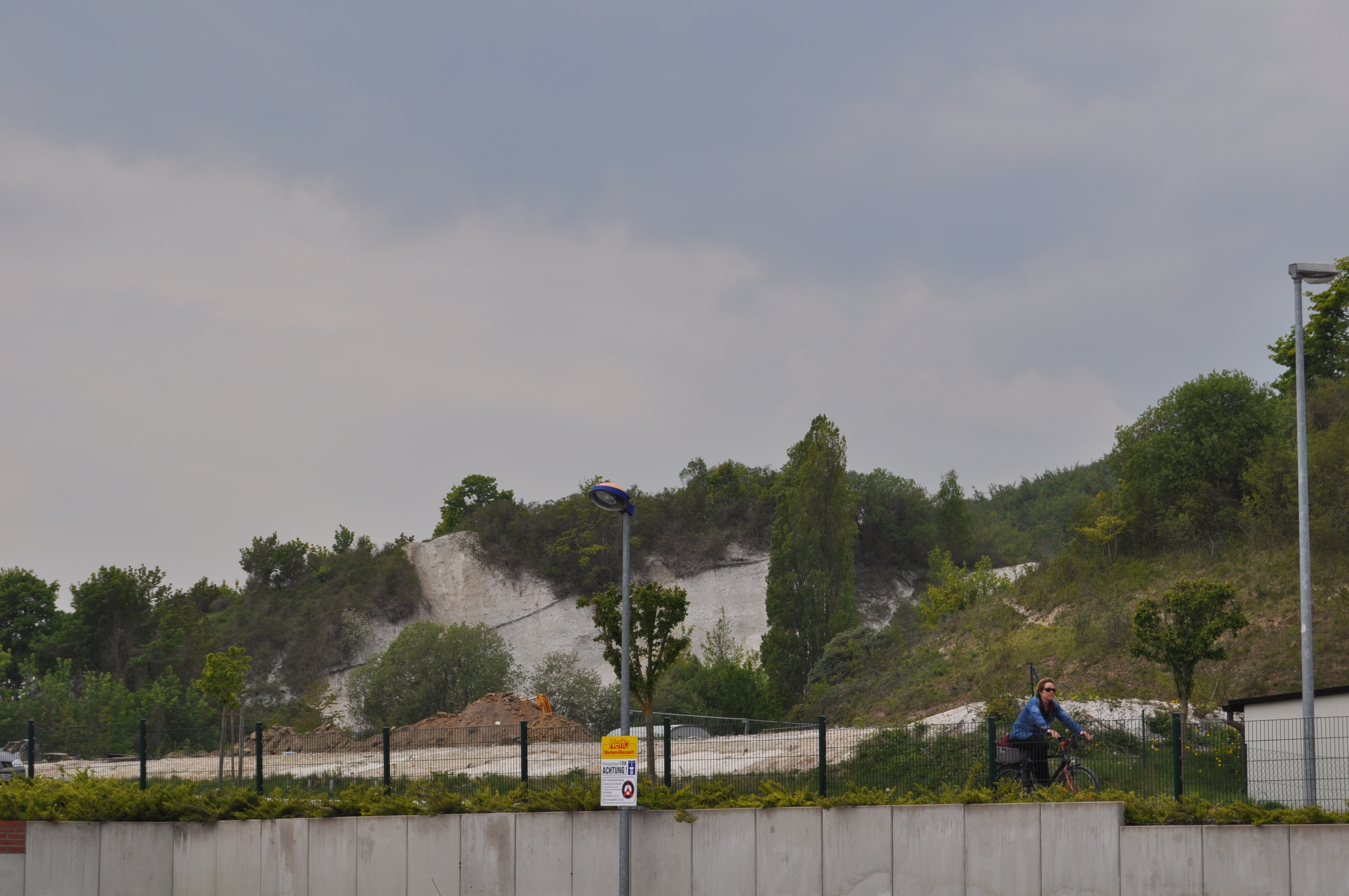
Old chalk quarry in Sassnitz

By 1720, chalk was used in the Granitz for the production of quicklime (CaO). However, the Rügen chalk industry had not began until the first half of the 19th century. It was started by the entrepreneur and naturalist Friedrich von Hagenow (1797-1865). In 1832 he leased the chalk quarries in the Stubnitz and opened a factory in Greifswald. At that time, the raw chalk was delivered by ship from Jasmund to Hagenow's factory. Through a process known as slurrying, the raw chalk was separated from the undesirable rock components such as flint (see above) and finer-grained impurities (known as Grand). The excavation and preparation of the chalk were carried out almost exclusively with strenuous manual labor.

During the late 19th century, the fishing village of Sassnitz slowly developed into a centre of the chalk industry due to the deposits in Jasmund. A fierce competition developed between the individual chalk plants, and Von Hagenow had to give up his business in 1850. As a result, 17 companies with 23 chalk plants merged in 1899 to form a cartel and set limits on all member's production volumes and prices. In 1928, around 500,000 tons of rough chalk from the Jasmund fractures were mined at Großer Jasmunder Bodden and loaded in Sassnitz. With 80,000 tons of capacity however, the mud chalk production of Jasmund only played a minor role at the time. The buyers of raw chalk were mainly the Portland cement plants in Wolgast, Lebbin and Stettin. The other major chalk and cement producer and most important player in the Rügen Chalk Cartel was the Pommersche Industrieverein, founded in 1872 by Johannes Quistorp.

At the end of the Second World War, chalk extraction and processing came to a temporary standstill. Some facilities, including the chalk cable car to Sassnitz harbor, were dismantled and brought to the Soviet Union as war reparations. In addition, the island of Rügen now belonged to the Soviet occupation zone and later to the GDR, meaning private economic structures in the Rügen chalk industry would be eliminated for the next 45 years. Since chalk was soon in demand again as a raw material with the reconstruction, a total of 19 chalk quarries began operations in Rügen after 1945, which were combined into the VEB Vereinigte Kreidewerke Rügen after 1957. With the completion of a large and modern chalk work in Klementelvitz between Sassnitz and Sagard, many other smaller chalk quarries were closed after 1962, and the company was renamed "VEB Kreidewerk Rügen". In 1984, the legal independence of the VEB Kreidewerk Rügen was abolished and it was assigned to the "VEB Zementwerke Rüdersdorf" as Operating Part 6.

=== Extraction ===
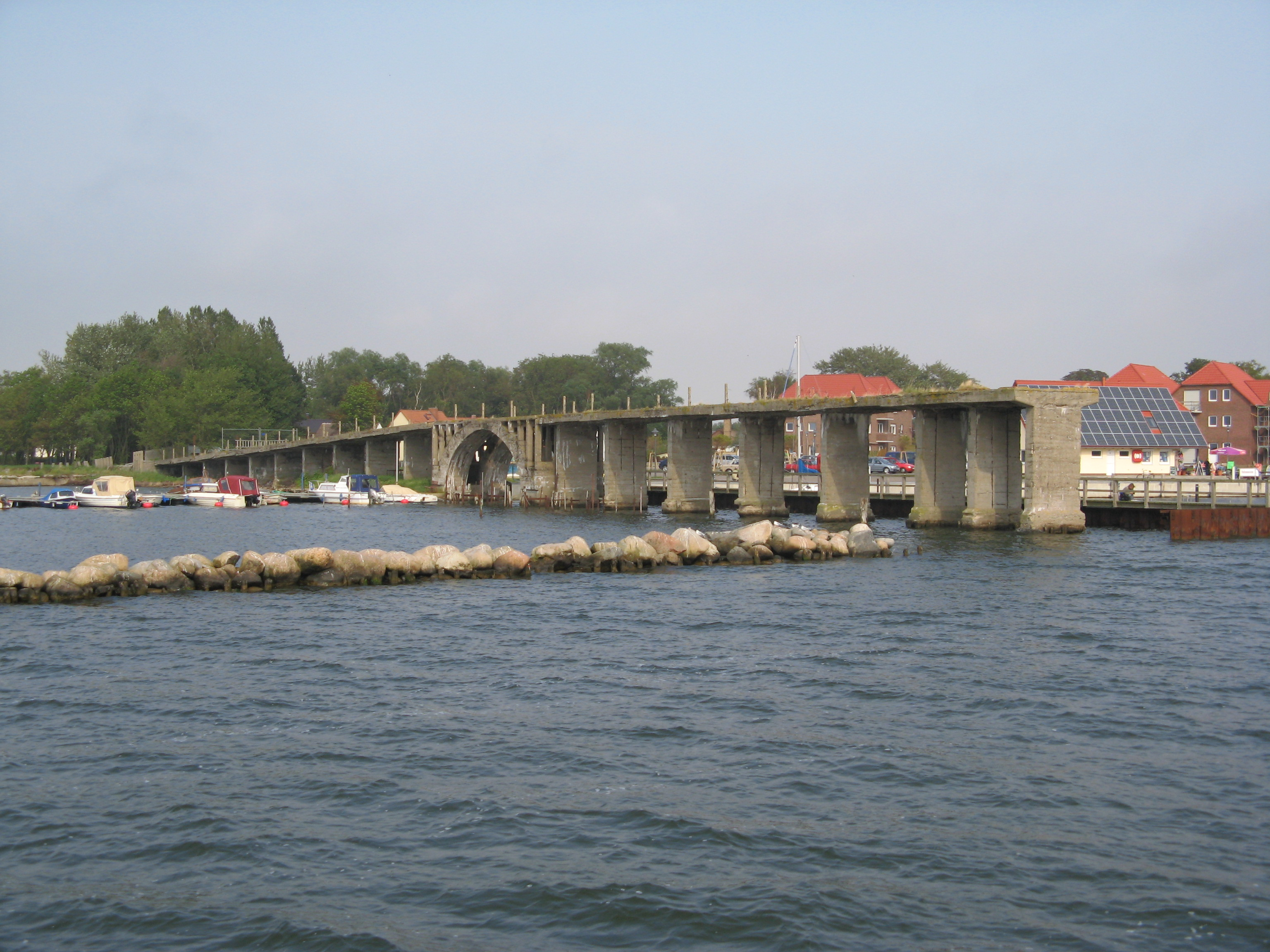
Chalk bridge in the port of Wiek on Rügen before renovation

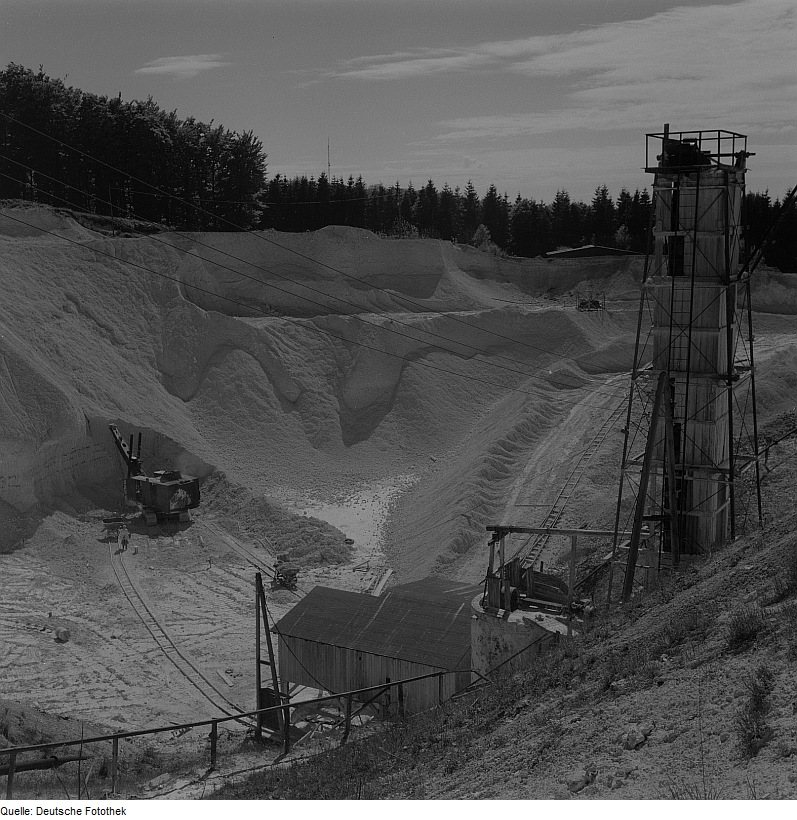
Historical illustration of chalk mining in the Buddenhagen quarry (1963)

In the 19th and early 20th century, the chalk had to be dislodged from a steep mine face with pickaxes and transported on trucks to machines called agitators. In large vats with rotating iron hooks, the chalk was stirred with water. In this step, the coarsest components, mostly flint, were separated. The chalk and water mixture, also called Kreidemilch or Kreidetrübe, was passed through separation tanks where the finer impurities, the Grand, settled out. The chalk suspension freed from the grand then collected in the settling basin, where the still-suspended particles settled out and accumulated into a layer about 30 cm thick. The previously cloudy water was drained, and the basin was filled with fresh chalk suspension, so that the fine particles could settle again. The whole process was repeated until the sediment reached a thickness of approximately 1.5 meters. The finished chalk was left with a water content of 30 to 35%. This heavy mass was then shoveled out of the settling basins into carts. The workers who carried out the steps from dismantling to shoveling were called sludgers. Other workers transported the wet chalk to dry sheds and formed the chalk into shovel-sized masses, then laid them out for drying. The chalk needed to be relayered several times during the dry season for about four weeks. With a residual moisture of approximately 5%, the chalk was ready for shipping at that time.

During the turn of the 20th century, the mining and processing of chalk became increasingly industrialized, which significantly increased the production volume of raw and prepared chalk (known in German as Schlämmkreide). From the Jasmund quarries, the rough chalk came via either a railway line or a cable car to the Port of Sassnitz.

In 1958, in order to increase flow rate and guarantee a consistent quality of the chalk, new technologies were developed and a new chalk plant was constructed in Klementelvitz for 30 million Mark (DDR). The heavy manual labor in the mine was completely replaced by modern conveyors such as the excavator UB 80, a GDR standard excavator of the 1960s and 1970s. With the completion of this plant in 1962, the production time from excavation to shipping was reduced to only 80 minutes.

== Uses ==
Like any other nearly pure limestone, the Rügen chalk can be used for both cement production and the production of agricultural lime. A relatively modern application of limestone is flue-gas desulfurization. Rügen chalk of lower quality is put to this use, especially in coal power plants, the Rostock Power Station and Jänschwalde Power Station. Sulfur oxides (SO_{X}) react with the calcium carbonate to produce gypsum (CaSO_{4}) and carbon dioxide (CO_{2}). While the carbon dioxide escapes into the atmosphere, the gypsum is reused in the construction industry.

Even before 1945, chalk was shipped by train to Berlin, Bremen, Hamburg, Ruhrgebiet, Breslau and Stettin where it was used in the electrical, paint and cosmetics industries. From the 1960s onwards, the VEB Kreidewerk Rügen was supplied with chalk in three grain types – "Malkreide 60", "Feinkreide 40" and "Mikrotherm 20". Under the name "Three Crown Chalk" (trade name of the Swedish Pomeranian era), this was a major export item of the GDR and was delivered to 40 countries. Since 1974, powdered chalk has been processed as a white pigment for the paint "GW 12" in the Quatzendorf sub-plant.

== Bibliography ==
- Heinz Lehmann, Renate Meyer: Rügen A–Z (Arkona – Zudar). Wähmann-Verlag, Schwerin 1976, S. 46
- Mike Reich, Peter Frenzel: Die Fauna und Flora der Rügener Schreibkreide (Maastrichtium, Ostsee). Archiv für Geschiebekunde. Bd. 3, Nr. 2, 2002 (ResearchGate).
