= Königsstuhl National Park Centre =

Königsstuhl National Park Centre (Nationalpark-Zentrum Königsstuhl)
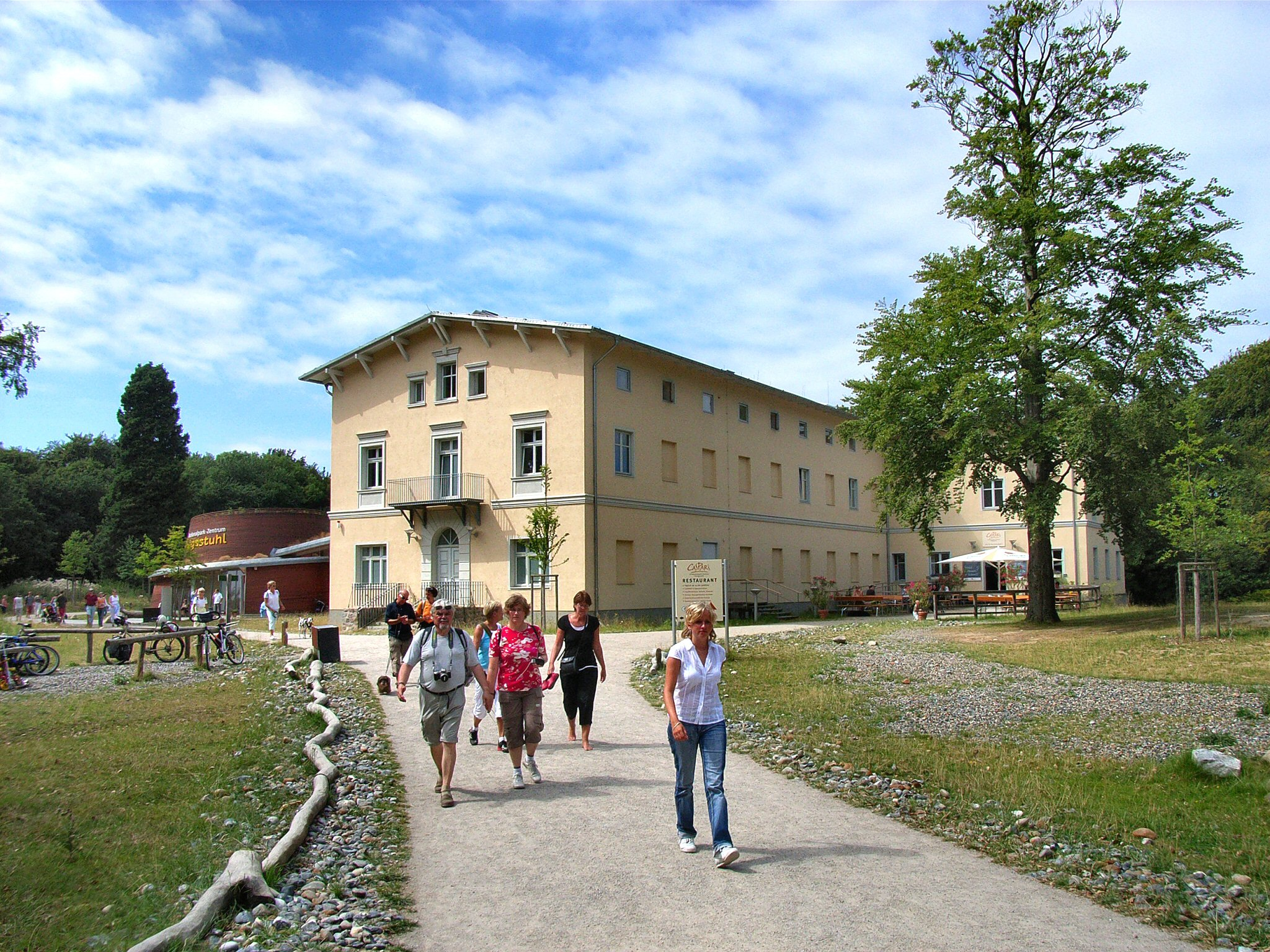
- Königsstuhl National Park Centre
- Established: 2004
- Location: Stubbenkammer 2, 18546 Sassnitz
- Coordinates: 54°33′36″N 13°39′14″E
- Type: National park centre
- Visitors: 313,000
- Website: www.koenigsstuhl.com/deutsch/

The Königsstuhl National Park Centre (German: Nationalpark-Zentrum Königsstuhl) is the visitor centre for the Jasmund National Park on the German Baltic Sea island of Rügen. It was opened in 2004 and, with around 300,000 visitors per year (as of 2008), is one of the most popular national park centres in Germany.

Its aim is to provide information on the unique characteristics of the park while instructing visitors how to avoid damaging the ecology of the park. The centre offers an interactive exhibition, a multi-vision theatre, and other activities in the outdoor area. It is named after the nearby chalk cliffs of Königsstuhl.

The operator of the centre is the Nationalpark-Zentrum Königsstuhl Sassnitz GmbH, whose members are the World Wildlife Fund of Germany and the town of Sassnitz.

== History and creation of the centre ==
Because of the fascination of the imposing chalk rocks in the 19th century, there was an interest in creating visitor facilities in this location. In 1835, an inn was built in a wooden, Swiss style under the direction of Karl Friedrich Schinkel. After this building had burned down and been rebuilt several times, it was decided in 1893 to build a stone hotel which served as an inn and post office. This building still exists today and is part of the National Park Centre.

Around 1943 during the Second World War, the building was used as a hospital. Later, it was occupied by the Red Army. Subsequently, the East German navy (Coastal Border Brigade) also used this building as a barracks. Other bunkers and a guard tower were erected on the site.

In 1990, East Germany's Council of Ministers, declared the area a national park. Until 1999, the area lay fallow and the buildings fell to ruin. In 2000, the guard tower and all barracks except one were demolished. The World Wildlife Fund of Germany, the state of Mecklenburg-West Pomerania, and the town of Sassnitz founded a company, the Stubnitzhaus Sassnitz GmbH, to establish a nature information centre. In March 2004, the Königsstuhl National Park Centre was opened.

== Objective ==
The West Pomerania National Park Authority is responsible for the Jasmund National Park. The staff of the National Park Authority work to protect the park and its visitors; they look after the visitor facilities (paths, steps, etc.) and visitor safety, as well as running environmental education projects. The Königsstuhl National Park Centre works in a complementary fashion to provide information and to engage visitors in the natural beauty of the park. A central focus of the Park Centre is to give visitors the opportunity to experience nature and to enjoy peaceful recreation, without nature suffering as a result.

The Centre pursues a unified approach to environmental protection. Environmental protection is a factor in the recruitment of all staff, and also covers all aspects of the Center, such as its construction materials, the operation of the restaurant, and paper used for print media in the office.

== Visitor services ==
=== Königsstuhl observation platform ===
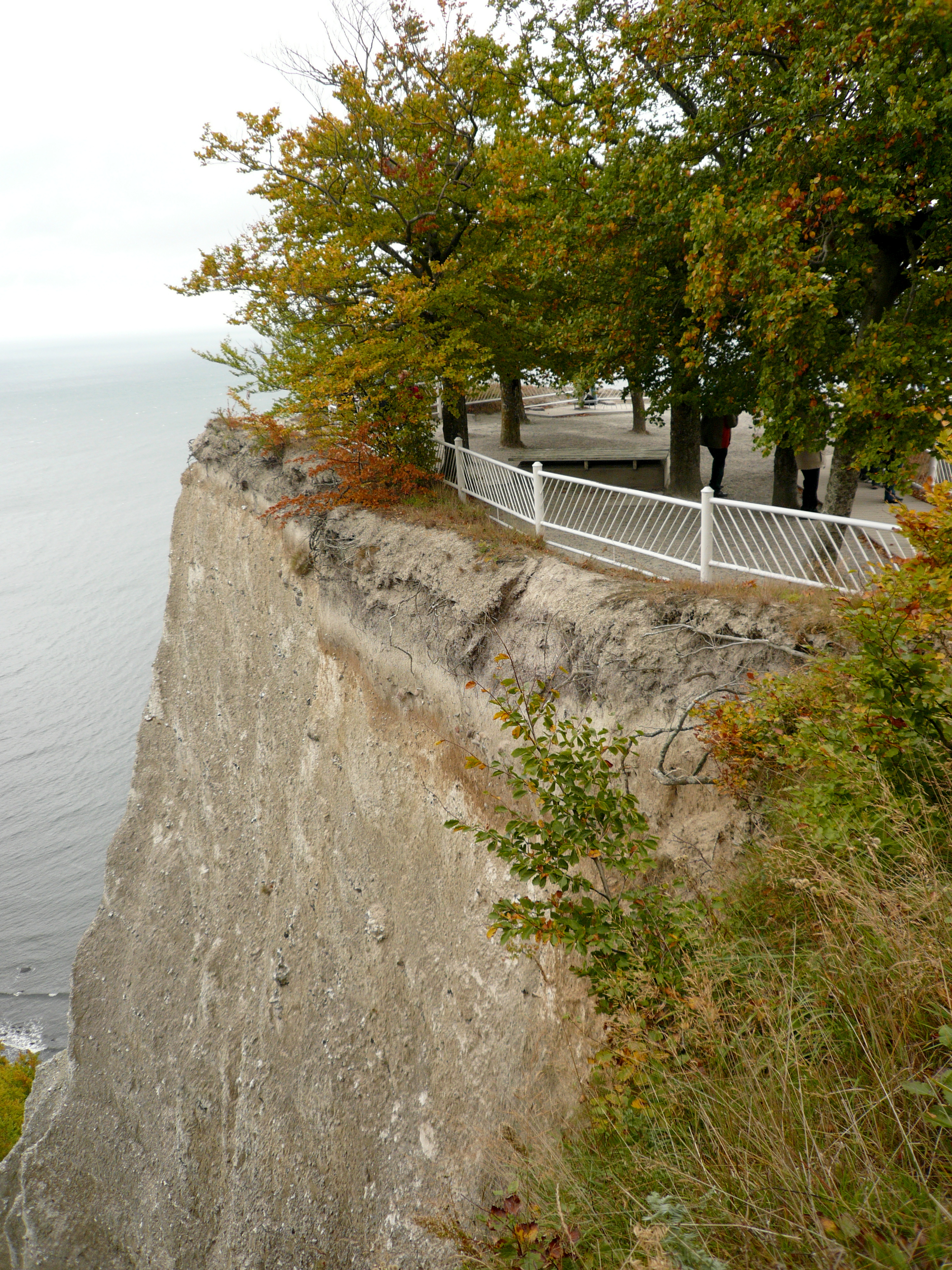
The viewing platform on the Königsstuhl

Within the grounds of the National Park Centre is the Königsstuhl, one of the most impressive cliffs on Rügen's chalk coastline. On the top of the cliff is a viewing platform, accessible via a few steps. Below this platform is a protected passage grave dating from the Bronze Age.

=== Interactive exhibition ===
The 2,000-square-metre exhibition, with its theme of a "journey through time", starts in prehistoric times and has displays such as aquariums and an exhibit of an iceberg glacier.

=== Multivision cinema ===
A 180° film, projected onto four screens, provides a sense of the beauty of Jasmund National Park. Large-format photographs alternate with moving images, and produce a feeling of flying over the park. The actors are children from the island of Rügen. The snail-shaped auditorium seats about 70 visitors. The aim of the film is to raise awareness of Jasmund and the national park concept on an emotional level.

=== Outdoor area ===
An outdoor area of 28,000 square metres provides other attractions for children and adults, such as a climbing forest, a ground-nesting bird's nest with giant eggs, and an exhibition about the painting Chalk Cliffs on Rügen (Kreidefelsen auf Rügen) by the artist Caspar David Friedrich.

=== Walks ===
The park includes hiking trails and cycle paths. The National Park Centre offers free, guided walks. In addition, there are themed walks, which are based on the seasons.

== Special features ==
=== Disabled-friendly ===
The National Park Centre is wheelchair-accessible. Lifts allow disabled and wheelchair access to all rooms of the exhibition, all attractions in the outdoor area are wheelchair-accessible with the exception of the Königsstuhl, and the parking lot shuttle bus is low-platform. For blind visitors, "Jasmund, Chalk Cliffs by the Sea" (Nationalpark Jasmund, Kreidefelsen am Meer) is available in Braille.

One region that is not accessible to wheelchairs is the passage grave. It sites immediately below the steps leading to the viewing platform and cannot be altered because structural changes would jeopardise the historic preservation of the grave.

=== Zero emission concept ===
The National Park Centre Königstuhl was designed as a zero-emission building. Power is supplied by a photovoltaic system. Since the Centre is located in one of the sunniest places in Germany, the plant can produce up to 18 KW. A geothermal system was installed in the outside area of the National Park Centre to use the earth's warmth to extract energy for heating, air conditioning and hot water. New technologies have been utilised to promote the sustainable management of drinking water, and the drainage system is governed by a strict separation of waste water by its degree of pollution. Wastewater is discharged by gravity to a fat separator and then sent for pre-treatment at a sewage treatment plant. The cleaned water meets the standards of the EU Bathing Water Directive, and the purified water is used only for non-drinking purposes, such as flushing toilets.

== Getting there / National park trails ==
The car park for the National Park Centre is at Hagen, which is about 3 miles from the Königsstuhl. Visitors continue to the park by shuttle bus or on a hiking trail. Other car parks are located in Sassnitz am Wedding and at the entrance to National Park next to Stubbenkammerstraße.

The most important public road in the national park runs from Sassnitz via Hagen and Nipmerow to Lohme, and cuts through the park in a north-south direction. This road has a branch near the Hagen Tree House to Stubbenkammer and the National Park Centre. From 9:30 am–6:00 pm, this road is closed to general traffic. It is open only to cyclists, coaches, buses, disabled vehicles, delivery and refuse vehicles, and vehicles of the National Park Service.

There are 4 descents from the clifftop path to the beach: wooden steps on the shore of the Hanke between Lohme and the Königsstuhl, by the Königsstuhl going towards the Victoria viewpoint (closed since the Wissower Klinken collapsed), on the Kieler Ufer, and at the Hengst. There are two other descents on the National Park boundary, one at Sassnitz am Wedding and the other in Lohme.

== Literature ==
- Carsten Hertwig; Ralf Röchert (2004), "Zum Geburtstag am 18. März 2004: Das Nationalpark-Zentrum Königsstuhl auf Rügen öffnet seine Pforten", Nationalpark (in German), no. 123, pp. 42–44
