= Regen (disambiguation) =

Regen is a town in Bavaria, Germany.

Regen may also refer to

- Regen (district) around the town of Regen
- Regen (river) in Germany
- Radio Regen, a radio charity in Manchester, England
- Ivan Regen (1868–1947), biologist
- Regen SW, renewable energy agency in south-west England
- Rain (1929 film), a Dutch short film titled Regen in Dutch
- Short for regeneration, as in:
  - Regenerative braking
  - DPF regen, see Diesel particulate filter § Regeneration

== See also ==
- Ruegen (disambiguation)
