= Jasmund National Park =

Nature reserve on Rügen island, Germany

- Nationalpark Jasmund
- IUCN category II (national park)
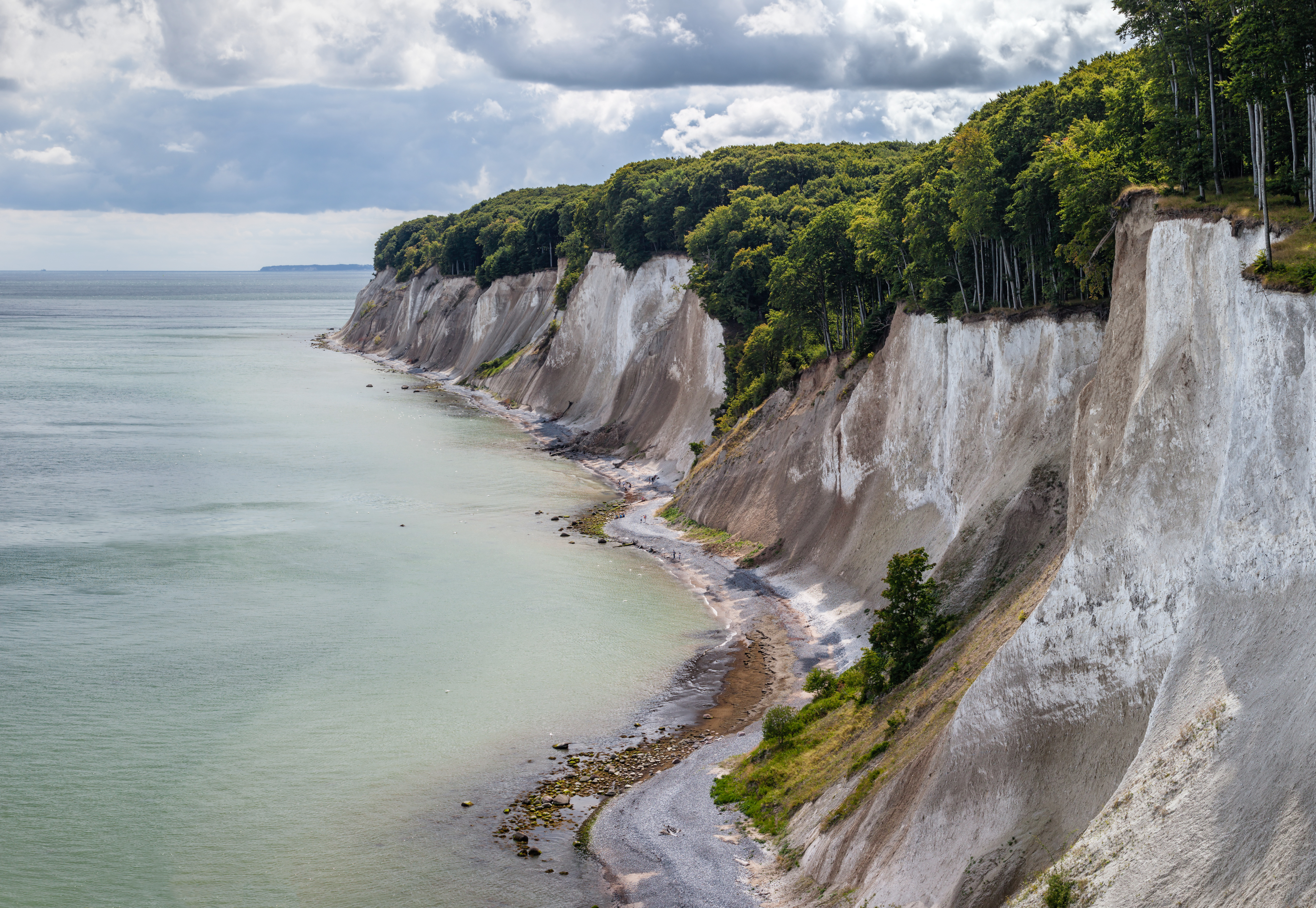
- Cliffs and coastline in the national park
- Interactive map of Jasmund National Park
- Location: Mecklenburg-Vorpommern, Germany
- Nearest city: Sassnitz, Stralsund
- Coordinates: 54°33′N 13°39′E
- Area: 30 km^{2} (12 sq mi)
- Established: 12 September 1990

Jasmund National Park
UNESCO World Heritage Site
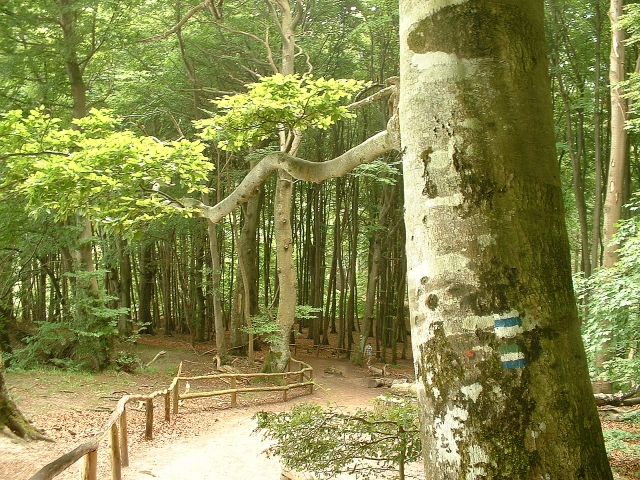
- The beech forest
- Interactive map of Jasmund National Park
- Part of: Ancient and Primeval Beech Forests of the Carpathians and Other Regions of Europe
- Criteria: Natural: ix
- Reference: 1133bis-011
- Inscription: 2011 (35th Session)
- Area: 492.5 ha (1,217 acres)
- Buffer zone: 2,510.5 ha (6,204 acres)

Jasmund National Park (German: Nationalpark Jasmund) is a nature reserve on the Jasmund peninsula, in the northeast of Rügen island in Mecklenburg-Vorpommern, Germany. It is famous for containing the largest Rügen chalk cliffs in Germany, the highest of which is Königsstuhl (German = "king's chair"), rising to 118 m (387 ft) above the Baltic Sea. The highest point in the park as a whole is Piekberg, at 161 m (528 ft) above sea level. The beech forests behind the cliffs are also part of the national park.

Consisting of only 30 km^{2} (12 sq mi), this is the smallest national park in Germany. The park was founded in September 1990 by the last government of East Germany (GDR) prior to the German reunification.

On 25 June 2011 the beech forest in the park was added to the UNESCO World Heritage List as an extension of the Primeval Beech Forests of Europe site because of its undisturbed nature and its testimony to the ecological history of Europe since the last Ice Age.

== Geography ==
Jasmund National Park includes the ridge of the Stubnitz north of the city of Sassnitz. The ridge is covered with primeval beech forest and the cliffs (2200 ha), also a 500-meter spanning water corridor towards the Baltic Sea (603 ha) and 200 ha in the West, with the former Quoltitz chalk quarries, meadows, moors and dry grasslands.

== Chalk cliffs ==
The cliffs of Jasmund National Park belong to the Rügen Chalk unit. The chalk cliffs face constant erosion. With every storm, parts of the cliffs fall, including rocks and fossils of sponges, oysters and sea urchins.

The most majestic part of the cliffs is the Königsstuhl (English: king's chair) which stands at 118 m (387 ft). One of the most scenic and best known of the chalk outcrops, the Wissower Klinken, collapsed into the Baltic Sea on 24 February 2005, in a landslide caused by spring-thaw weather conditions.

== Flora and fauna ==
Because of the special geological characteristics of Jasmund National Park, it is home to many rare plants and animals.

In the woods of the Stubnitz, behind the cliffs, there are numerous water-filled dells and hollows, most of which came into existence as ice-age dead-ice holes. A wide range of plants is found in this area, for example, black alder, European crab apple, wild service tree, yew and orchids (such as Cypripedium calceolus).

A variety of birds lives in the park, including white-tailed eagles, common kingfishers, house martins and peregrine falcons.

== Management ==
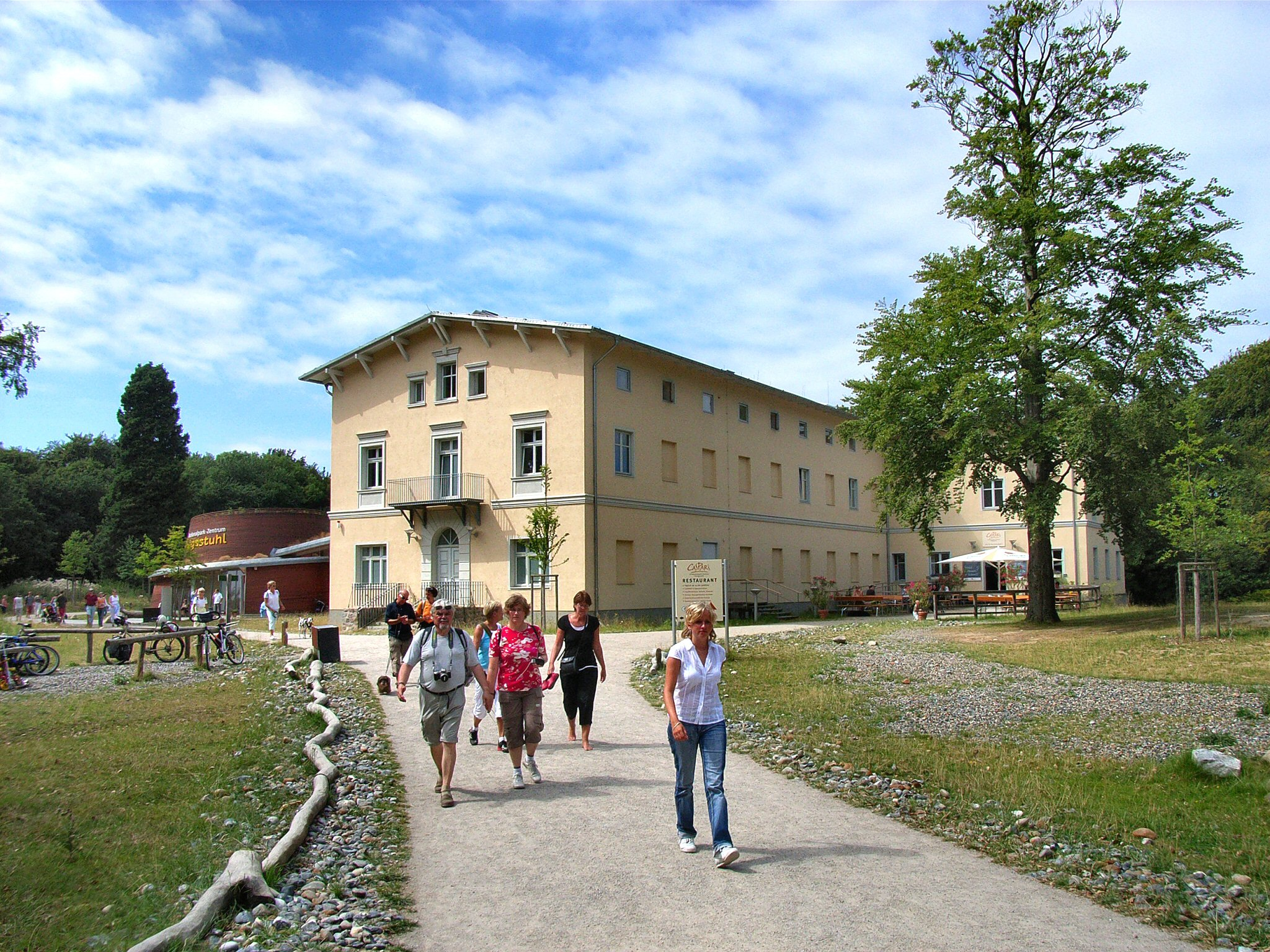
Königsstuhl National Park Centre

Since its creation in 1934, Jasmund National Park has attracted hundreds of thousands of visitors annually. One of the main tasks of the National Park Authority is to ensure that the diverse habitats of the park remain largely undisturbed, whilst still allowing visitors an insight into the nature of the region. In March 2004, the visitor centre, the Königsstuhl National Park Centre, was opened.

== Gallery ==
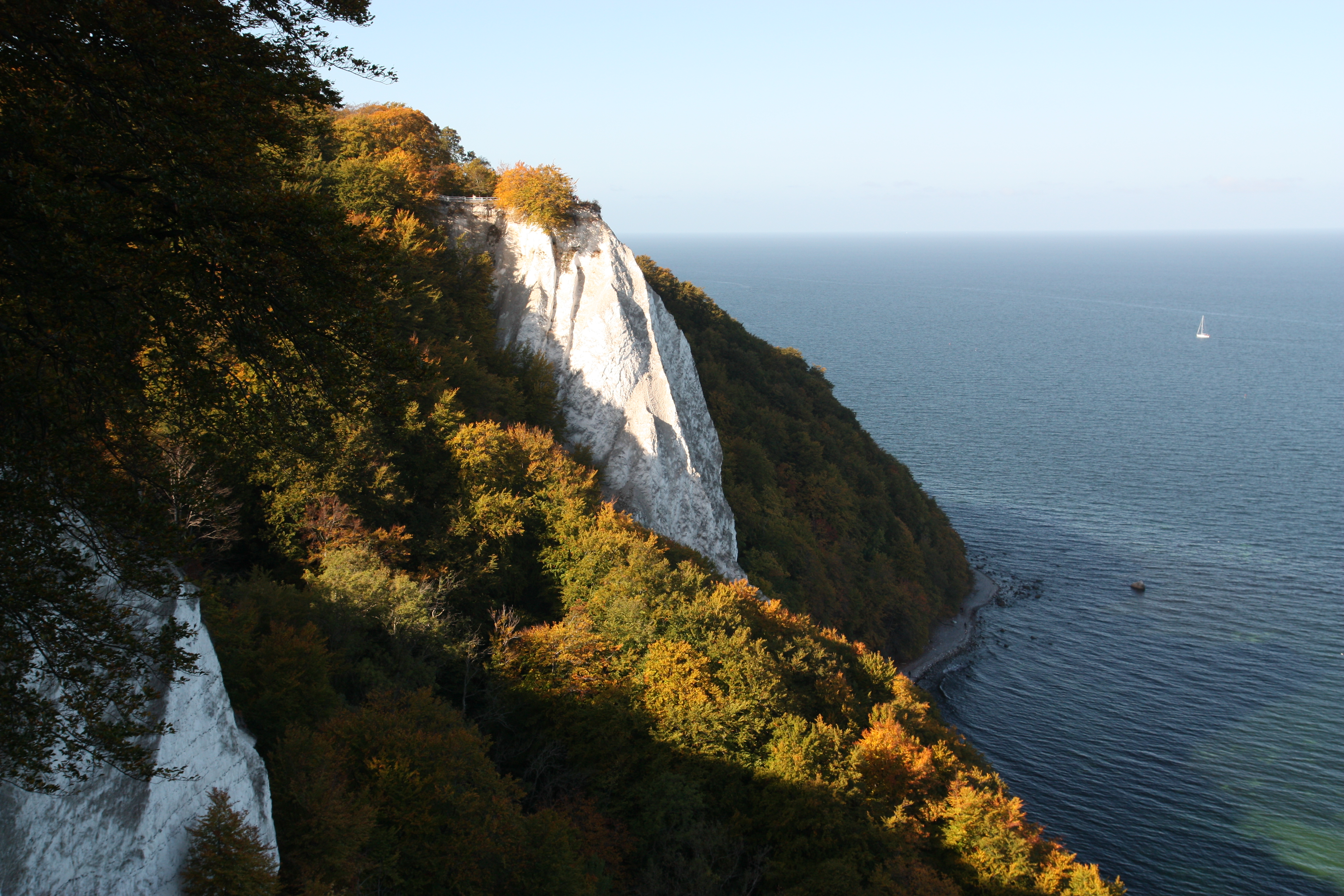
The Königsstuhl (King's Chair)

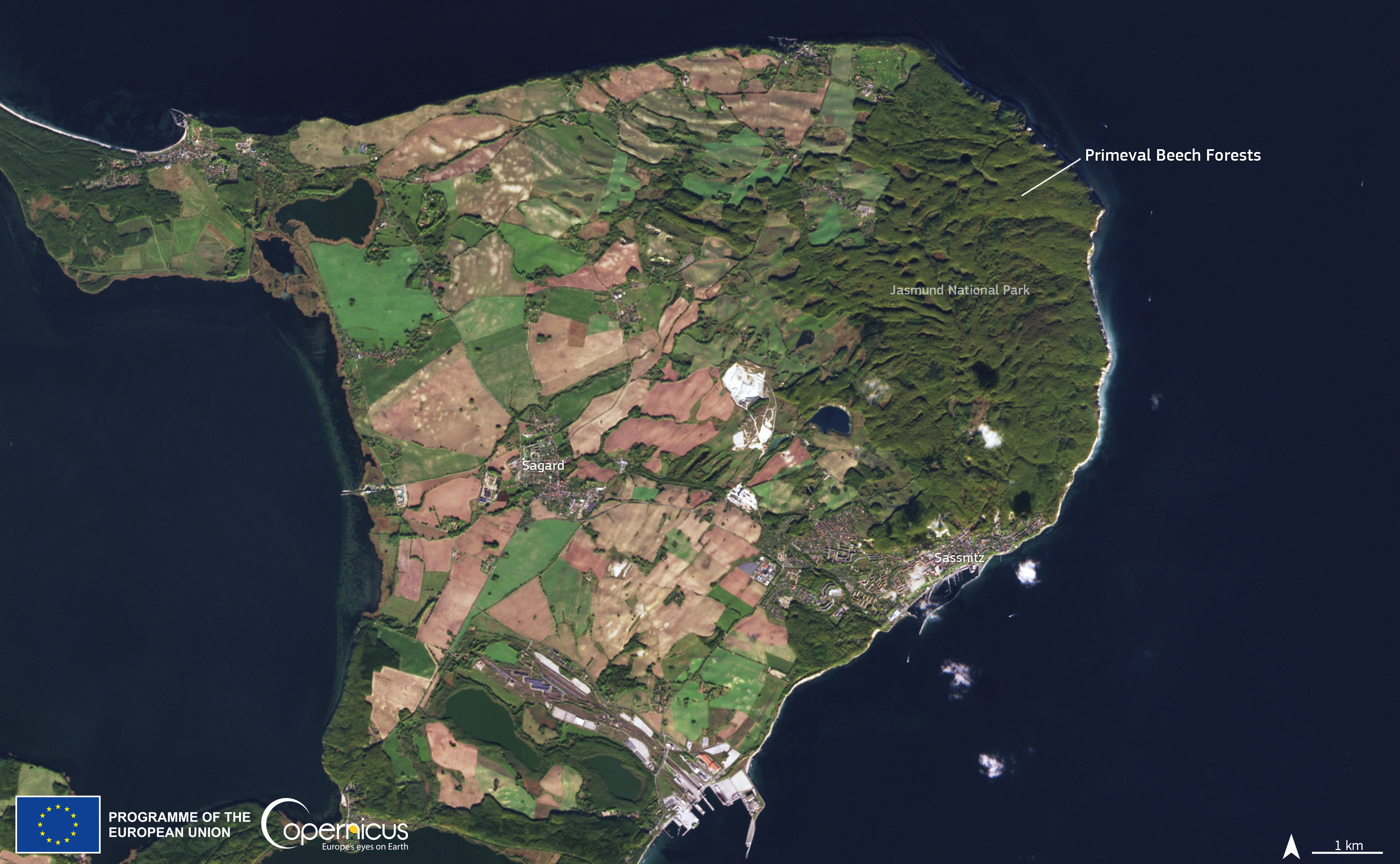
A Sentinel-2 satellite image of the park

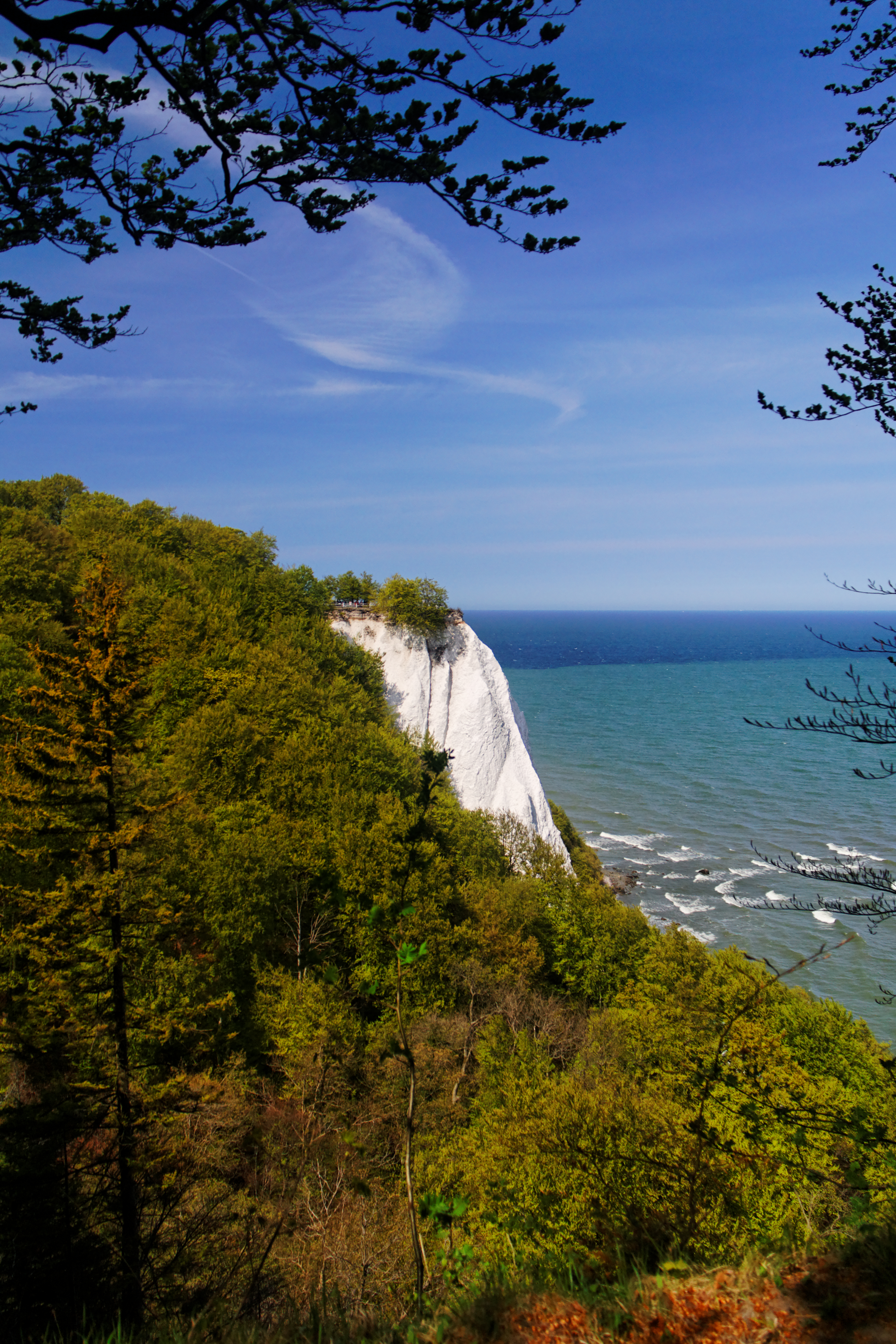
View of Königsstuhl from the south

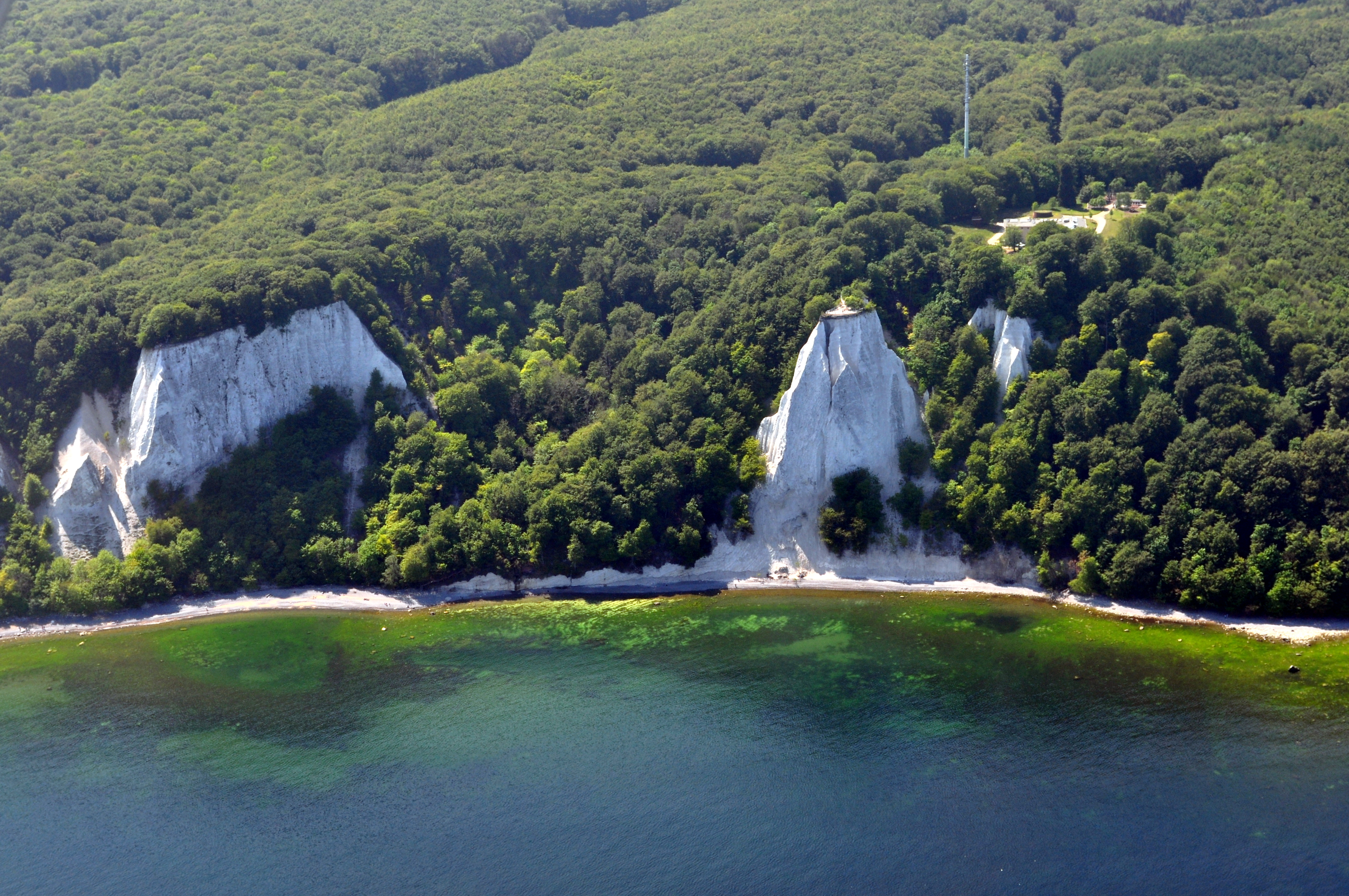
Victoria-Sicht (Victoria's View) and Königsstuhl from above

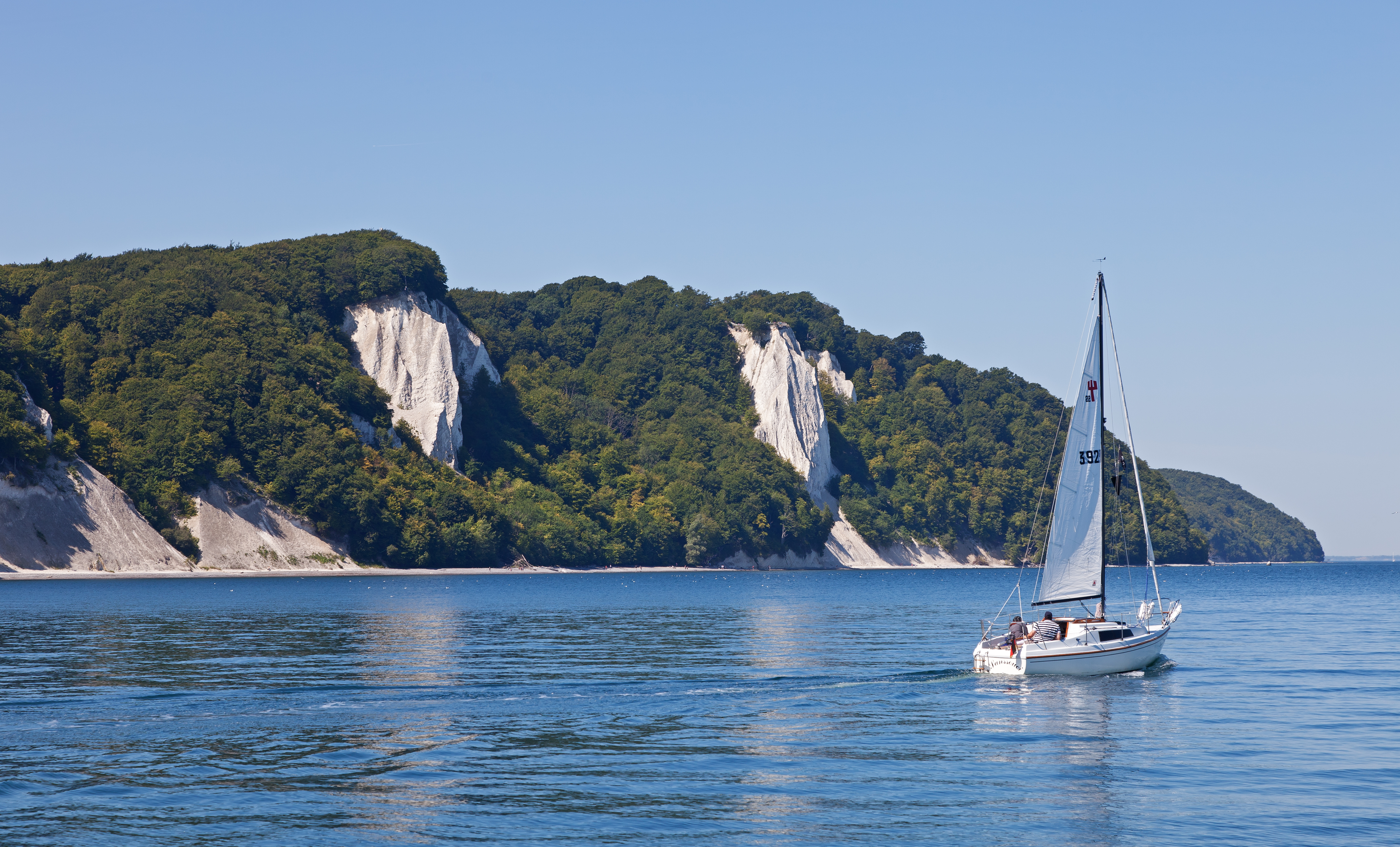
Victoria-Sicht and Königsstuhl from the Baltic Sea

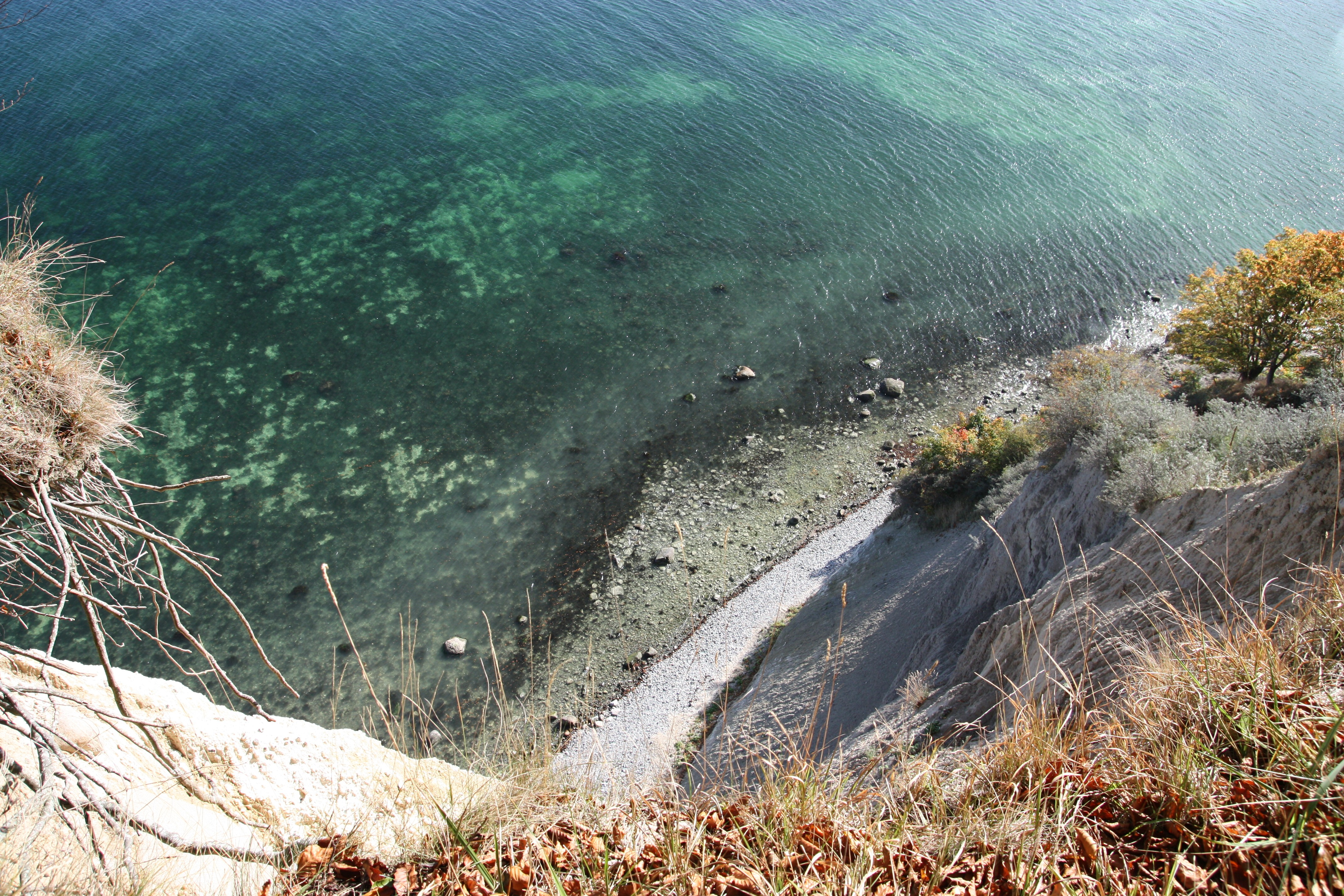
View down the white cliffs

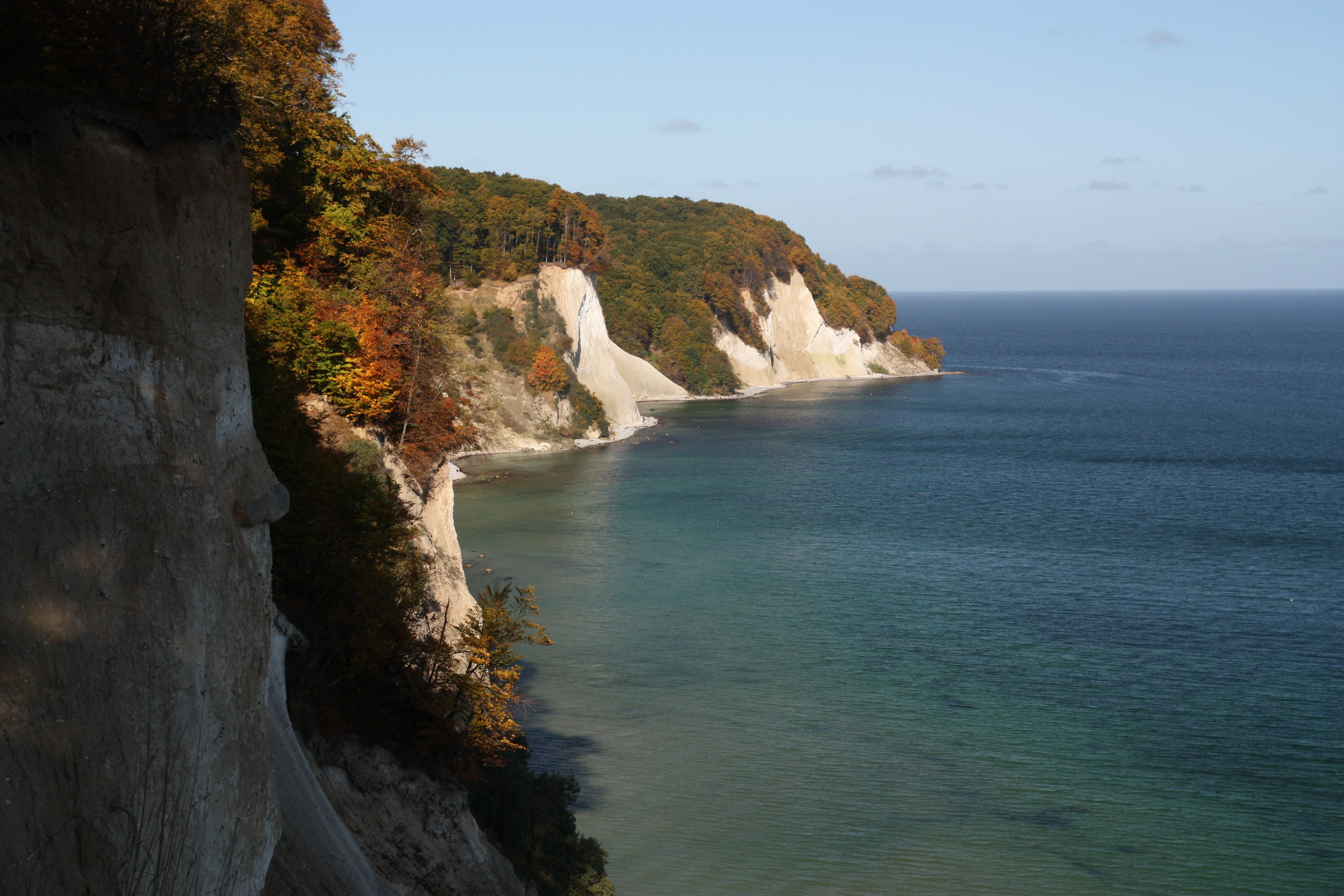
The chalk cliffs

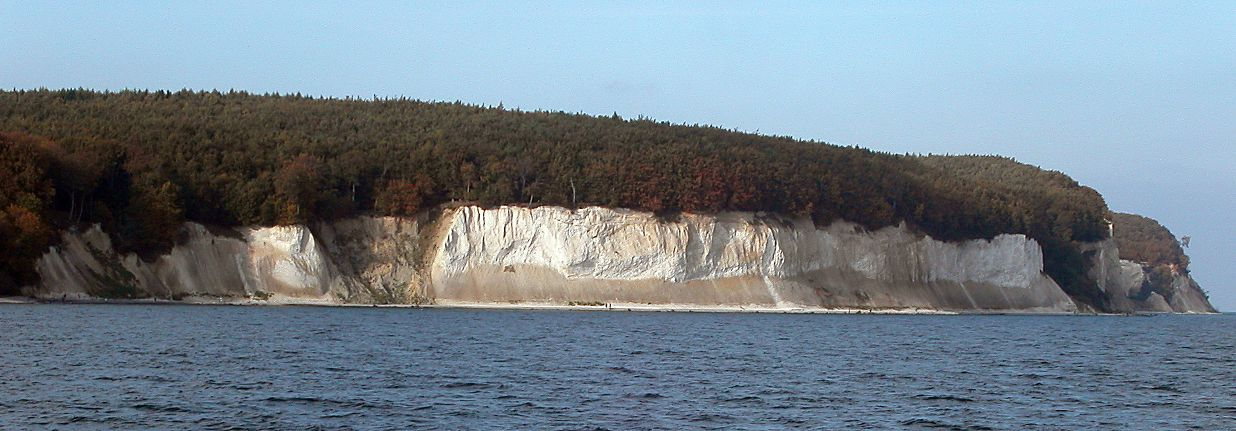
Stubbenkammer

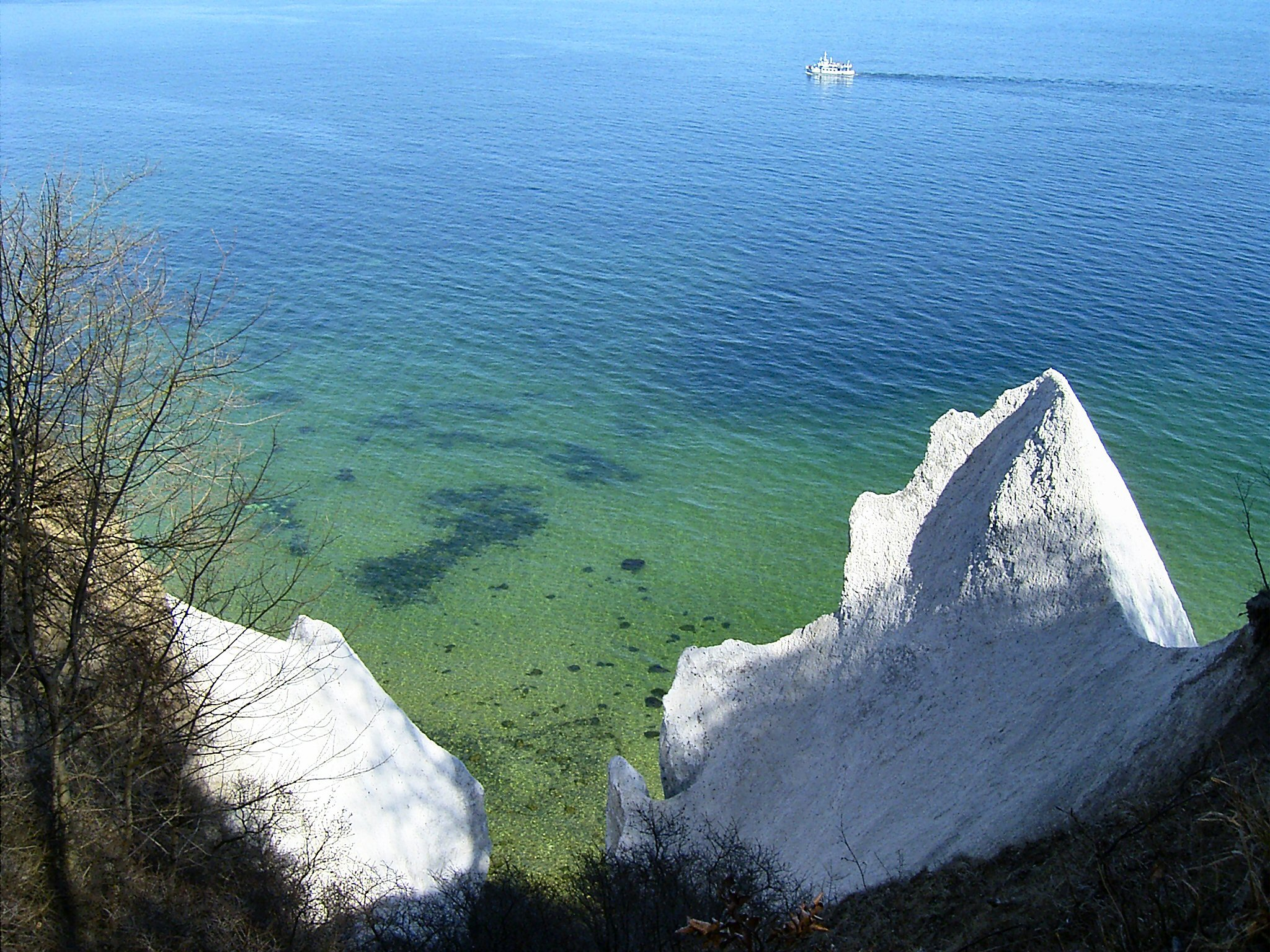
Wissower Klinken
(April 2004)

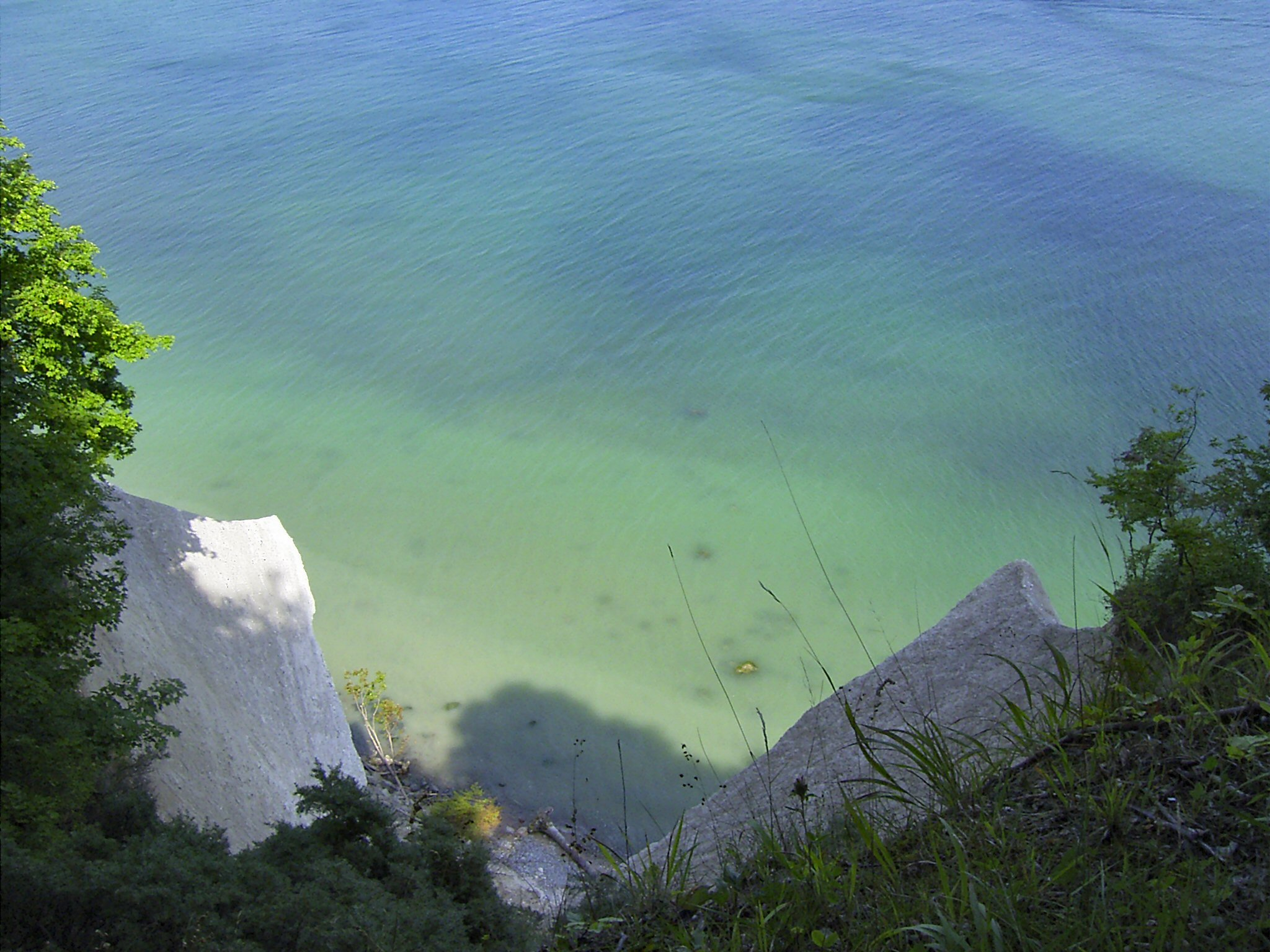
Wissower Klinken
(August 2005)

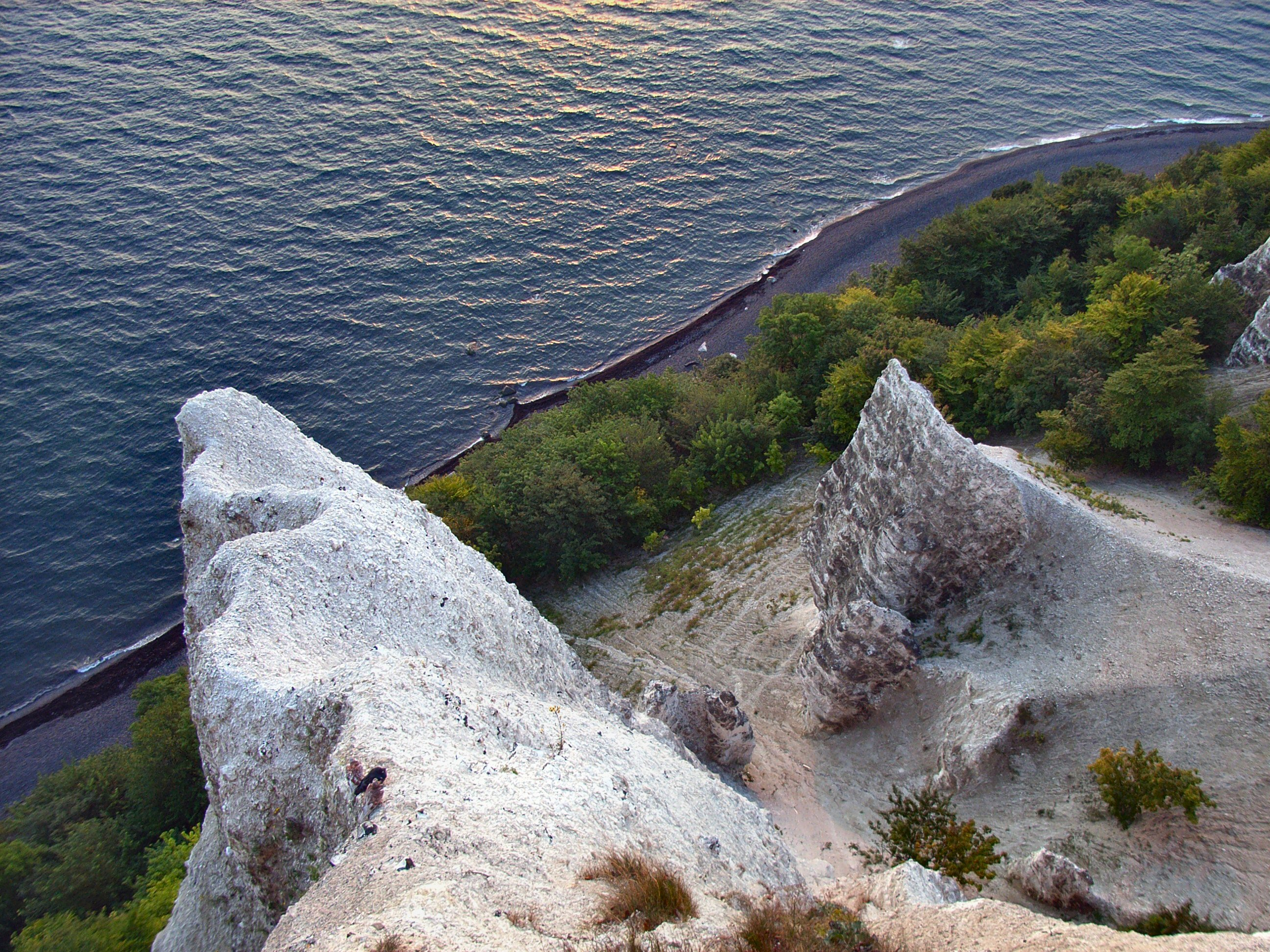
Victoria-Sicht (Victoria's View)

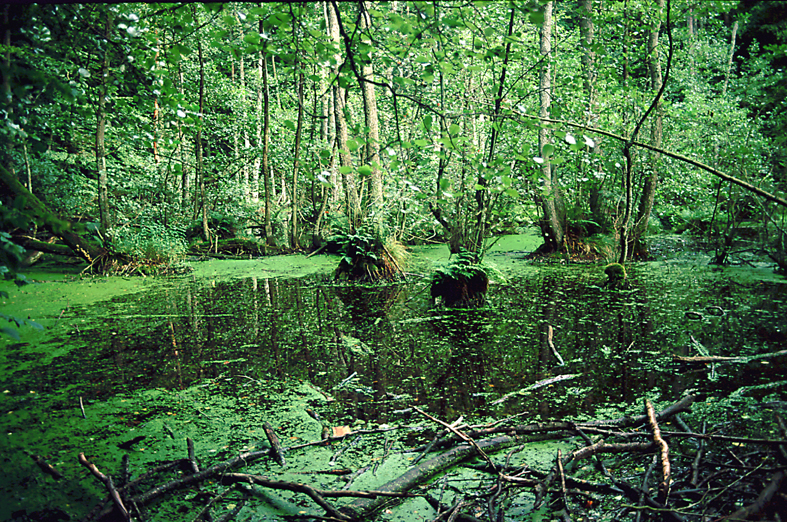
Black alder swamp

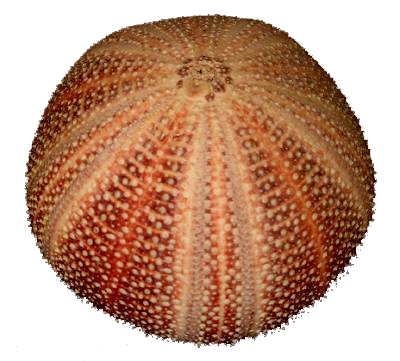
Unfossilised sea urchin

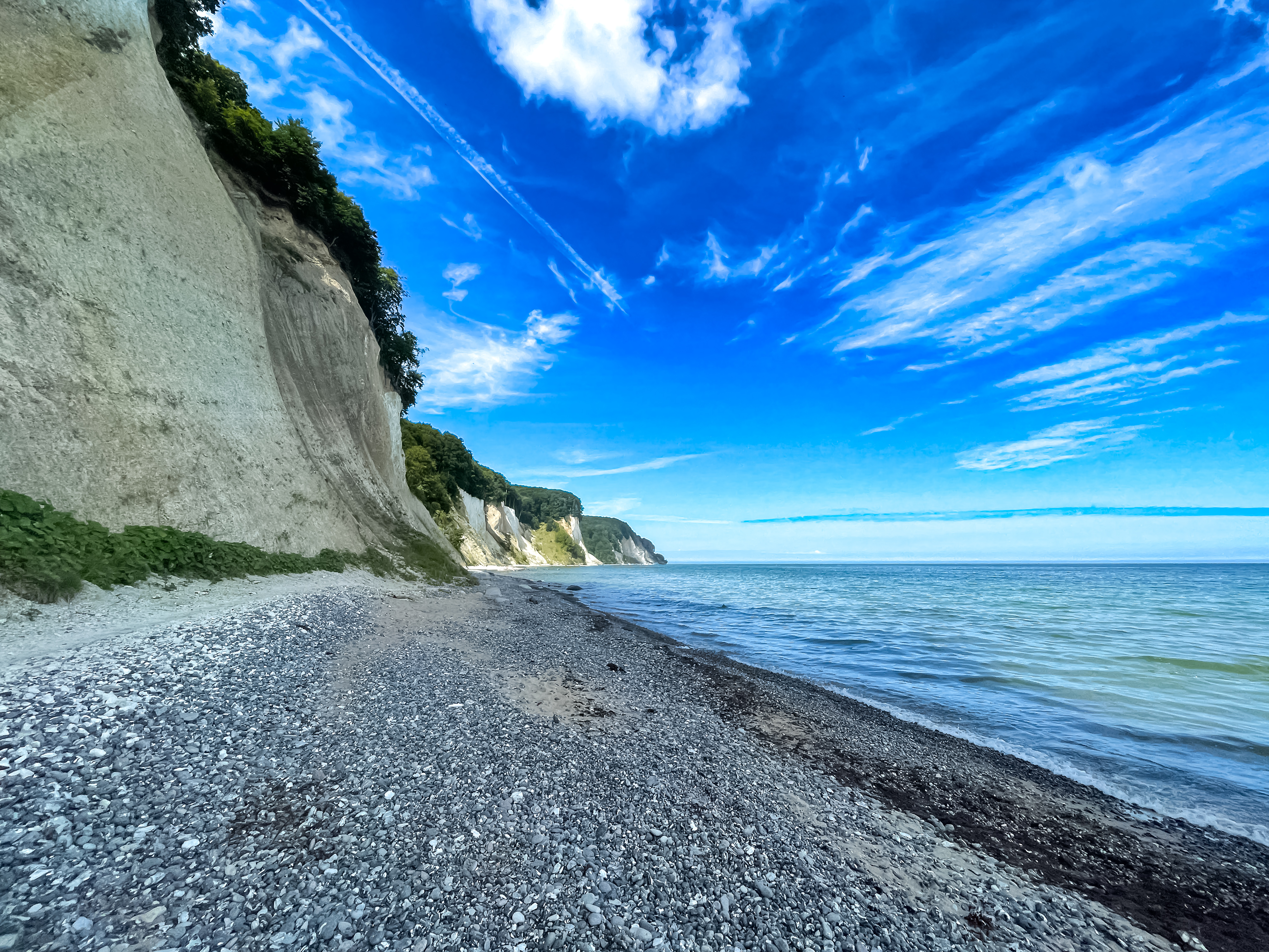
View from cliff's beach
