= Battle of Rügen =

Battle of Rügen may refer to:

- Battle of Rügen (1565)
- Battle of Rügen (1715)
- Battle of Rügen (1864)

== See also ==
- Operation Rügen, code name for the 1937 bombing of Guernica during the Spanish Civil War
- Wars of the Rügen Succession (14th century)
- Ruegen (disambiguation)
