= Königsstuhl (Rügen) =

Chalk cliff on Rügen Island, Germany

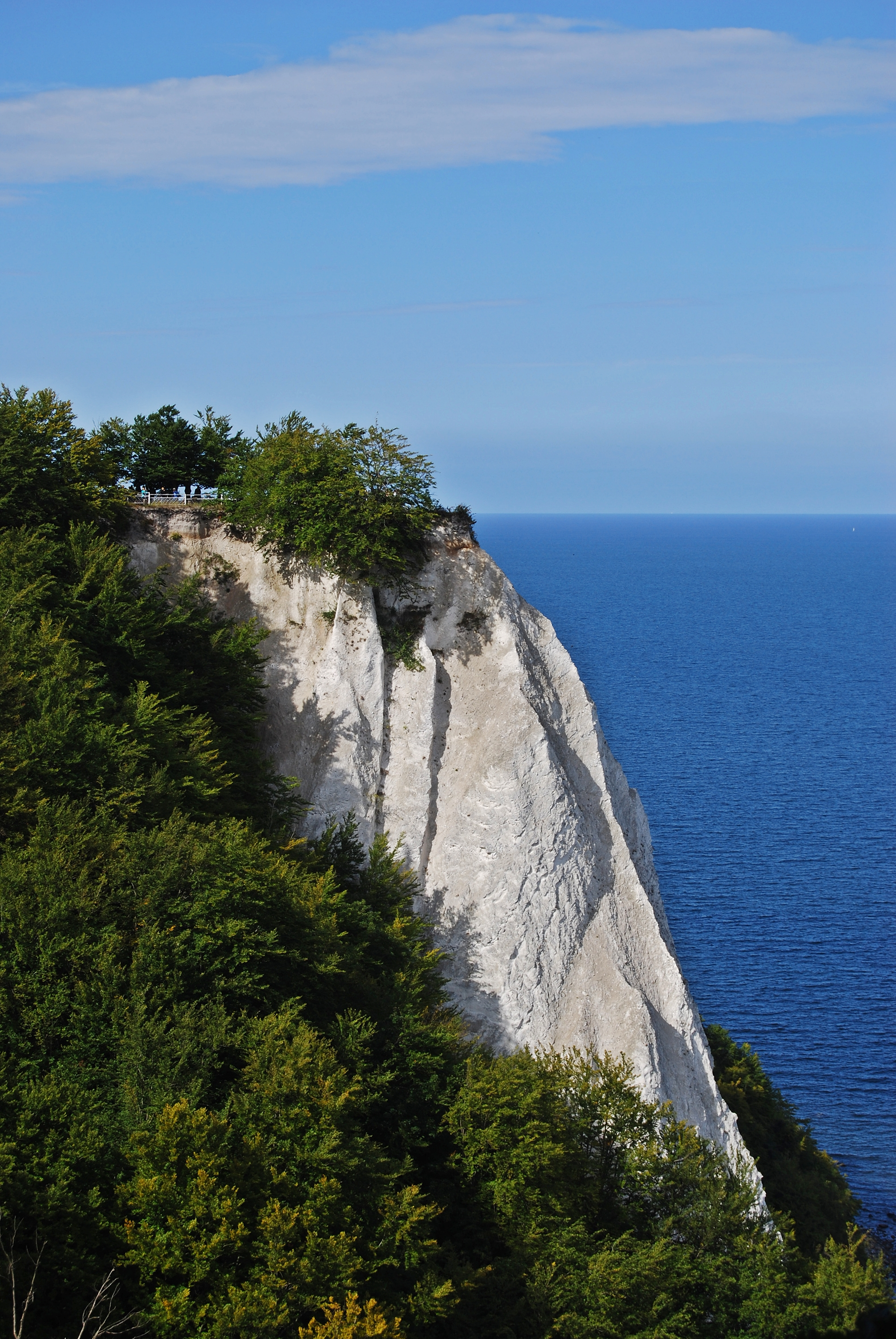
- Königsstuhl – seen from Victoria's View (2012)

Highest point
- Elevation: 118 m above sea level (NN) (387 ft)
- Coordinates: 54°34′23″N 13°39′45″E

Geography
- Location within Mecklenburg-Vorpommern
- Location: Rügen, Mecklenburg-Vorpommern, Germany

Geology
- Mountain type: Chalk

Königsstuhl (King's Chair) is the best-known chalk cliff on the Stubbenkammer in Jasmund National Park on the Baltic Sea island of Rügen. It lies at 118 m above sea level (NN).

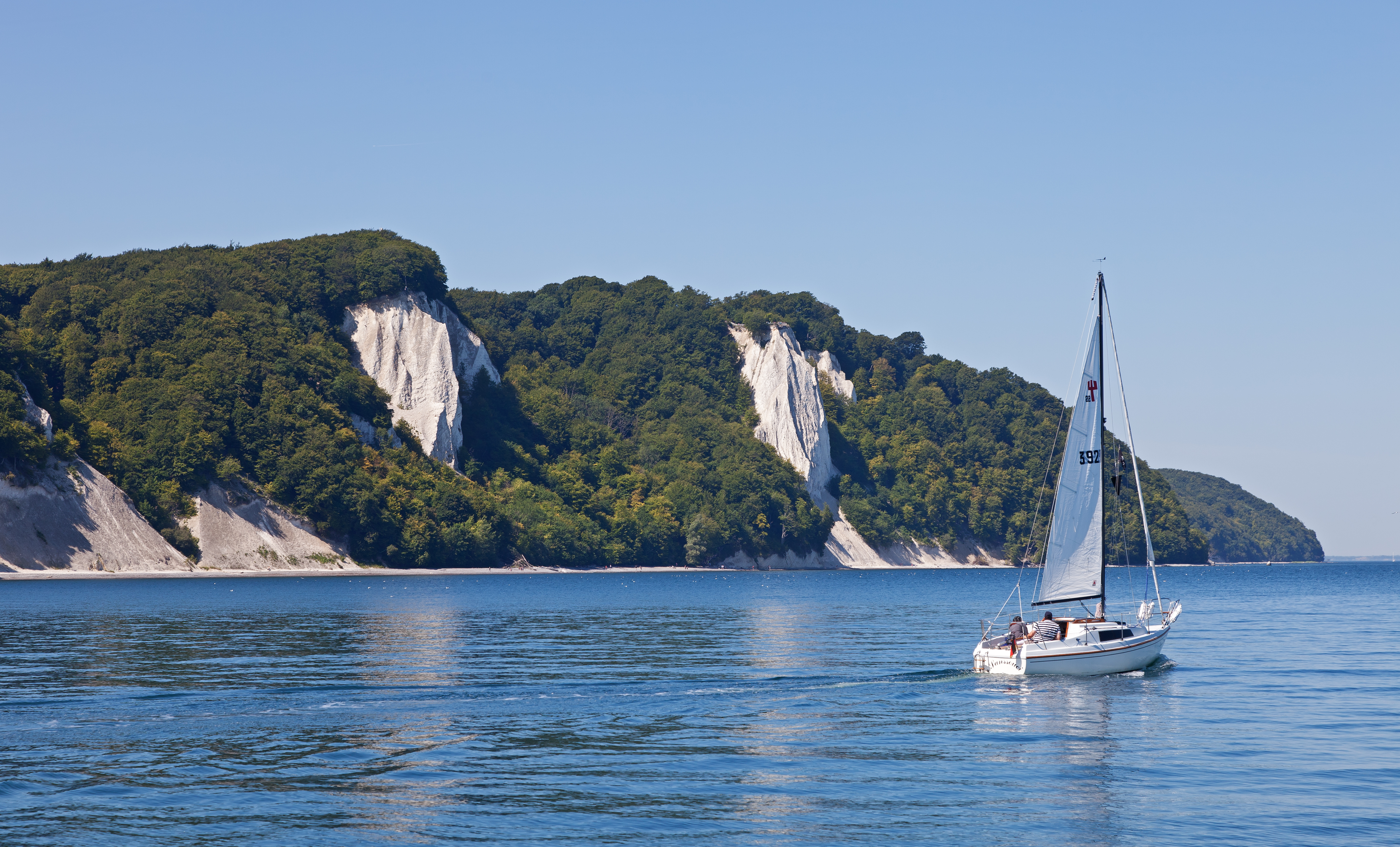
Victoria-Sicht (Victoria's View) and Königsstuhl (King's Chair) from the Baltic Sea

In 2004, Königsstuhl was incorporated into the terrain of Königsstuhl National Park Centre. It can be reached along a cliff top path, 11 kilometres (6.8 mi) long in total, that runs from Sassnitz to Lohme, or from the large car park in Hagen (in the municipality of Lohme) 3 km (1.9 mi) away. Since 2004, entry to the National Park Centre, and hence access to Königsstuhl, has been subject to a charge.

The narrow yet massive granite steps that lead to the plateau on Königsstuhl, 200 m^{2} (2,200 sq ft) in area, lie over the site of what is suspected to be a Bronze Age barrow. From the plateau there is a sweeping view of the Baltic Sea. Königsstuhl itself is best seen from the viewing point of Victoria View (Victoria-Sicht) to the south.

There is a legend that the name Königsstuhl ("King's Chair") goes back to an event in 1715 when the Swedish king Charles XII is supposed to have commanded a sea battle against the Danes from this spot. The battle tired the ruler so much that he needed to take a chair.

However, the name Königsstuhl was used in a travel report by the vicar, Rhenan, in 1586, who had been tasked by the Pomeranian duke to find mineral springs; thus it is clear that it had been named much earlier.

According to a legend, the name is actually derived from a custom whereby in ancient times the person elected king was the first to climb the cliffs from the sea and sit in the chair on the top.

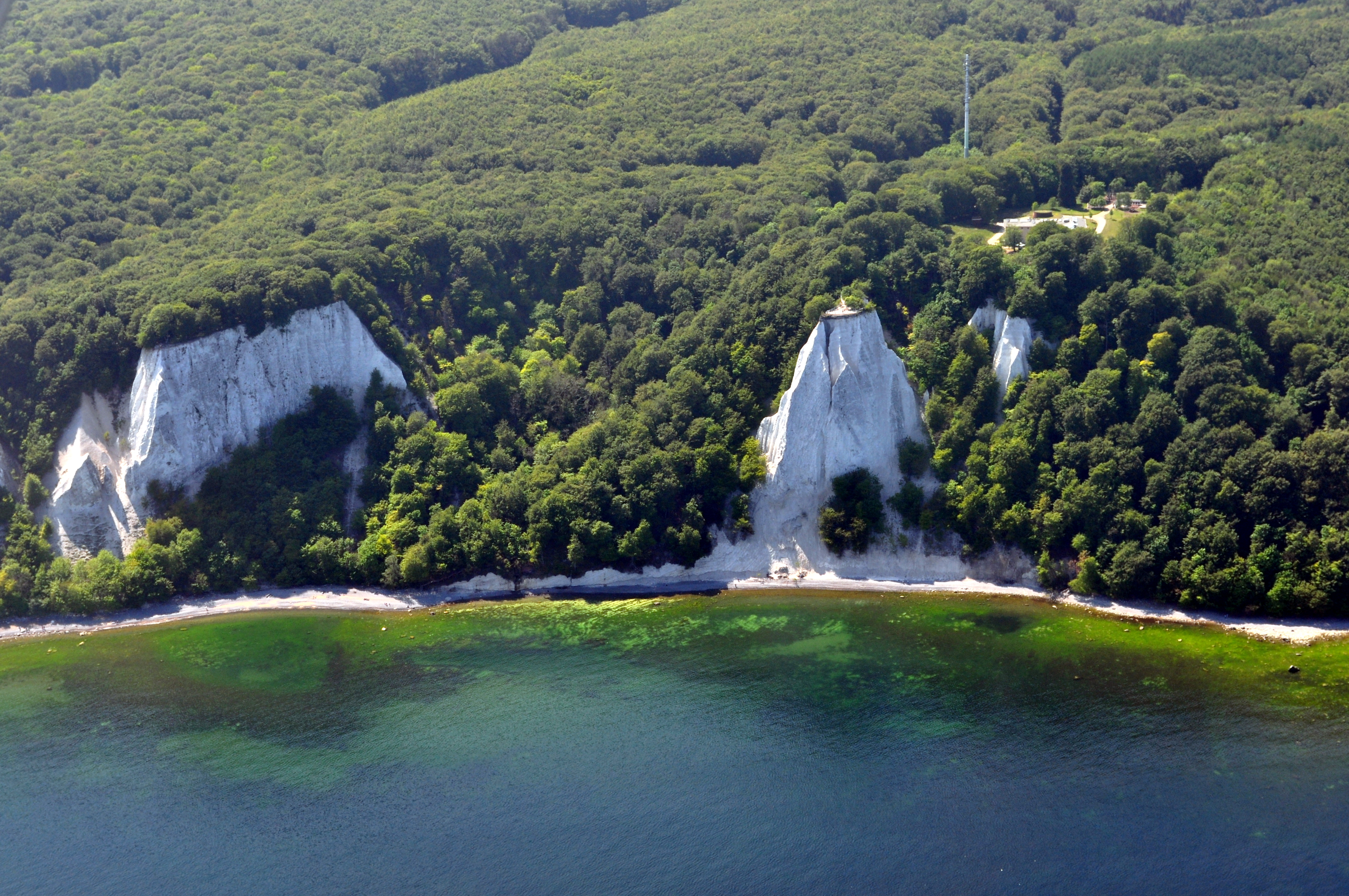
Victoria-Sicht (Victoria's View) and Königsstuhl (King's Chair) from above

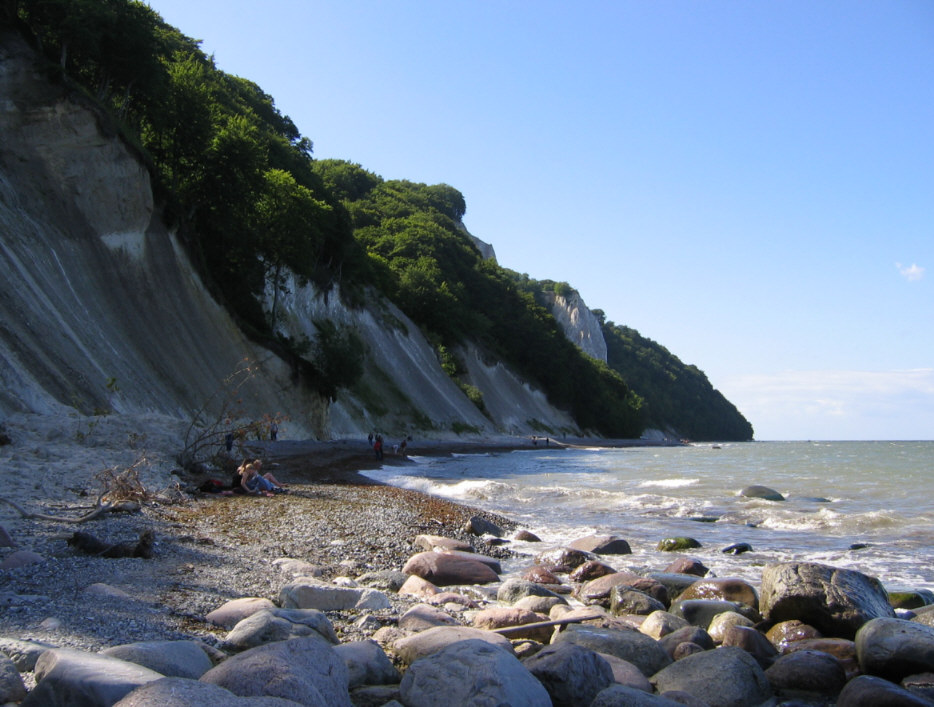
View towards Stubbenkammer, the area around Königsstuhl

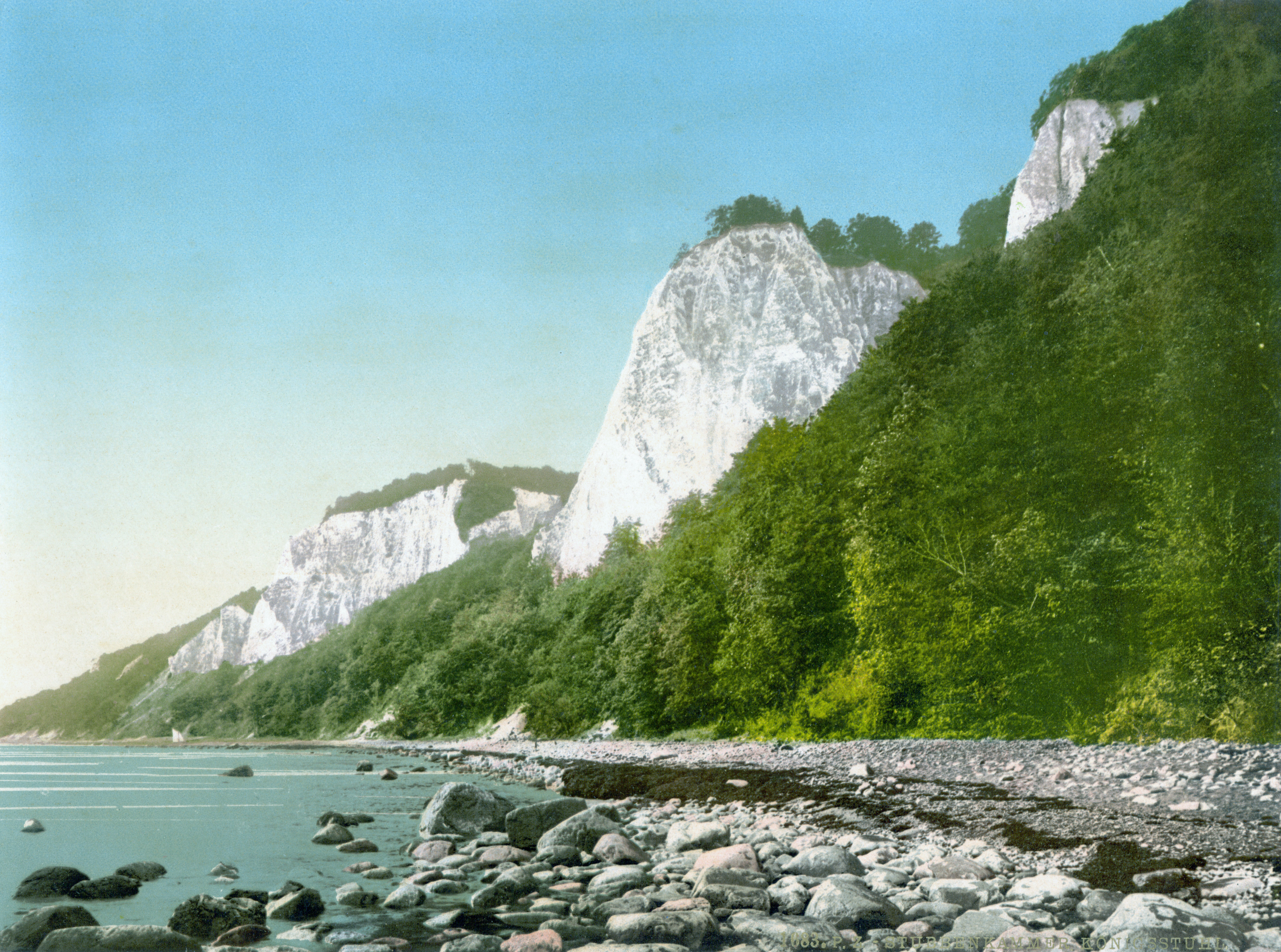
View from the beach
(around 1900)

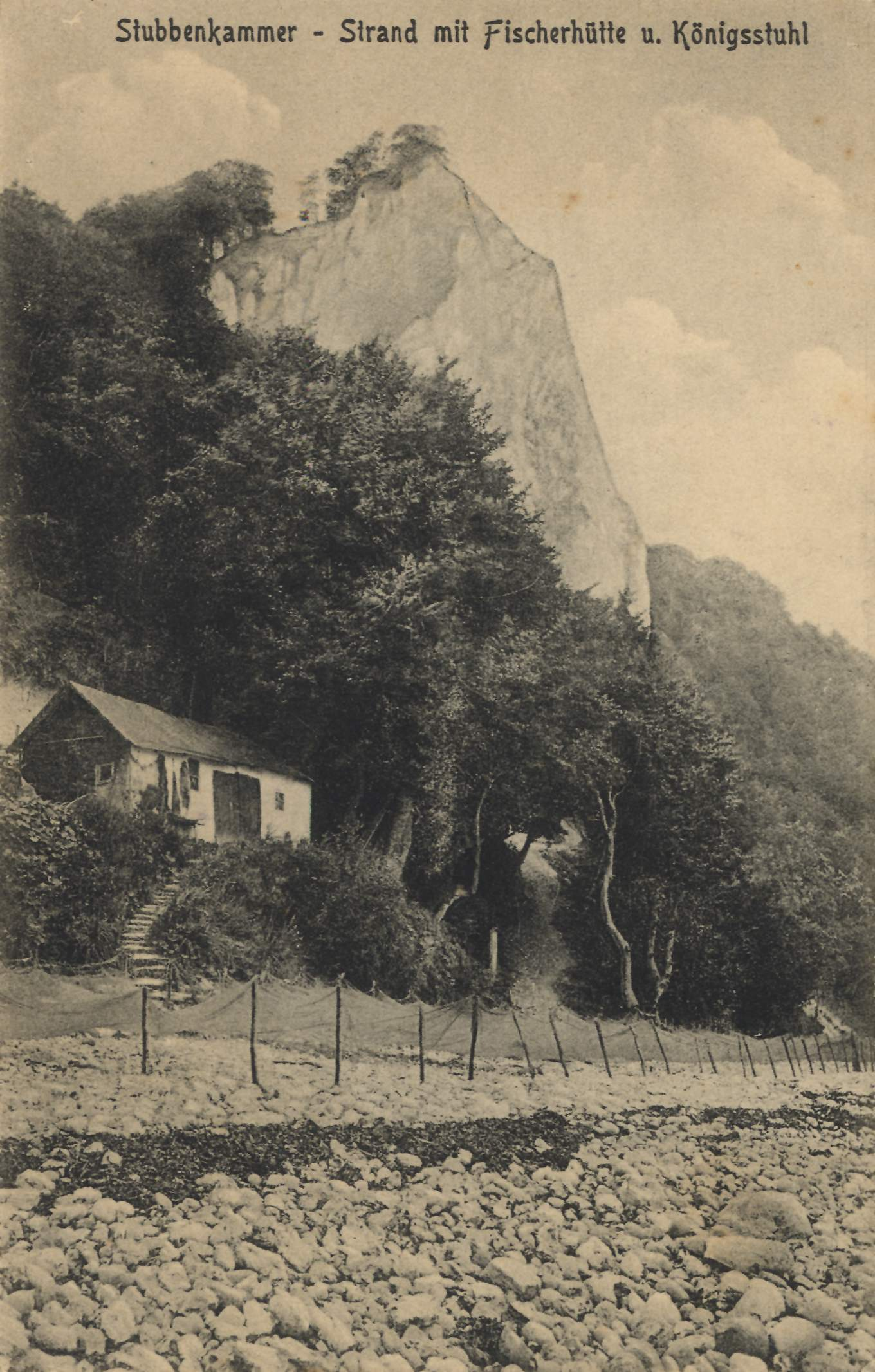
Postcard of Königsstuhl, 1927

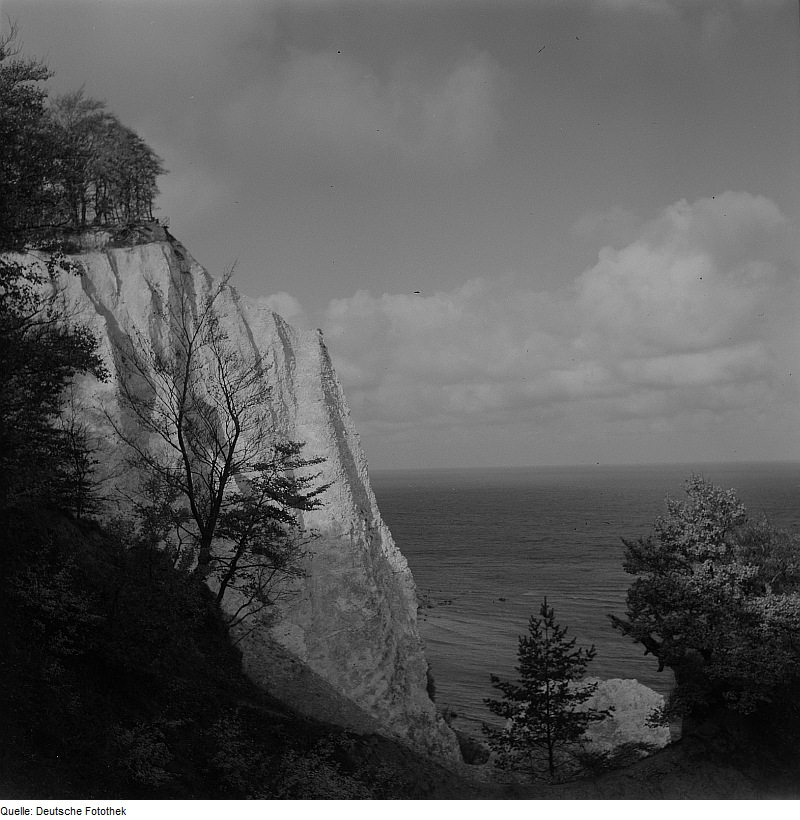
Before 1970

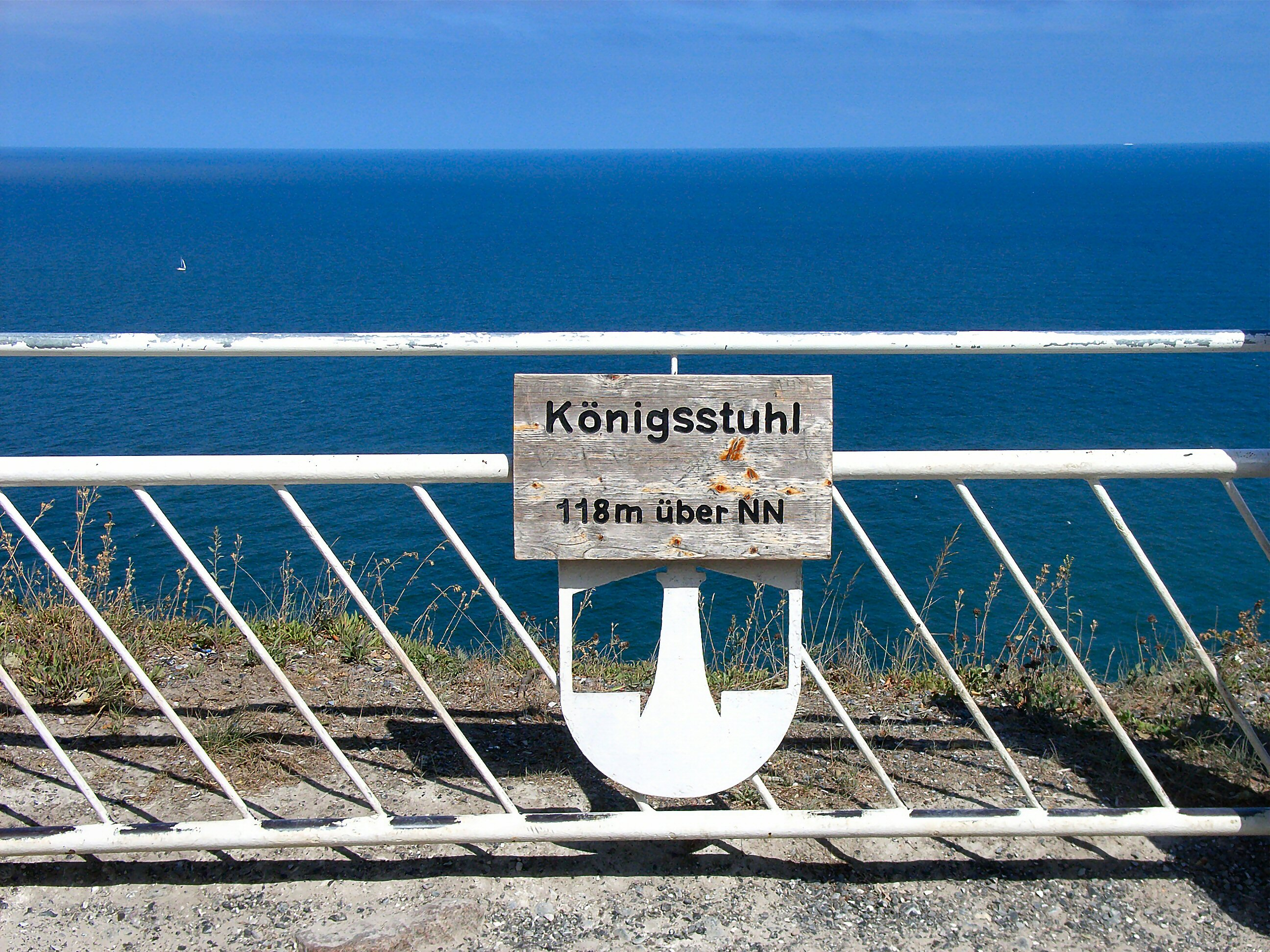
On top of Königsstuhl, at 118 m (387 ft) above sea level

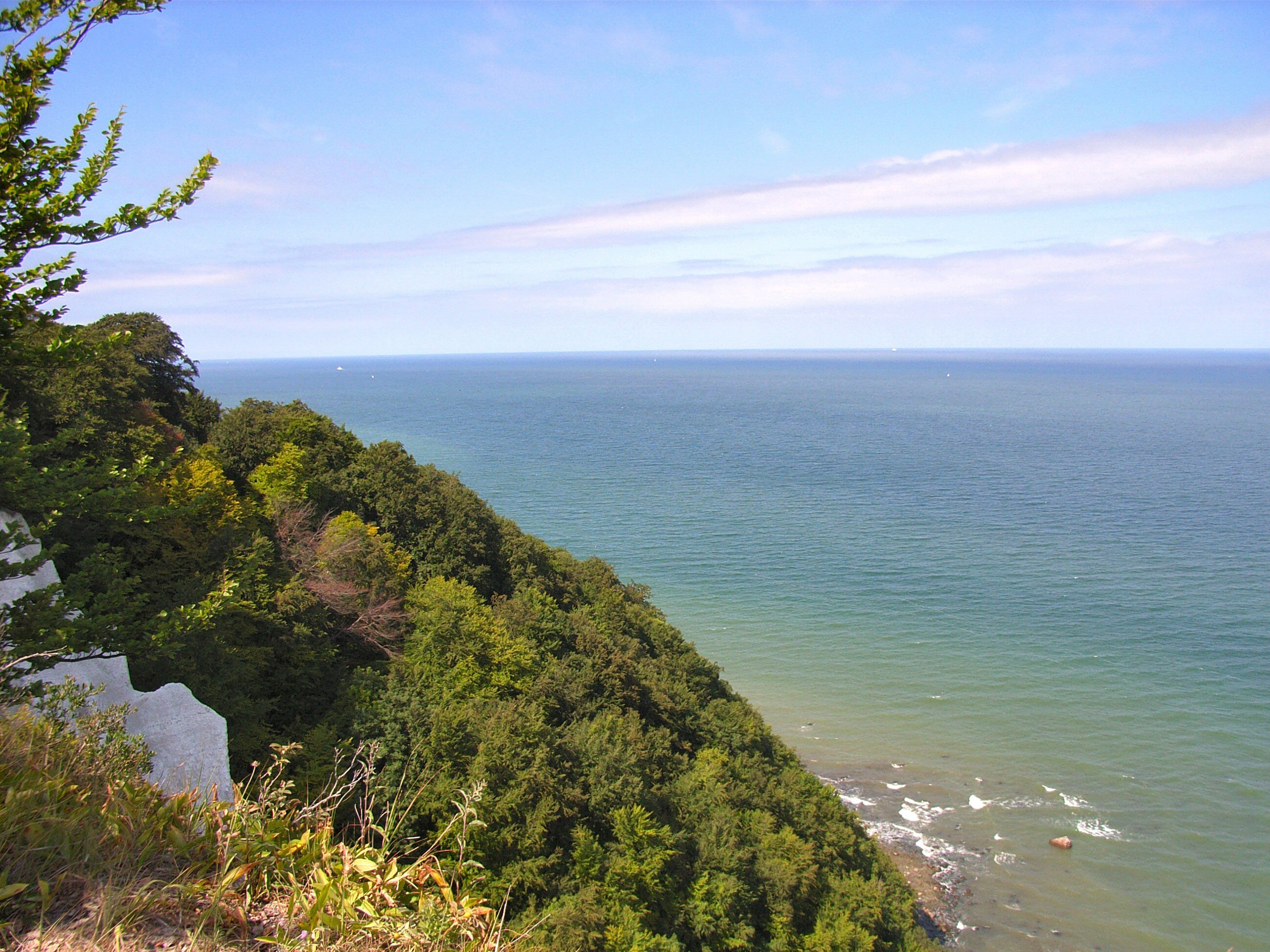
View from Königsstuhl, northwards
