= Stubnitz =

Coordinates: 54°33′N 13°38′E

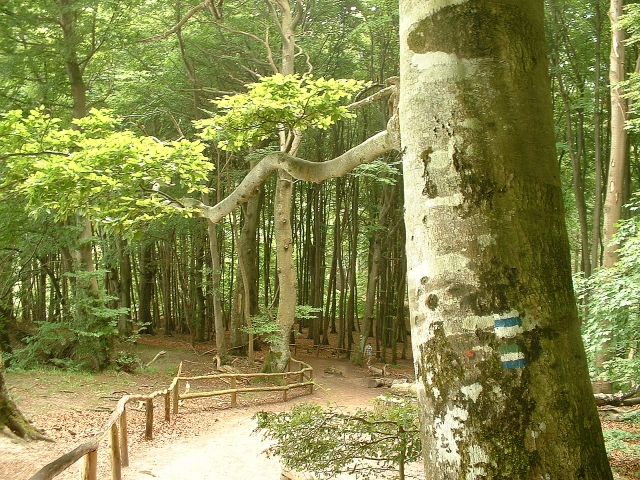
Beeches in the Stubnitz

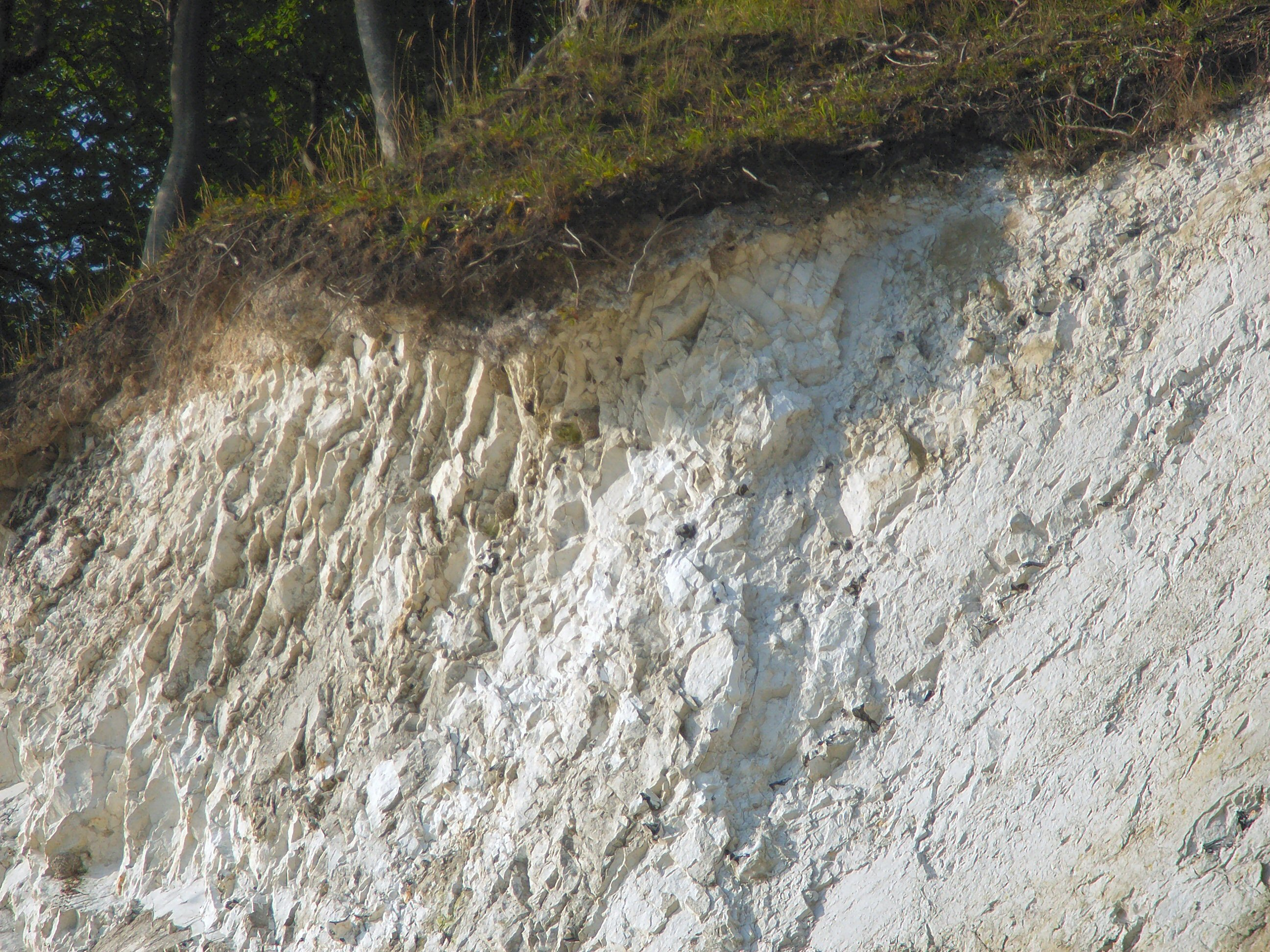
The extremely thin layer of surface vegetation is especially visible on the edge of the cliff top

The Stubnitz is a hilly, forested landscape region on the east coast of the Jasmund peninsula on the German Baltic Sea island of Rügen – Germany's largest island. It covers an area of about 2,400 ha and runs from the town of Sassnitz to the municipality of Lohme, Today, it is almost entirely part of the 3,000 ha Jasmund National Park. The name Stubnitz is probably of Slavic origin; but the literature gives a wide variety of meanings – from Stufenland ("stepped landscape") to Waldung mit Bienenkellern ("woods with beehives").

== Literature ==
- Johann Jacob Grümbke: Streifzüge durch das Rügenland. (1805), Neuauflage durch F. A. Brockhaus Verlag Leipzig (Hrsg.: Albert Burkhardt), Leipzig, 1988, ISBN 3-325-00168-8.
- Nationalparkamt Rügen (ed.): Die Stubnitz: Der Buchenwald an der Kreideküste, Lancken-Granitz, 2001
- Verein der Freunde und Förderer des Nationalparks Jasmund e. V. (Hrsg.): Die Insel Rügen – Nationalpark Jasmund. 2nd edition, Sassnitz, 2002.
- Biederstaedt, Frank: „... und wenn er vernichtet ist, so ist das Land verdorben.“ Die wechselvolle Geschichte der Stubnitz auf Rügen. Elmenhorst 2011. ISBN 978-3-939680-10-9
