= Rugi =

Rugi may refer to:

- Rugii, an ancient Germanic tribe
- Rugi (sword), a traditional sword from Indonesia.
- Rugi, Caraş-Severin, a village in Păltiniș Commune, Caraş-Severin County
- Rugi, Gorj, a village in Turcinești Commune, Gorj County
- Rugi, Bagalkot, a village in Karnataka, India
