= Ruga =

Ruga may refer to:

- Ruga (anatomy), an anatomical fold
- Ruga, Nepal
- Ruga language, an extinct Sino-Tibetan language that was spoken in Meghalaya, India
- Ruga-Ruga, irregular troops in Eastern Africa, often deployed by western colonial forces
- Rugila, 5th-century Hunnic ruler
- Spurius Carvilius Ruga, 3rd-century Roman grammarian who invented the letter g
