= Rügischer Bodden =

Bay in Germany

Coordinates: 54°16′N 13°32′E

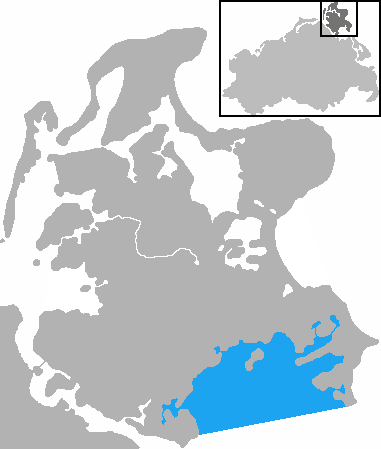
The Rügische Bodden

The Rügische Bodden is a bay which is part of a larger stretch of water, the Greifswalder Bodden, bounded on two sides by the German mainland and on a third by the Baltic Sea island of Rügen. It is located southeast of Rügen island between Mönchgut and the Zudar peninsula. At Mönchgut, several headlands project into the bodden: the Reddevitz Höft, the Klein Zicker and the Großer Zicker. The inlet between Rügen and the Reddevitzer Höft is known as Having; between the Reddevitzer Höft and the Großer Zicker lies the inlet of Hagensche Wiek. Other bays are the Schoritzer Wiek, the Selliner See and the Neuensiener See. Its southern boundary would be the line between the headlands of the Zudar and Mönchgut peninsulas. There are harbours in Lauterbach, Baabe and Seedorf.

The bodden is part of the Southeast Rügen Biosphere Reserve.

In the northern part of the lagoon, off the village of Lauterbach, lies the island Vilm.
