= Nordperd =

Coordinates: 54°20′27″N 13°45′54″E

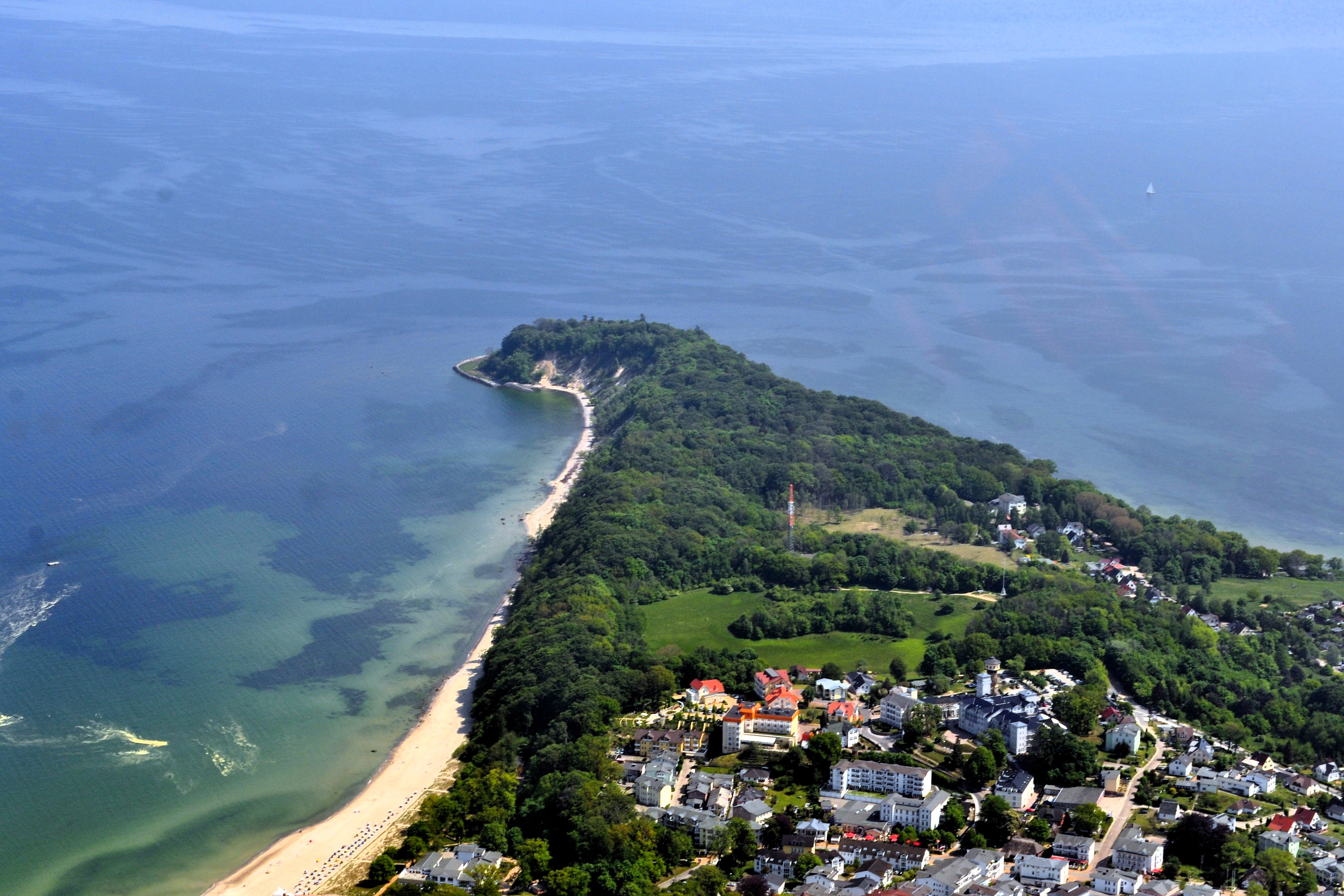
Aerial photograph of Nordperd

The Nordperd (Perd = Slavic for protrusion or prominence) is a cape on the German Baltic Sea island of Rügen. It is part of the Southeast Rügen Biosphere Reserve and the Mönchgut Nature Reserve.

The cape forms the eastern point of the island of Rügen and the district of Vorpommern-Rügen. The roughly 1,500-metre (0.93 mi) long headland has the shape of an isosceles triangle, which ends in a roughly 20-metre (66 ft) high wooded cliff at its tip. The Nordperd has been protected by coastal defence measures and is thus relatively unaffected by the normal active processes of a graded shoreline.

The Nordperd section of the Mönchgut Nature Reserve has an area of 69 hectares (170 acres). Its terrain typically consists of dry grasslands, sycamore-ash woods on the cliff slopes and beaches and shallow waterbodies.

The northern section of beach is separated by Cape Nordperd from the beach at Göhren running southwards. Also, the northern section of the beach has a spa promenade at the Baltic Sea coastal resort Göhren,

Between Göhren Pier and the Nordperd lies the Buskam, the largest glacial erratic in North Germany, which projects about one metre (3.3 ft) above the sea.

The counterpart to the Nordperd is the Südperd, the southeast tip of Rügen in the municipality of Thiessow. Between the Nordperd and the Südperd, 11 kilometres (6.8 mi) away, are the flat sandy beaches of the Mönchgut peninsula, interrupted by the 15-metre (49 ft)-high cliff at Lobber Ort.

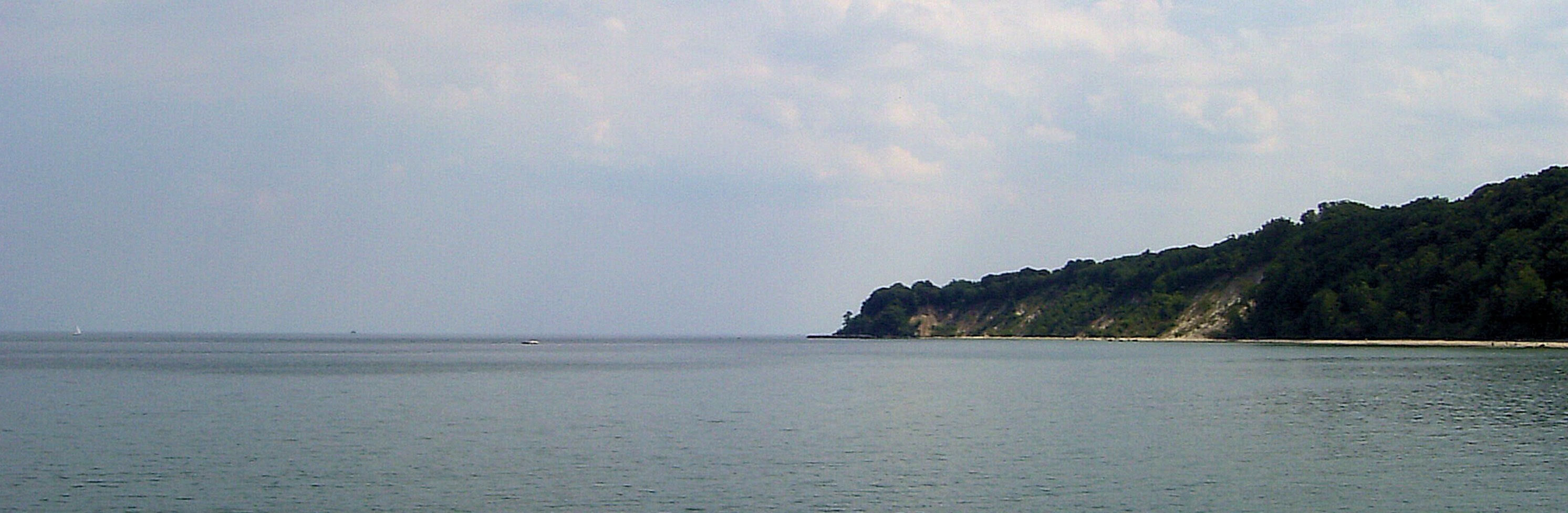
Cape Nordperd seen from Göhren Pier. Left of the cape is the Buskam

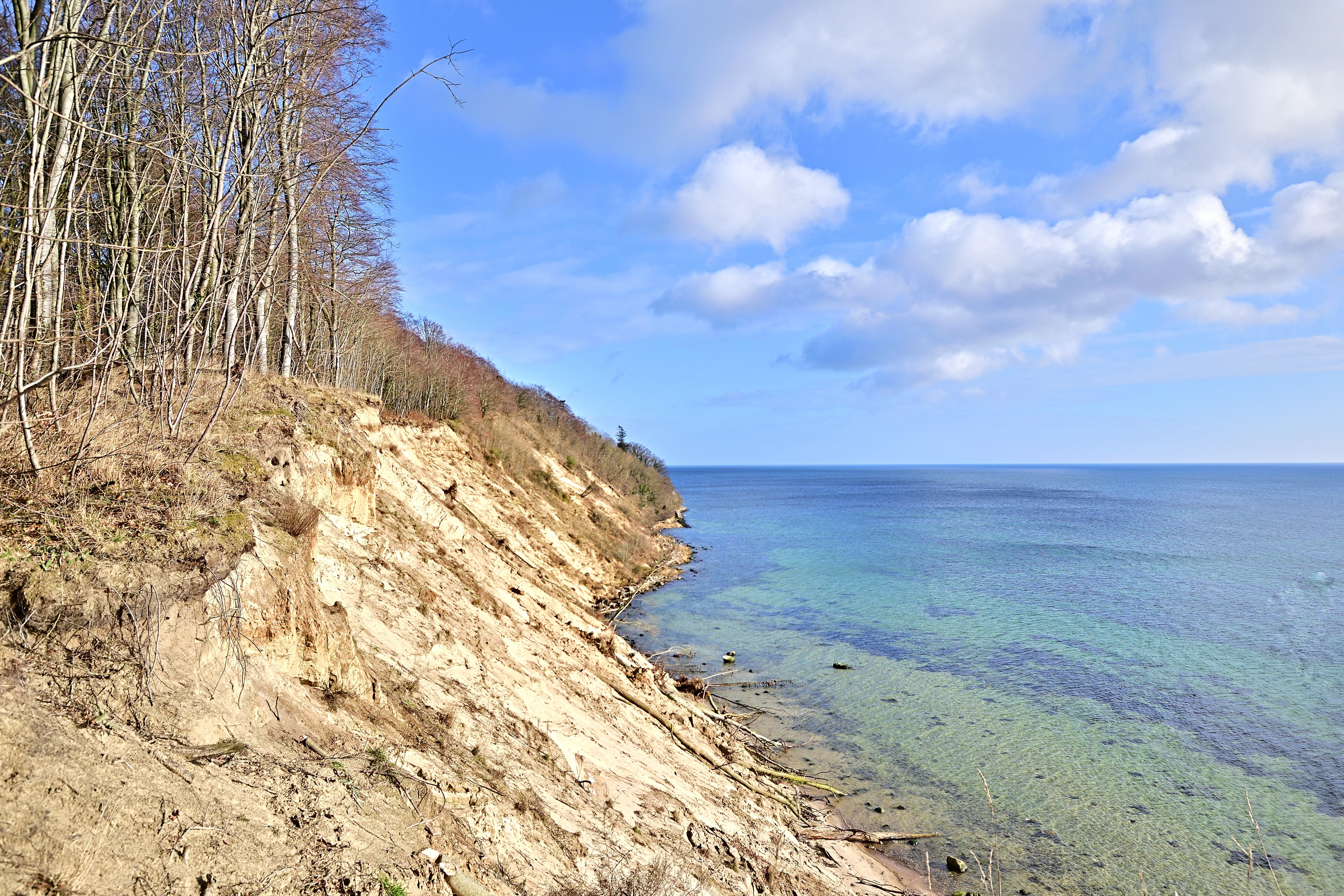
View from the Nordperd
