= Hessenlager =

Former French military encampment

Coordinates: 54.334931°N 13.737094°E

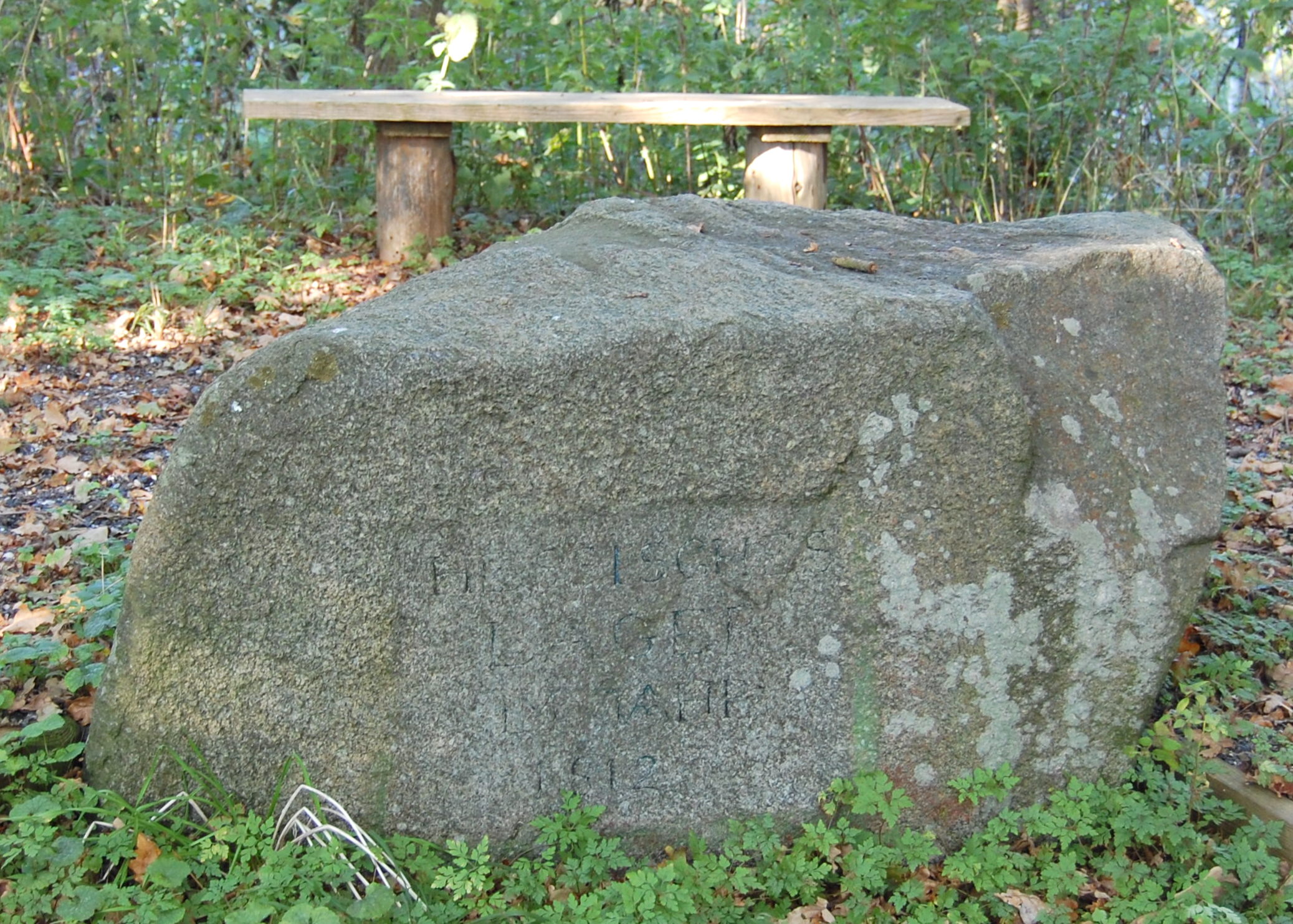
Monument to the Hessian Camp in Göhren

The Hessenlager or Hessian Camp is a former military encampment established by Hessian-Darmstadt troops during the French occupation near Göhren on the German island of Rügen.

== Location ==
The camp was located south of Göhren in the vicinity of the south beach immediately west of the road from Göhren to Lobbe. Somewhat further east is the Baltic Sea. The camp was constructed in 1812. Today only remnants of the earthworks have survived; they have been designated as a heritage site and run parallel to the road. The former encampment is commemorated at the highest point of the earthworks by a rock with the inscription Hessisches Lager im Jahre 1812 ("Hessian Camp in 1812"). In addition, an information board has been set up. Diagonally opposite is the museum ship, Luise.

== History ==
The tented camp on the shores of the Baltic Sea was erected by two companies of Hesse-Darmstadt troops in a wood. The troops belonged to those states in the Confederation of the Rhine that were allied to Napoleonic France. Strategically, the camp had the aim of preventing the landing of British troops on Rügen. There was an encampment laid out for 100 men and a dugout, which was covered with straw and branches. In the centre, an oblong space was created, which was laid out with walkways and grass banks and was described as clean. In addition, a large earth pyramid was built, but there is no trace of it today. The purpose of the pyramid is unclear. It may have served as a signal station or lookout. According to local oral tradition, the discipline of these troops was much better than that of English, Bavarian, Berg and French troops who, at that time, were also periodically stationed in the Mönchgut region. Behind the camp, tradesmen supplied provisions to the soldiers from their stalls.

The area where the camp was erected had previously been known as Slötel (="key").

== Literature ==
- Ingrid Schmidt: Hünengrab und Opferstein : Bodendenkmale auf der Insel Rügen. Hinstorff, Rostock, 2001, ISBN 3-356-00917-6, page 95 ff.
