= Selliner See =

Selliner See may refer to:

- Selliner See (Neukloster)
- Selliner See (Rügen)
