= Mönchgut Coastal Fishing Museum =

Coordinates: 54°21′13.6″N 13°41′53.8″E

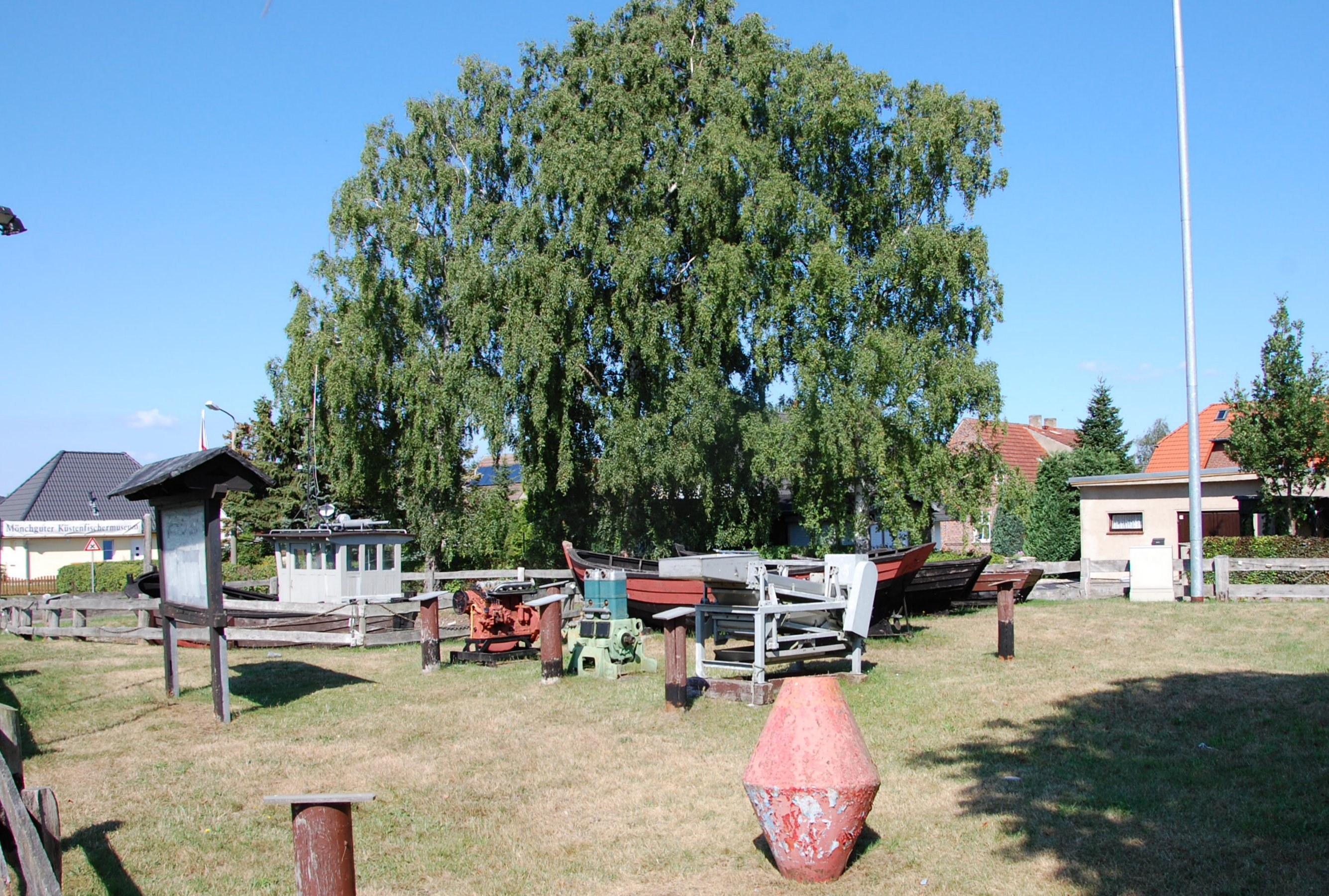
Coastal Fishing Museum in Baabe, Rugia Island

Mönchgut Coastal Fishing Museum, Rügen

The Mönchgut Coastal Fishing Museum (German: Mönchguter Küstenfischermuseum) in the German Baltic Sea resort of Baabe shows the methods of production used by fishermen living on Mönchgut, who were influential boat builders. The museum opened on 2 June 2001.

The exhibits include, among others, the 9.20 m long motorboat Ossi. The parish of Baabe acquired it after it was decommissioned, along with many other fishing boats built in Baabe. In addition, the museum displays so-called Motorreusenboote - motor boats with bow nets, including the Polk (an Anlandungsboot) complete with its original traps. The exhibition also includes a herring sorting machine, information boards about fishing and boat building as well as personalities of the local fishery.

The museum is open all-year round.
