= Mönchgut (municipality) =

- Municipality
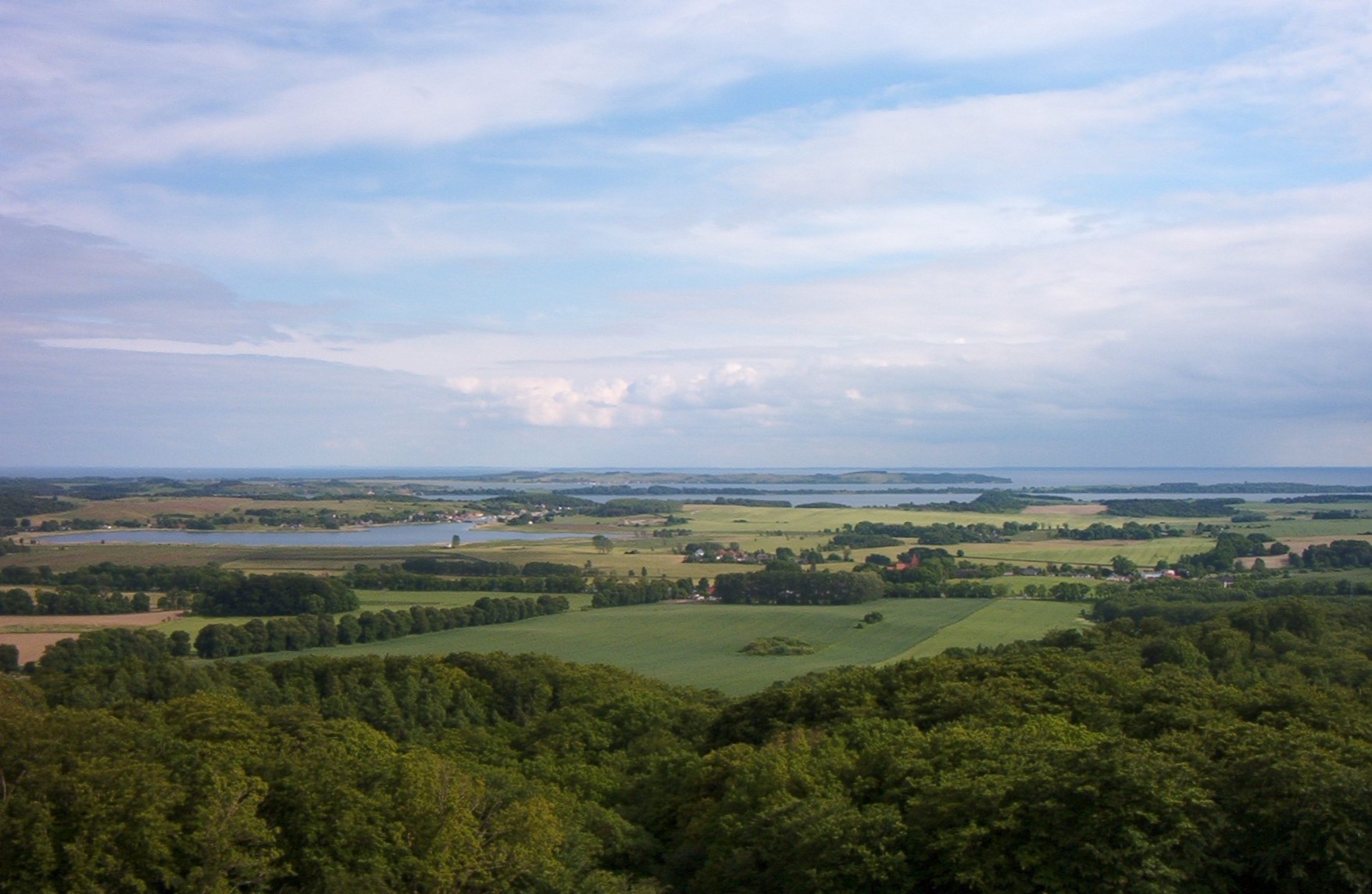
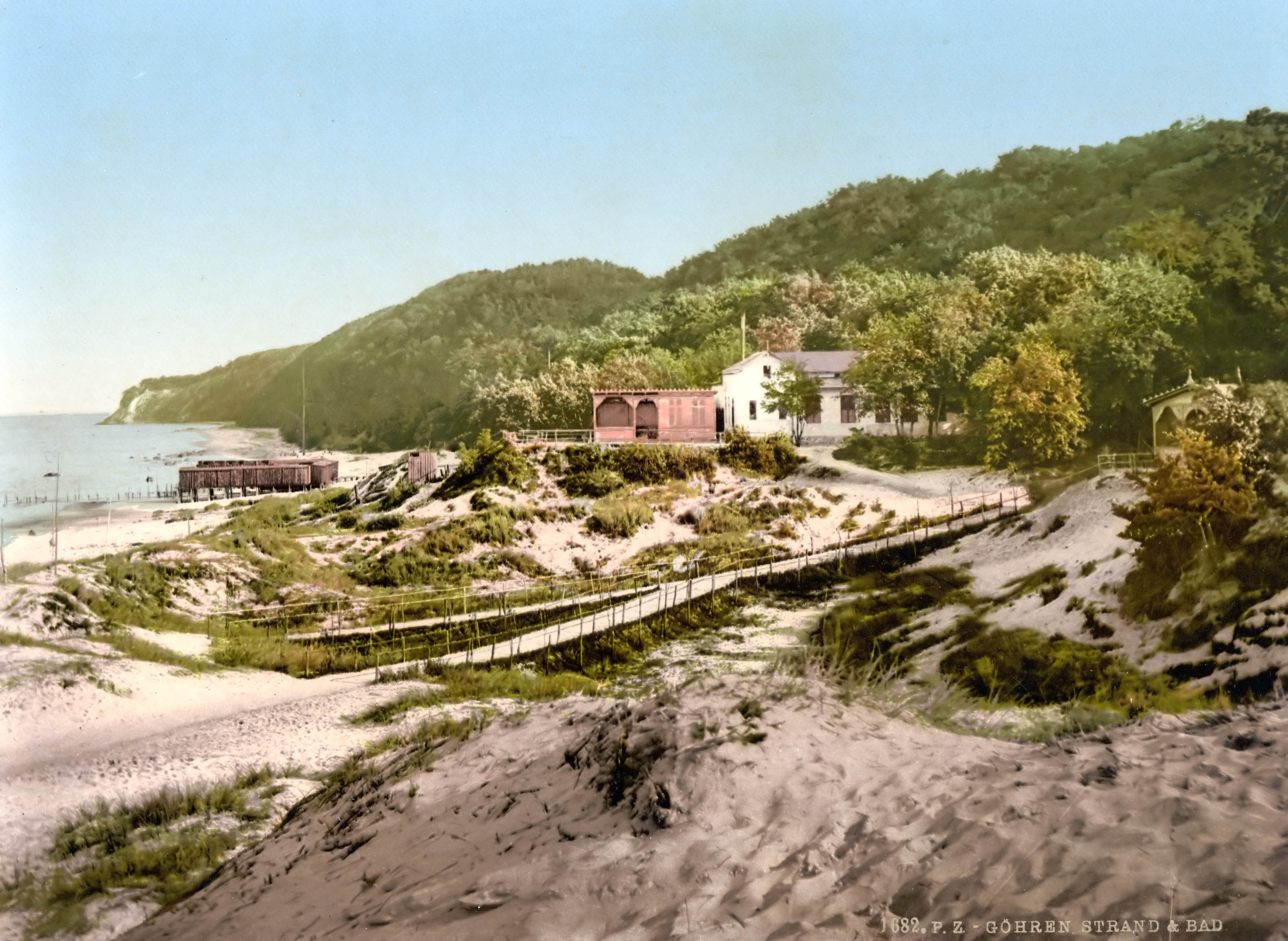
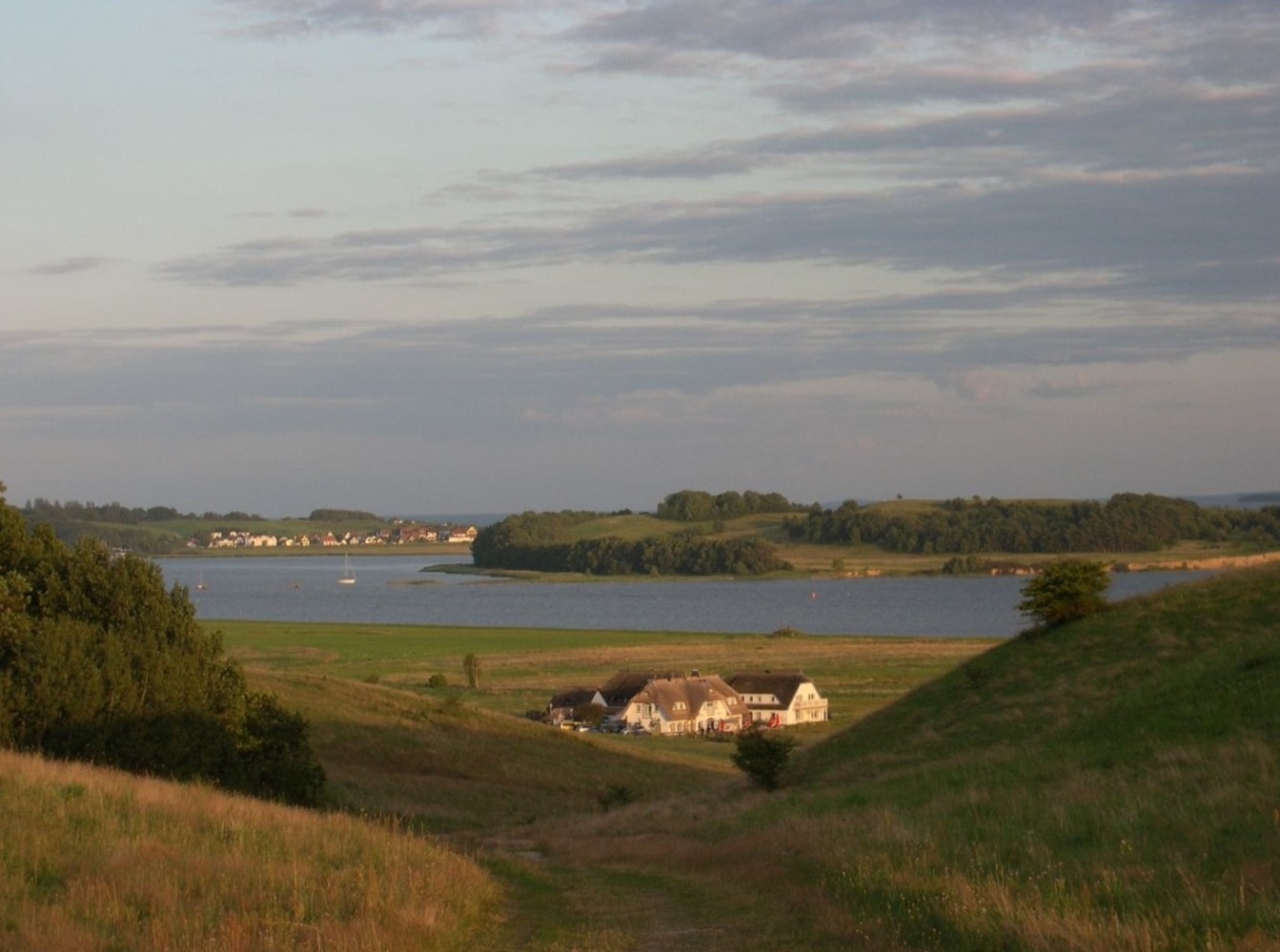
- Mönchgut landscape seen from the Granitz Hunting Lodge atop a hill. Historical Postcard from the Beach of Göhren, circa 1890-1900. Typical landscapes of Mönchgut.

- Location of Mönchgut within Vorpommern-Rügen district
- Interactive map of Mönchgut
- Location within Germany Location within Mecklenburg-Vorpommern
- Coordinates: 54°18′N 13°41′E
- Country: Germany
- State: Mecklenburg-Vorpommern
- District: Vorpommern-Rügen
- Municipal assoc.: Mönchgut-Granitz

Government
  - Mayor: Detlef Besch

Area
  - Total: 20.68 km^{2} (7.98 sq mi)
- Elevation: 3 m (9.8 ft)

Population (2025-12-31)
  - Total: 1,316
  - Density: 63.64/km^{2} (164.8/sq mi)
- Time zone: UTC+01:00 (CET)
  - Summer (DST): UTC+02:00 (CEST)
- Postal codes: 18586
- Dialling codes: 038308
- Vehicle registration: VR
- Website: https://www.amt-moenchgut.de/ris/ti-5/

Mönchgut (German pronunciation: [ˈmœnçɡuːt]) is a municipality in the district of Vorpommern-Rügen, in Mecklenburg-Vorpommern, Germany. It was created with effect from 1 January 2018 by the merger of the former municipalities of Gager, Middelhagen and Thiessow. Its name derives from the Mönchgut peninsula.
