= Reddevitz Höft =

Peninsular in Germany

Coordinates: 54°19′24.79″N 13°38′33.04″E

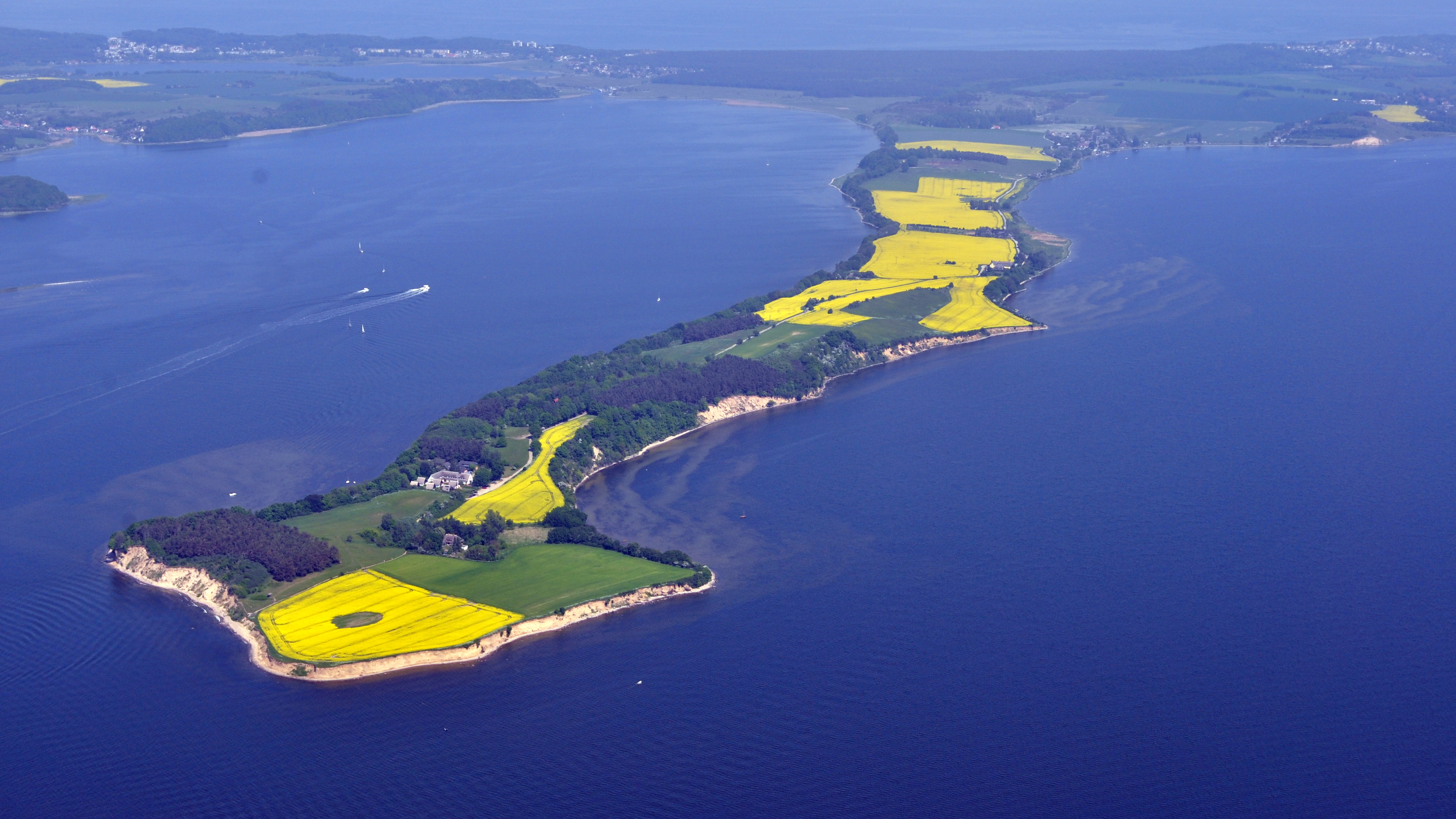
Reddevitz Höft looking east

The Reddevitz Höft or Reddevitzer Höft is a peninsular forming part of the German Baltic Sea island of Rügen. It is part of the Mönchgut peninsula, with which it is linked in the southeast by a good 130 metre wide isthmus. The Reddevitzer Höft is over four kilometres long and up to 500 metres wide. In its western part, which end in a cliffed coast, the land climbs to a height of over 33 metres. At the eastern end is the village of Alt Reddevitz, part of the municipality of Middelhagen. The namen is derived from the Low German word höft for "head".

In the north the Reddevitzer Höft borders on the Having and in the south on the Hagensche Wiek, to the west and southwest lies the Bay of Greifswald.

The peninsula, which lies within the Southeast Rügen Biosphere Reserve, is the largest contiguous stretch of heathland on the island of Rügen and is classed as a natural monument.

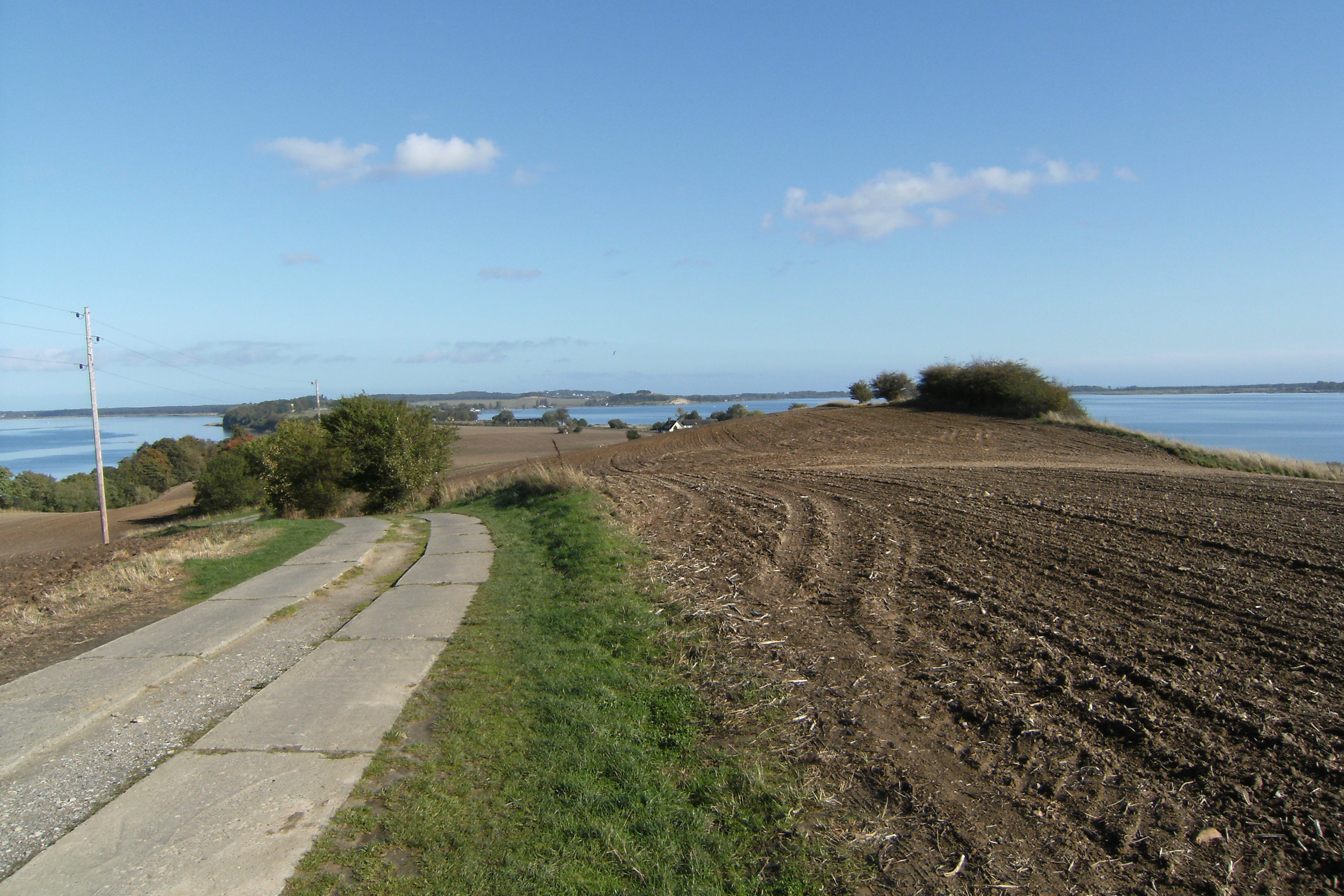
The Reddevitzer Höft

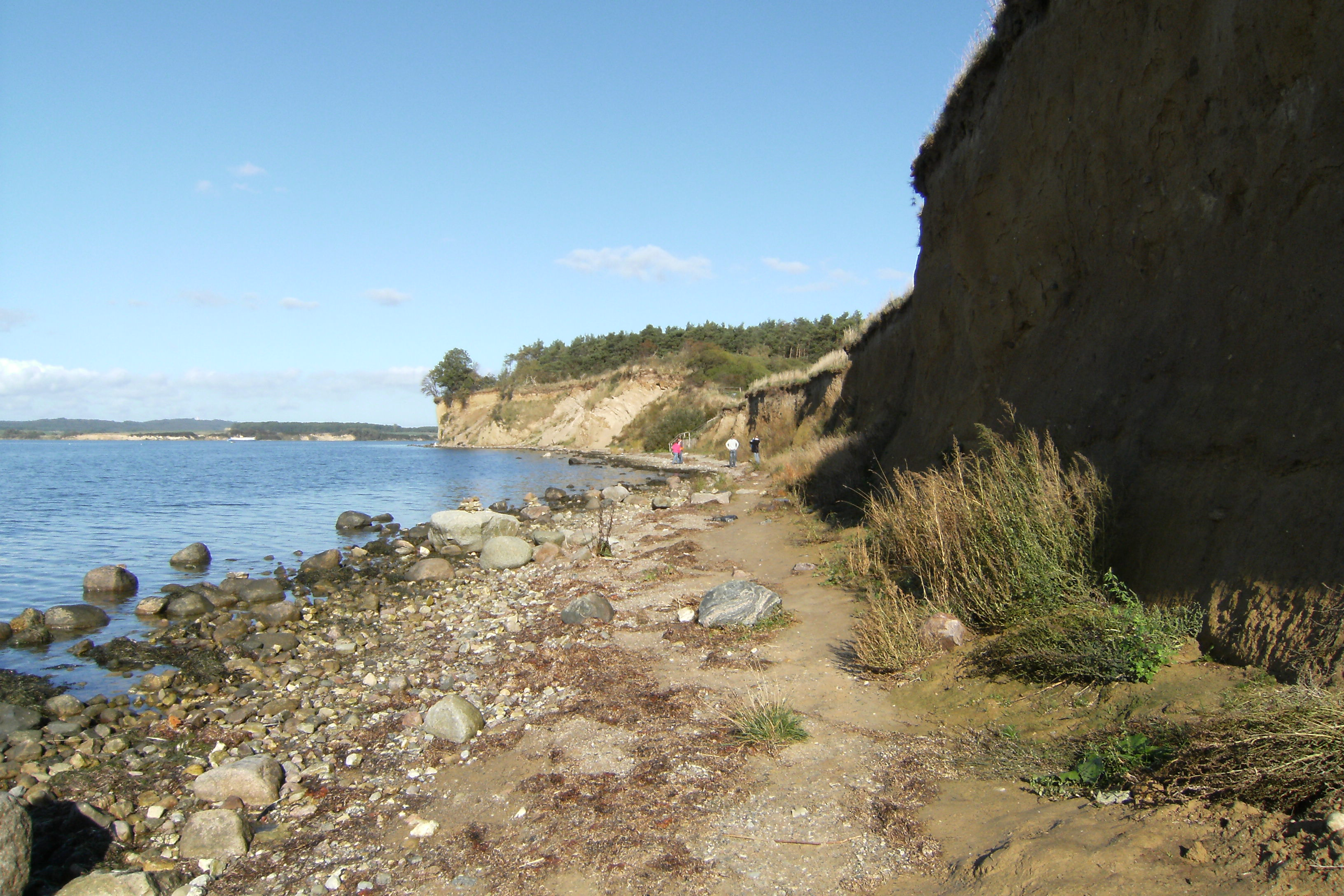
The Cliff at the Reddevitzer Höft

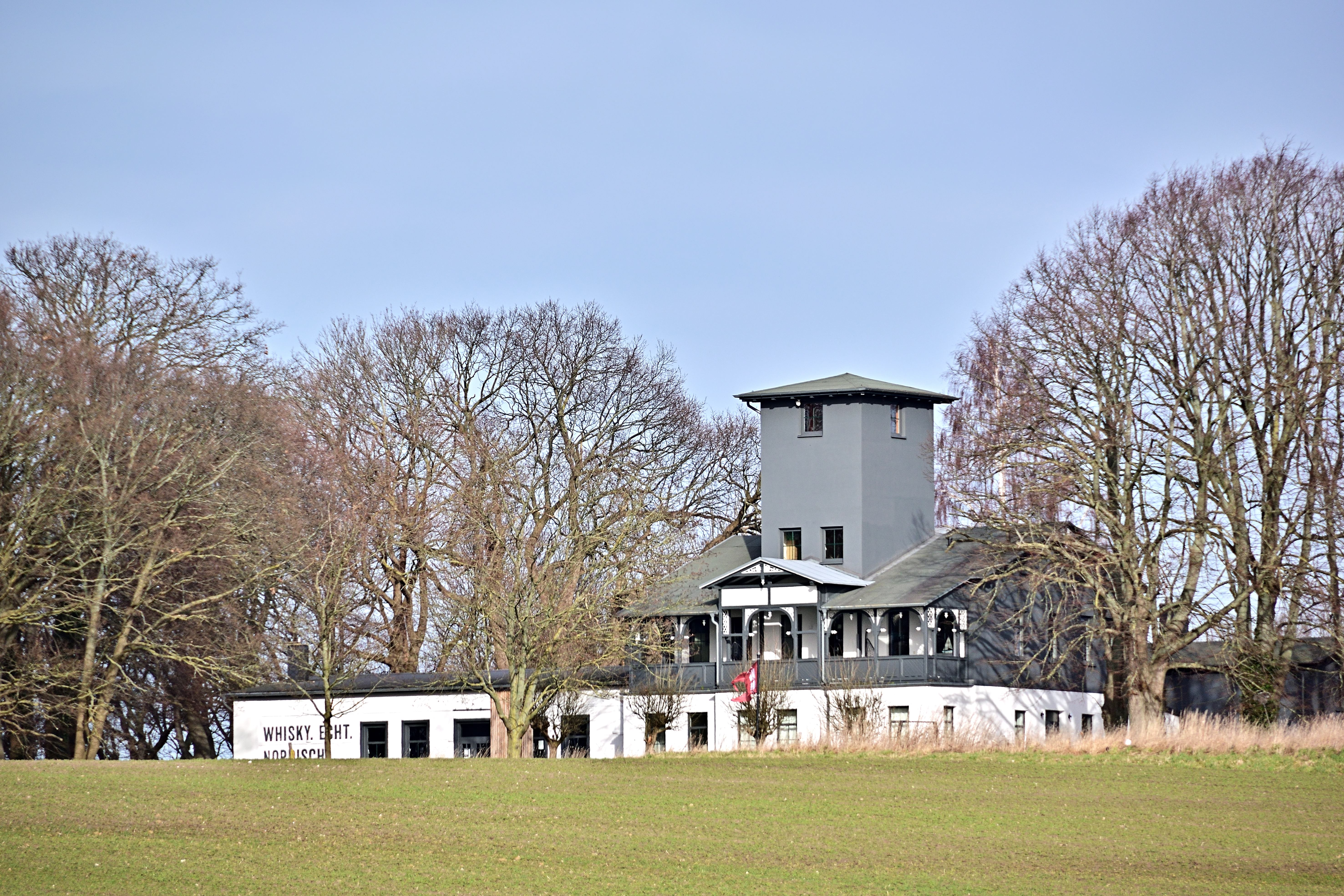
The Destillerie at the Reddevitzer Höft
