= Das Küstenrevier =

2024 German television crime series

- Genre: Drama
- Country of origin: Germany
- Original language: German
- No. of seasons: 1 Season
- No. of episodes: 80

Production
- Running time: 30-35 minutes

Original release
- Network: Sat.1

Das Küstenrevier (German: The coastal district) is a German television crime series that is broadcast on Mondays to Fridays on German free-to-air television channel Sat.1. It replaces Die Landarztpraxis (season 1) in its timeslot. It started on January 11, 2024. It ended its run on May 6, 2024.

== Plot ==
Harry's territory receives unexpected support from his own family, as his daughter Hanna returns to her old home from Rostock with her 15-year-old son Benni. Hanna is now an experienced inspector herself. But what Harry doesn't know is that his daughter had a good reason for leaving Rostock as quickly as possible.

== Production ==
In June 2023, Sat.1 announced the production of two new series for the evening program, The Country Doctor's Practice (Die Landarztpraxis) and The Coastal Commissariat, which will be shown from 2024. Initially 60 episodes were ordered. Filming began in November 2023. The name of the series was then changed from The Coastal Commissioner to The Coastal Revier (Das Küstenrevier). It was also announced that the number of episodes had been increased from 60 to 80. The production was carried out by Pajama Pictures on the island of Rügen in the municipality of Baabe

The premiere was given on 11 January 2024 at the 7 p.m. time slot, where the series is intended to replace Die Landarztpraxis.

Due to poor ratings, it was announced that the series would end its run after one season.

== Cast ==
- Till Demtrøder : Harry Stein
- Vanessa Eckart Hanna Stein
- Manuel Santos Gelke: Benni
- Tia Hyun: Tia Kramer
