= Gager (municipality) =

- Ortsteil of Mönchgut
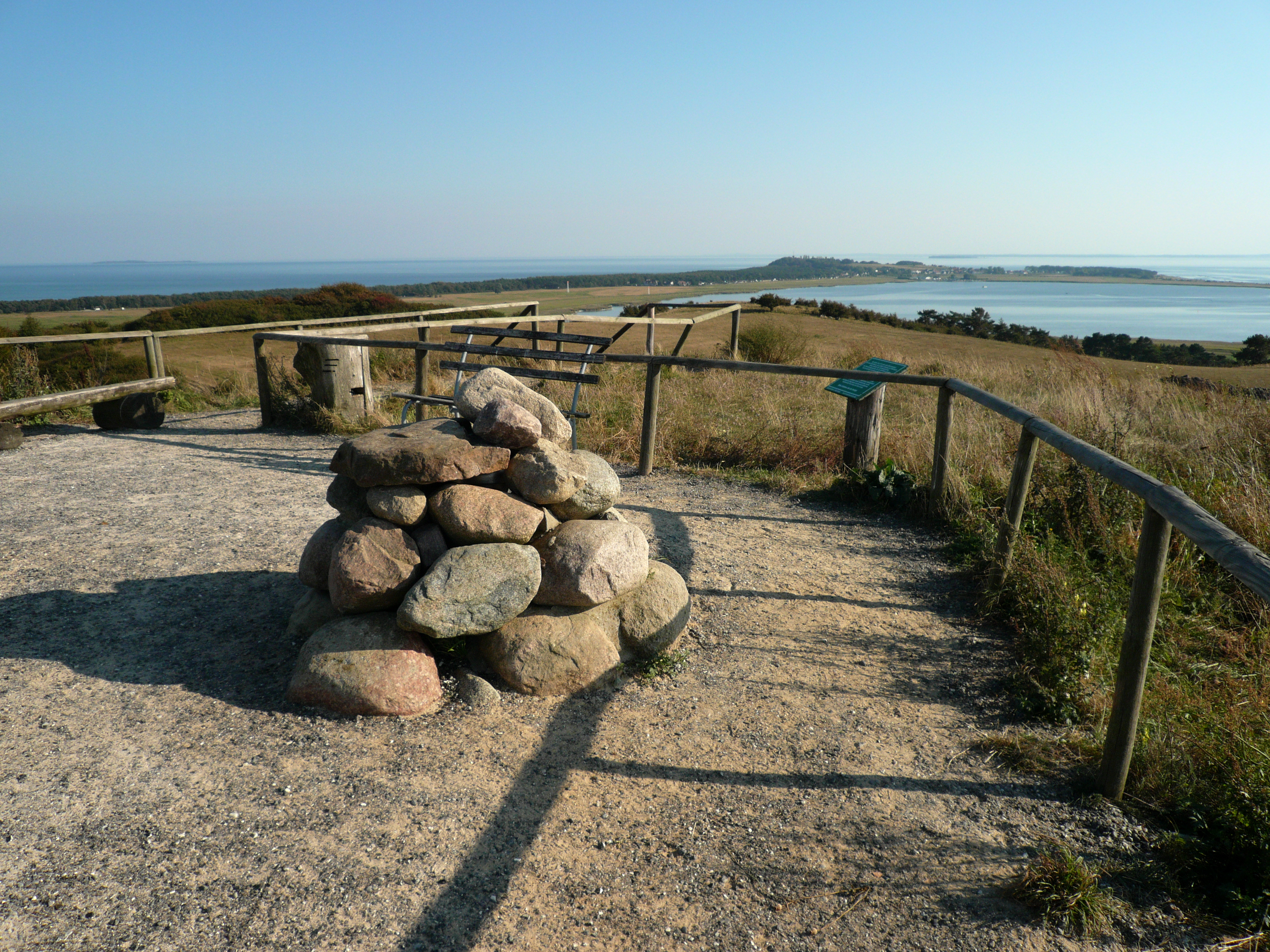
- Bakenberg near Gager
- Interactive map of Gager
- Location within Germany Location within Mecklenburg-Vorpommern
- Coordinates: 54°18′N 13°41′E
- Country: Germany
- State: Mecklenburg-Vorpommern
- District: Vorpommern-Rügen
- Municipality: Mönchgut

Area
  - Total: 8.69 km^{2} (3.36 sq mi)
- Elevation: 3 m (9.8 ft)

Population (2015-12-31)
  - Total: 388
  - Density: 44.6/km^{2} (116/sq mi)
- Time zone: UTC+01:00 (CET)
  - Summer (DST): UTC+02:00 (CEST)
- Postal codes: 18586
- Dialling codes: 038308
- Vehicle registration: RÜG

Gager (German pronunciation: [ˈɡaːɡɐ]) is a village and a former municipality in the Vorpommern-Rügen district, in Mecklenburg-Vorpommern, Germany. Since January 2018, it is part of the new municipality Mönchgut. Besides Gager, the municipality also included the villages Groß Zicker and Groß Zicker Ausbau.

== History ==
The place was part of the Principality of Rugen to 1326 and then the Duchy of Pomerania.

With the 1648 Treaty of Westphalia, Rügen and thus also Gager became part of Swedish Pomerania. In 1815 the town became part of the Prussian Province of Pomerania.

Since 1818 Gager belonged to the Kreis or district Rügen. Only in the years 1952 to 1955 it was part of Kreis Putbus.

Following the Division of Germany and establishment of the German Democratic Republic, a summer camp was operated in Groß Zicker. Following the German reunification in 1990, it became part of the state Mecklenburg-Vorpommern. The district Rügen was merged into the new district Vorpommern-Rügen in 2011.

In 1980, the movie was filmed The Three Other Seasons (German: Die 3 anderen Jahreszeiten) about the two villages and the lives of the villagers. The 1976 fairytale film The Blue Light (German: Das blaue Licht) was filmed among others in the landscapes of the peninsula.

== Economy ==
The economy of Gager is mainly dominated by tourism.
