= Göhren, Rügen =

Göhren
- Municipality
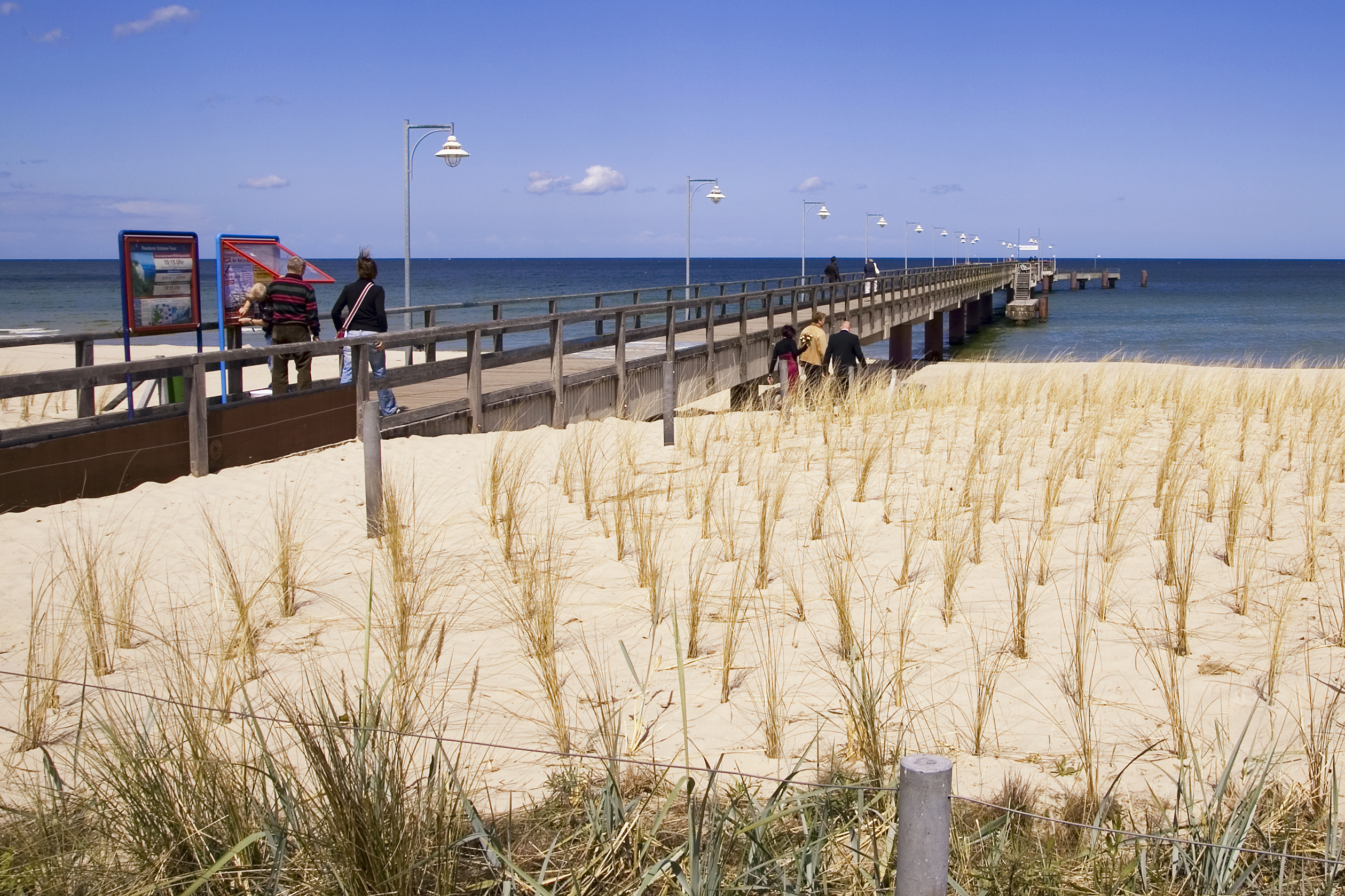
- Pier of Göhren on Rügen Island

- Location of Göhren within Vorpommern-Rügen district
- Interactive map of Göhren
- Location within Germany Location within Mecklenburg-Vorpommern
- Coordinates: 54°20′N 13°44′E
- Country: Germany
- State: Mecklenburg-Vorpommern
- District: Vorpommern-Rügen
- Municipal assoc.: Mönchgut-Granitz

Government
  - Mayor: Olaf Neugebauer (CDU)

Area
  - Total: 7.42 km^{2} (2.86 sq mi)
- Elevation: 0 m (0 ft)

Population (2025-12-31)
  - Total: 1,388
  - Density: 187/km^{2} (484/sq mi)
- Time zone: UTC+01:00 (CET)
  - Summer (DST): UTC+02:00 (CEST)
- Postal codes: 18586
- Dialling codes: 038303, 038308
- Vehicle registration: RÜG
- Website: www.amt-moenchgut.de

Göhren (German pronunciation: [ˈɡøːʁən]) is a municipality in the Vorpommern-Rügen district, in Mecklenburg-Vorpommern, Germany.

== Geography ==
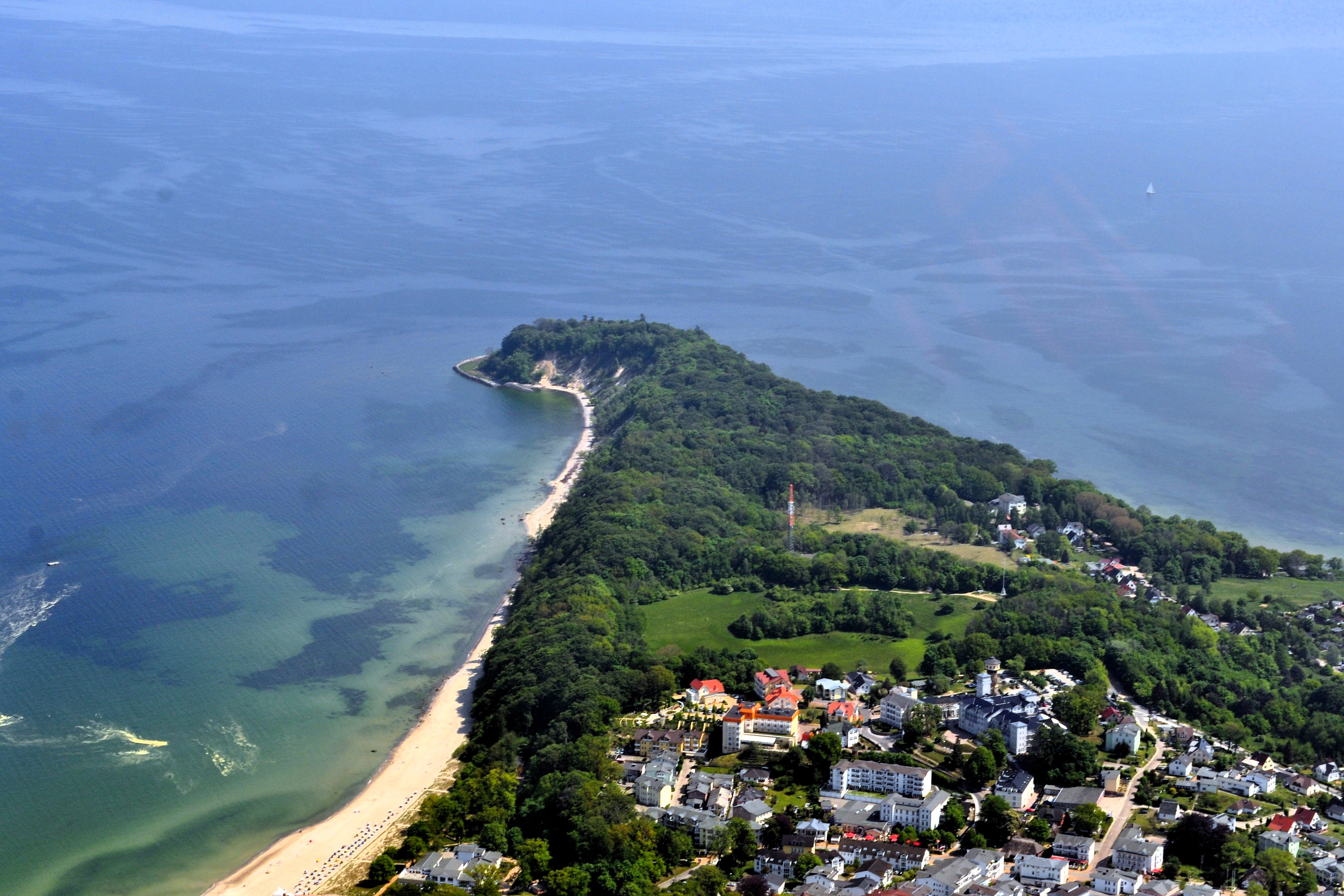
Göhren (2011)

The municipality of Göhren adjoins the easternmost point of the island of Rugen: Cape Nordperd. It separates the North Beach (Nordstrand) from the South Beach (Südstrand). The North Beach is the actual bathing beach with a seaside promenade. Between Göhren Pier and the Nordperd lies the Buskam, the largest glacial erratic boulder in North Germany, which rises one metre about the sea.

== Sights ==
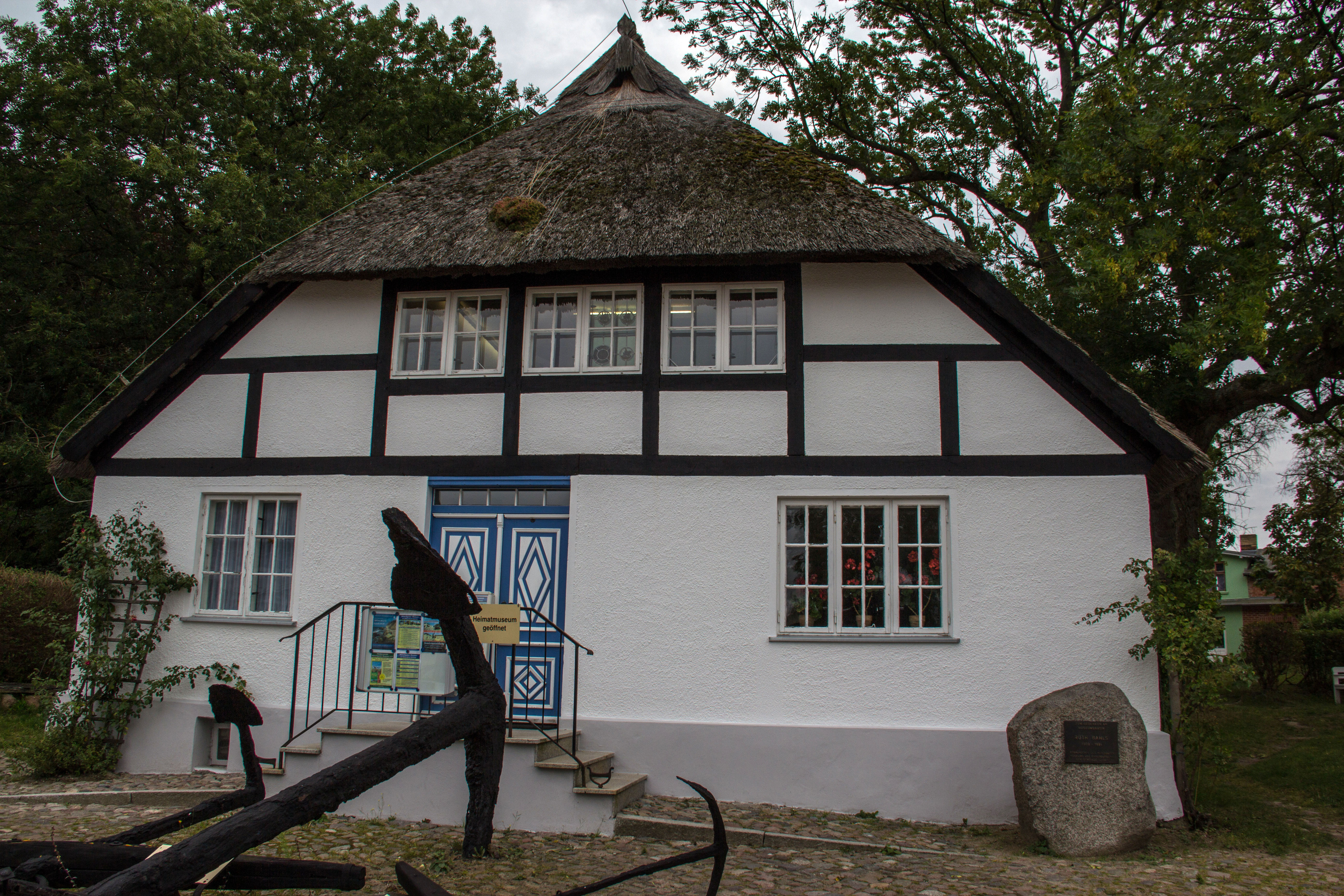
The local history museum in Göhren

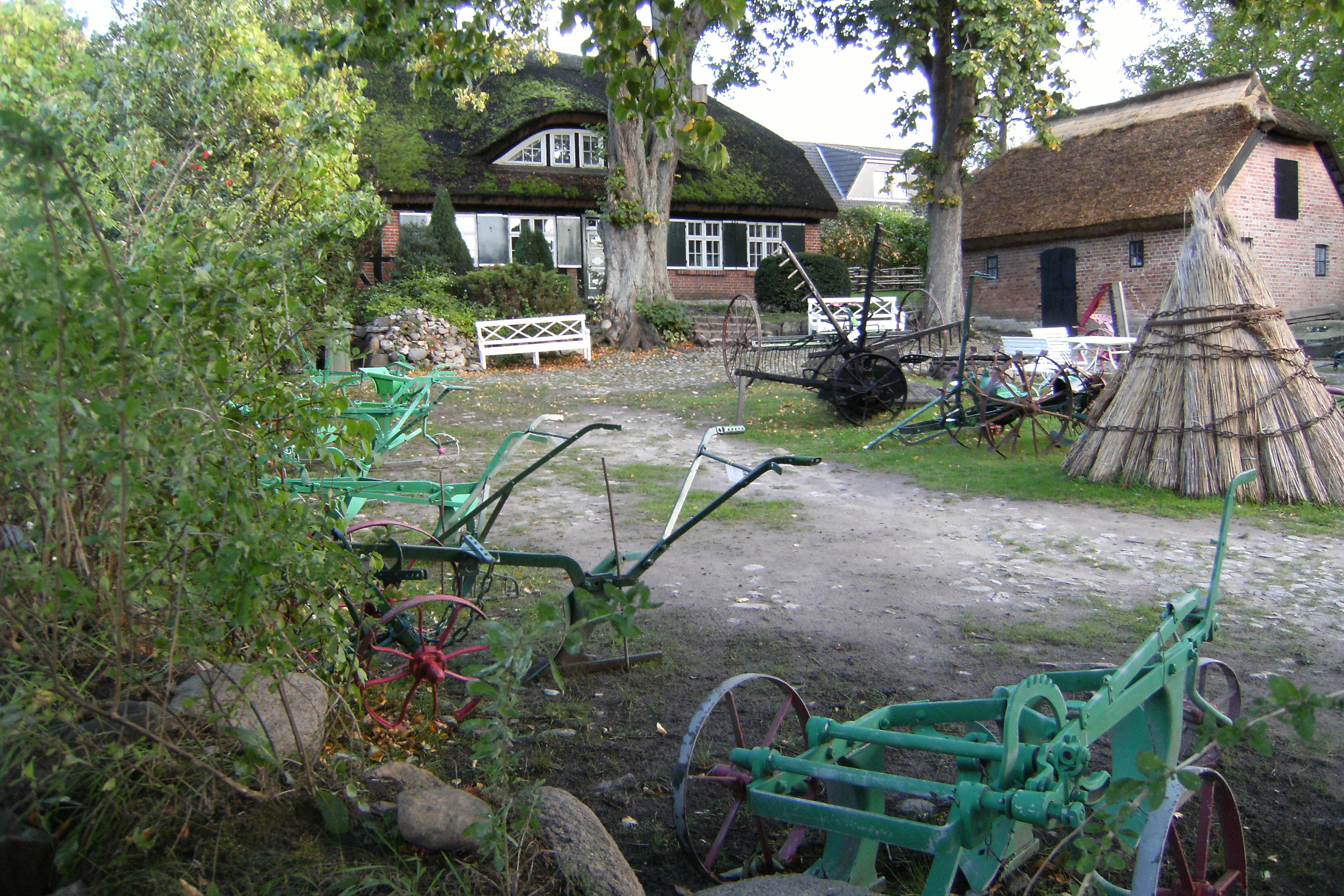
Museum railway station at Göhren

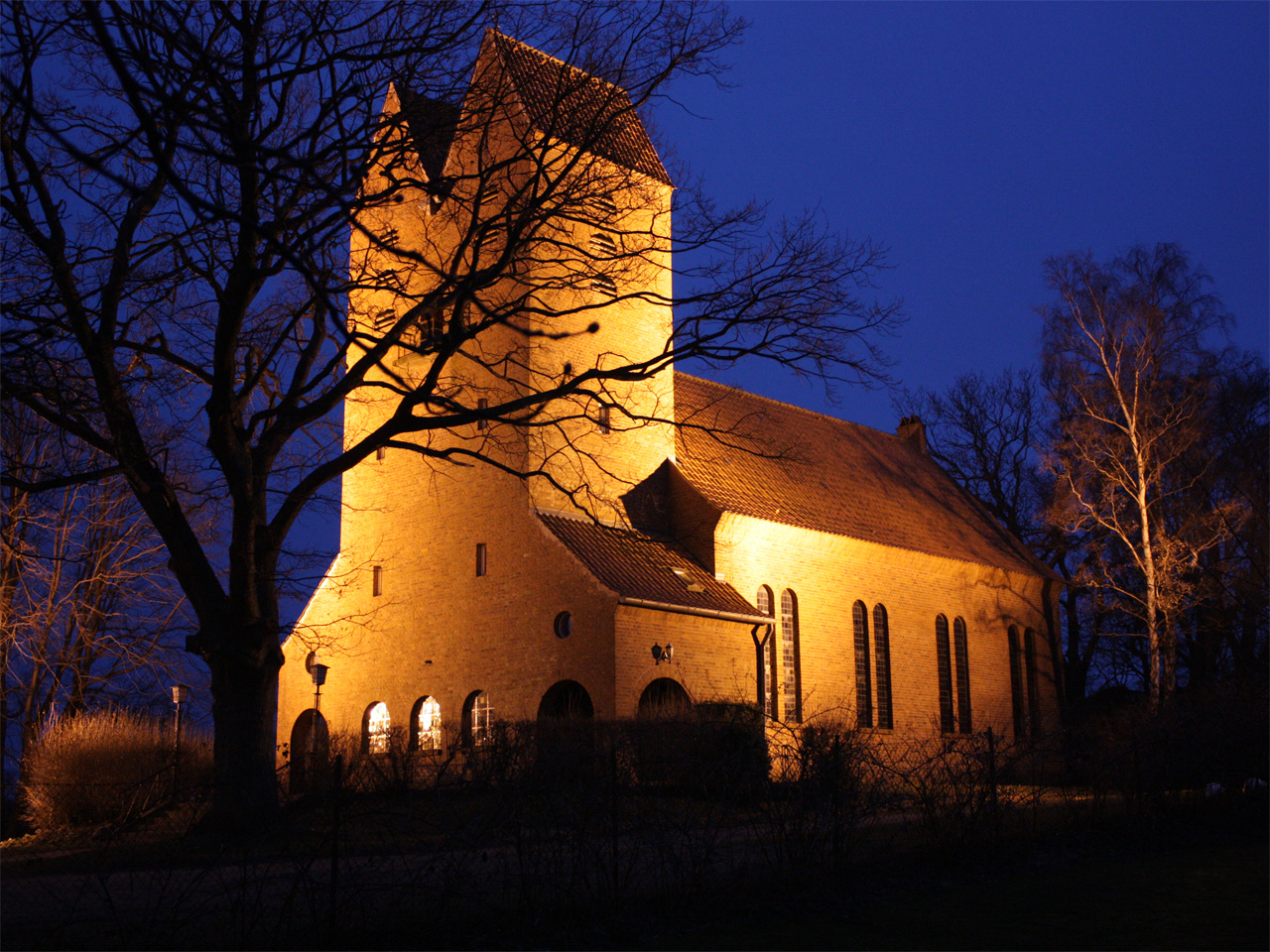
The church in Göhren

- Göhren Pier was rebuilt in the 1990s. It is 270 metres long.
- Speckbusch Barrow (Hügelgrab Speckbusch) is next to Göhren church and dates to the Bronze Age.
- The Mönchguter Museums are four museums that are protected and, together, form an open-air museum. There is a local history museum, the motor yacht Luise, the museum farm (since 1973), and a thatched fisherman's house, the Rookhuus.
- The Drachenhaus was the last home and workshop of the "Poet of the Baltic" and important playwright, Max Dreyer.
- Buskam: the largest glacial erratic in Germany is located ca. 300 metres offshore, east of Göhren.
- Memorial for the victims of Action Rose in 1953 on the Baltic Sea (Hotel Seestern, Poststraße 10)
- Göhren Village Church dates to the 20th century (1929/30).
- The area monument, the Hessenlager, on the road to Lobbe is an 1812 military camp.
- The beaches have a total length of 5 km and merge into each other.
  - North Beach (Nordstrand): up to 30-metre-wide, white, fine-sand beach with a 270-metre-long pier
  - South Beach (Südstrand): rockier and narrower beach, which runs to Lobbe.
