= Die Landarztpraxis =

2023 German television soap opera

- Genre: Drama
- Country of origin: Germany
- Original language: German
- No. of seasons: 4 Seasons
- No. of episodes: 326 episodes Episodes broadcast

Production
- Running time: 30-35 minutes

Original release
- Network: Sat.1
- Release: 16 October 2023 – present

Die Landarztpraxis (German) "The Country doctor's practice" is a German Daily-Drama/Soap opera that has been broadcast since October 16, 2023, Mondays to Fridays at 7:00 p.m. on Sat.1. The first season end on January 10, 2024 and getting replaced by Das Küstenrevier in its timeslot. The second season started on May 7. 2024.

The series was renewed for a second season.

In 2024, the series was renewed for a third season.

== Plot ==
In the Bavarian idyll of Wiesenkirchen am Schliersee, the Country Doktor Dr. Sarah König treats farmers, mountaineers, holiday guests – and, if necessary, even a cow. Her heart beats for two men: her old love Dr. Fabian Kroiß and the mountain rescuer Max.

== Cast ==
- Caroline Frier: Dr Sarah König
- Oliver Franck: Fabian Kroiß
- Alexander Koll: Max Raichinger
