= Having (inlet) =

Inlet in Germany

Coordinates: 54°20′05″N 13°39′00″E

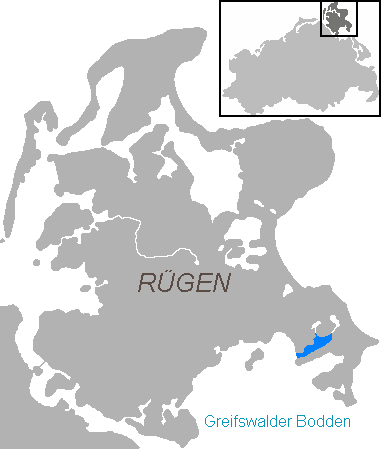
Location of Having

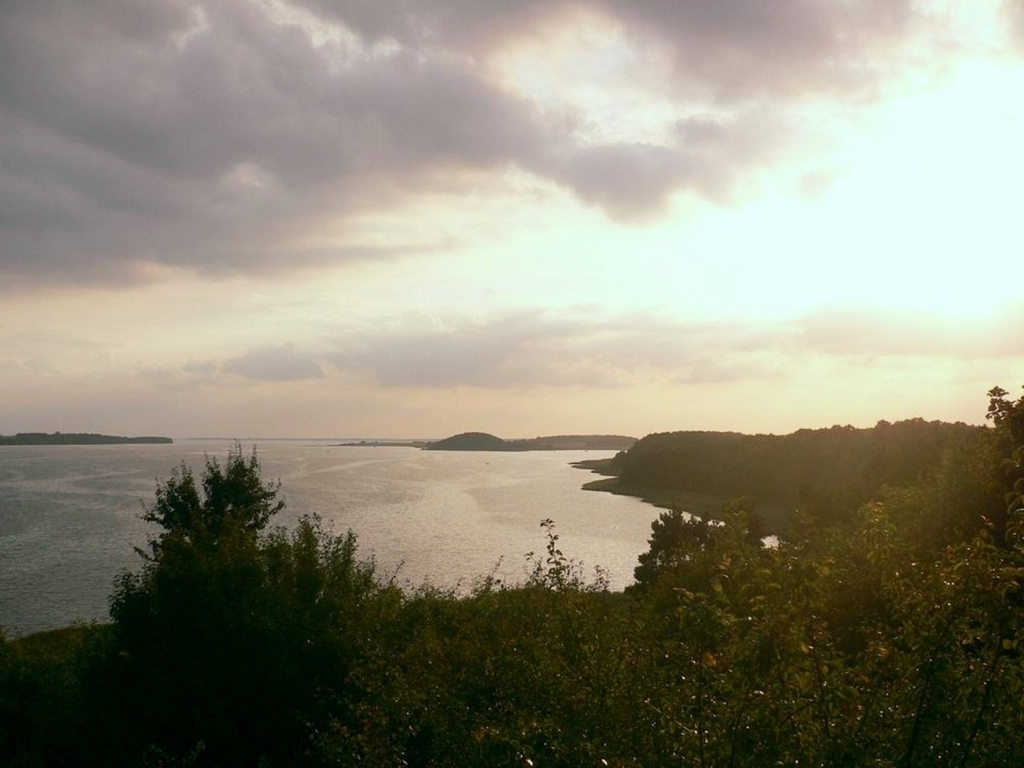
The Having, view from Moritzburg

The Having is an inlet in the northeast of the Rügischer Bodden, the northern half of the Bay of Greifswald, which cuts deeply into the peninsula of Mönchgut, the southeastern tip of the German island of Rügen.

The inlet is about 5.7 kilometres long, 1.1 kilometres wide and has an area of 7.5 km^{2}. It opens towards the southwest onto the Rügische Bodden. The Having is up to eight metres deep. In the south the Having is bounded by the narrow, elongated peninsula of Reddevitzer Höft, in the north by the Granitz. In the north there are two narrow waterways to the lakes of Selliner See and Neuensiener See. The heights around the bay climb to over 30 metres.

There are no settlements on the shores of the Having itself. The inlet is part of the Mönchgut Nature Reserve in the Southeast Rügen Biosphere Reserve.
