= Mönchgut-Granitz =

Amt in Mecklenburg-Vorpommern, Germany

- Amt
- Location of Mönchgut-Granitz within Vorpommern-Rügen district
- Interactive map of Mönchgut-Granitz
- Location within Germany Location within Mecklenburg-Vorpommern
- Coordinates: 54°21′N 13°42′E
- Country: Germany
- State: Mecklenburg-Vorpommern
- District: Vorpommern-Rügen
- Seat: Baabe
- Subdivisions: 6 municipalities

Area
  - Total: 84.35 km^{2} (32.57 sq mi)

Population (2025-12-31)
  - Total: 7,259
  - Density: 86.06/km^{2} (222.9/sq mi)
- Time zone: UTC+01:00 (CET)
  - Summer (DST): UTC+02:00 (CEST)
- Website: www.amt-altenpleen.de

Mönchgut-Granitz is an Amt in the district of Vorpommern-Rügen, in Mecklenburg-Vorpommern, Germany. The seat of the Amt is in Baabe.

The Amt Mönchgut-Granitz consists of the following municipalities:

1. Baabe
2. Göhren
3. Lancken-Granitz
4. Mönchgut
5. Sellin
6. Zirkow

== Gallery ==
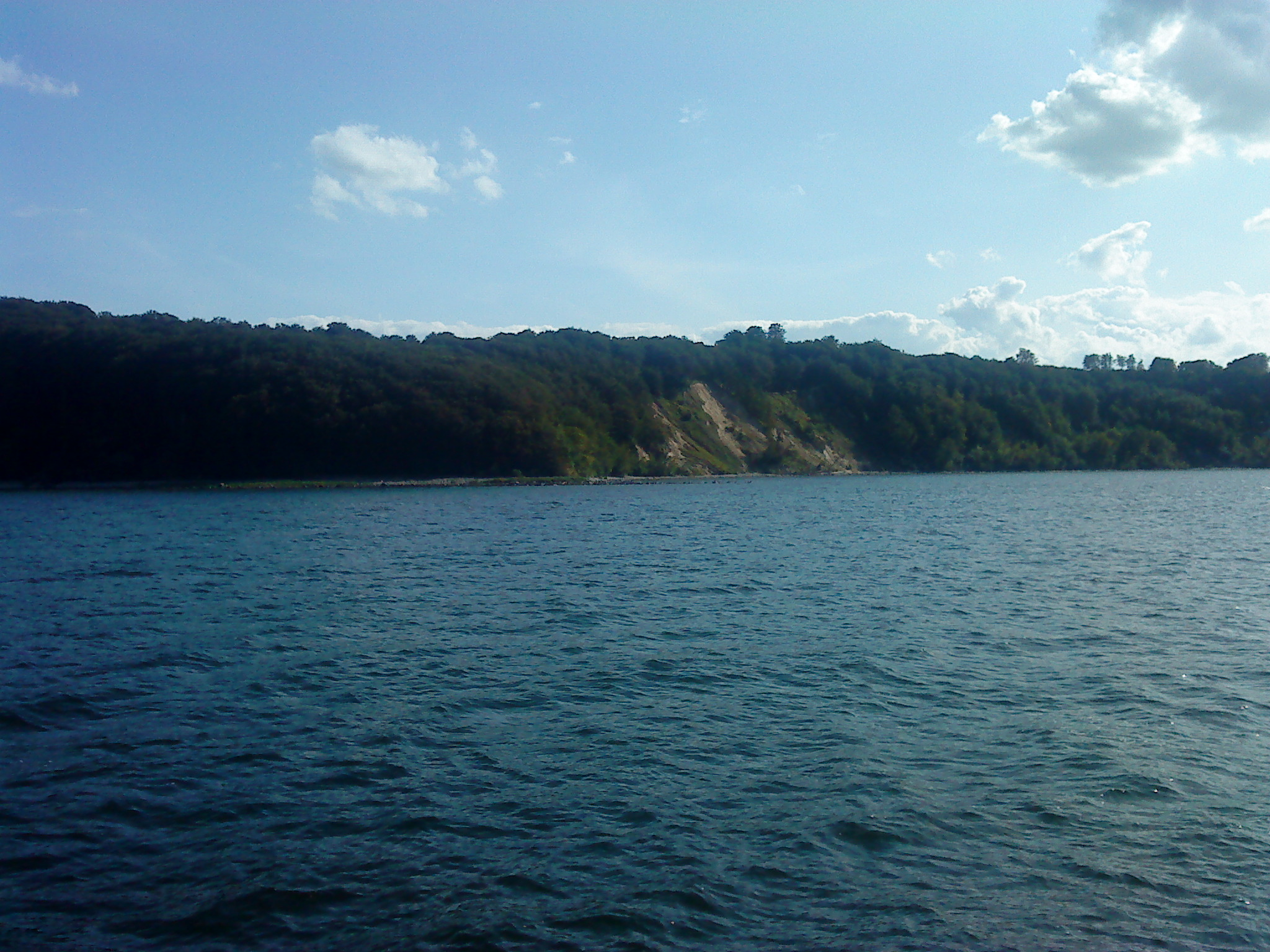
Granitz hills, seaside view

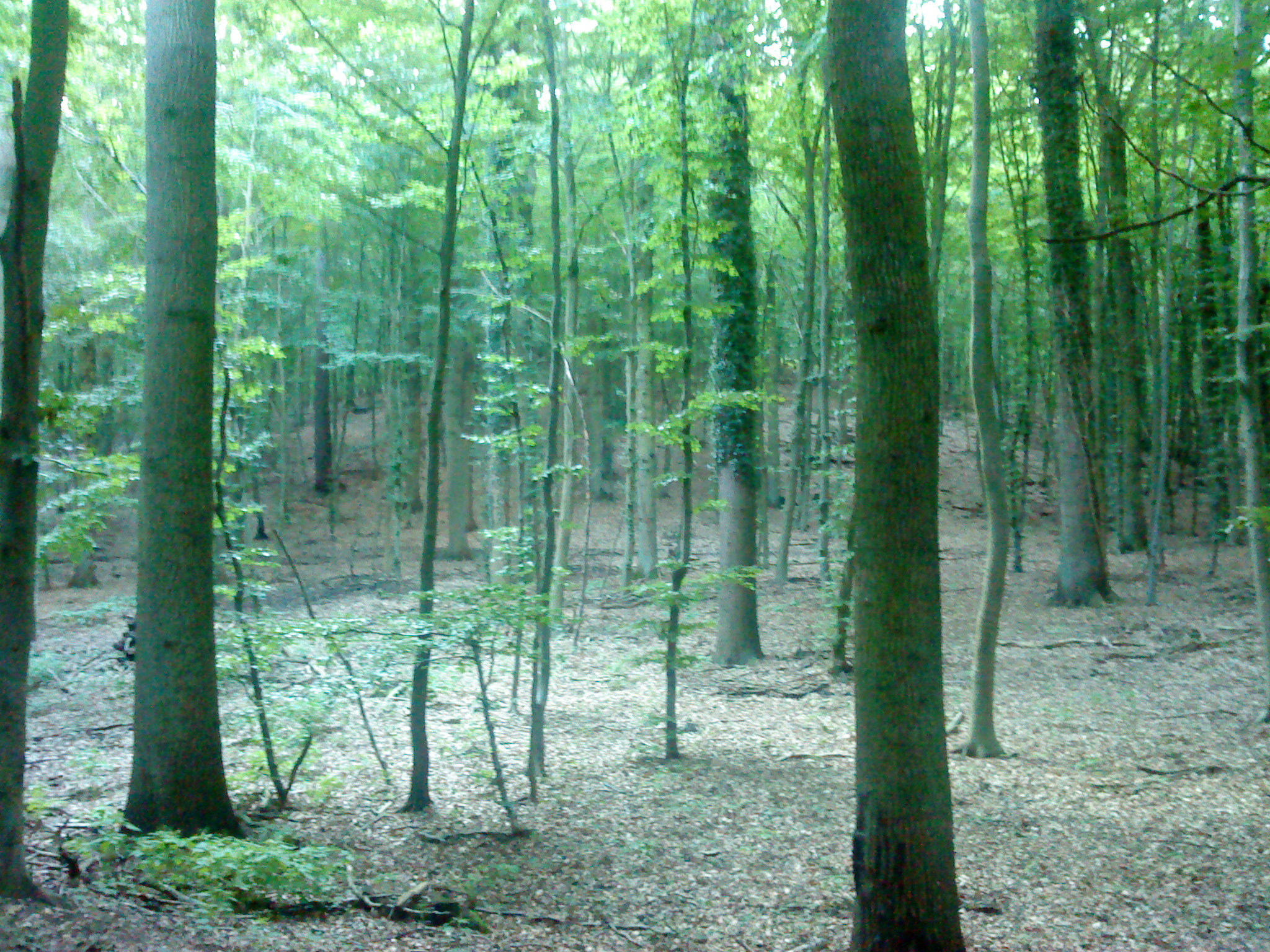
Granitz hills, woods

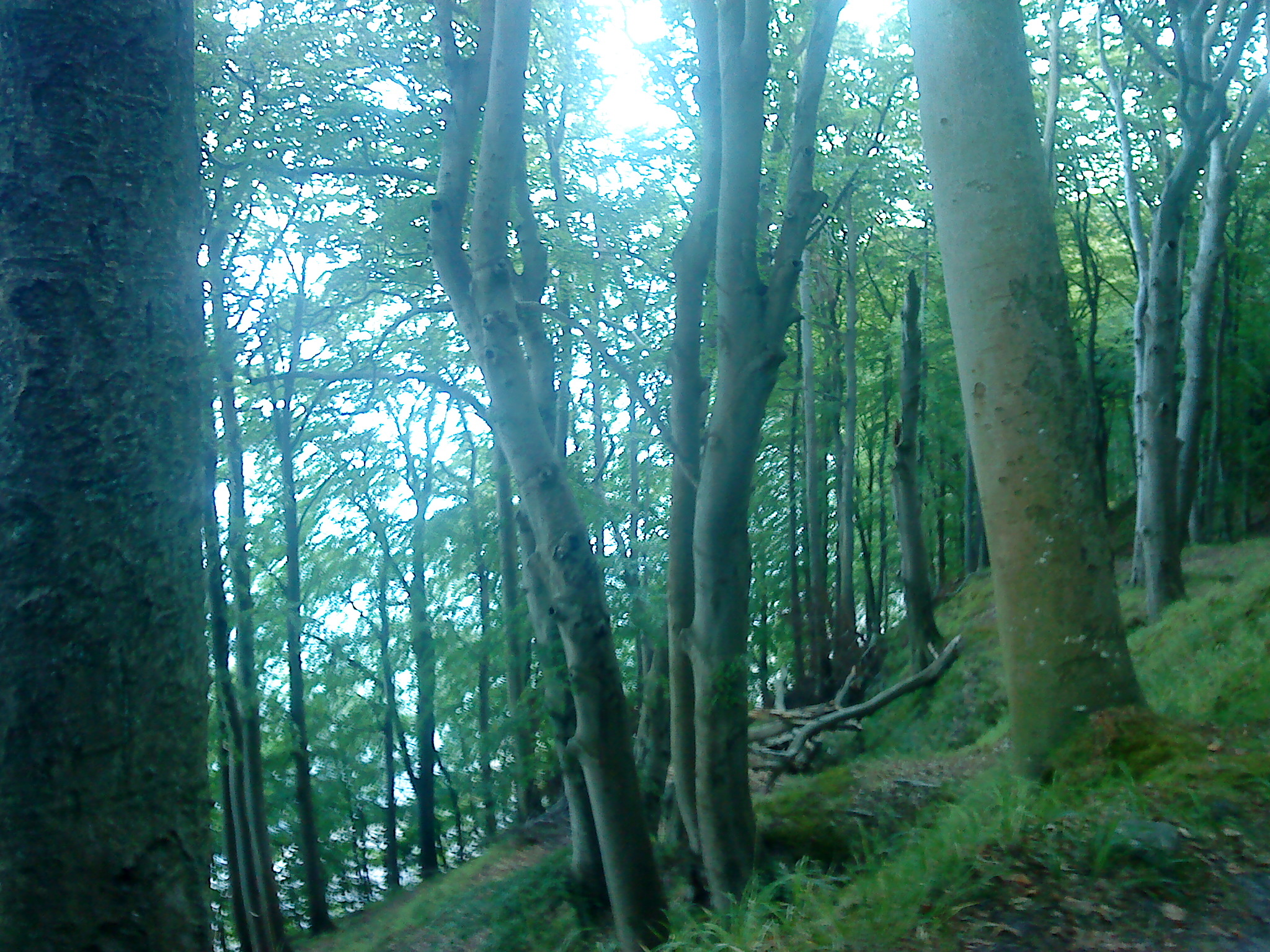
Granitz hills, woods, cliff
