= Selliner See (Neukloster) =

Lake in Germany

- Location within Mecklenburg-Vorpommern
- Location: Neukloster, Nordwestmecklenburg, Mecklenburg-Vorpommern
- Coordinates: 53.87608°N 11.62106°E
- Basin countries: Germany
- Surface area: 0.127 km^{2} (0.049 sq mi)
- Surface elevation: 48.5 m (159 ft)

Selliner See is a lake at Ravensruh, city of Neukloster in Nordwestmecklenburg, Mecklenburg-Vorpommern, Germany. At an elevation of 48.5 m, its surface area is 0.127 km².
