= Göhren Pier =

Pier in Göhren, Germany

Coordinates: 54.347287°N 13.743268°E

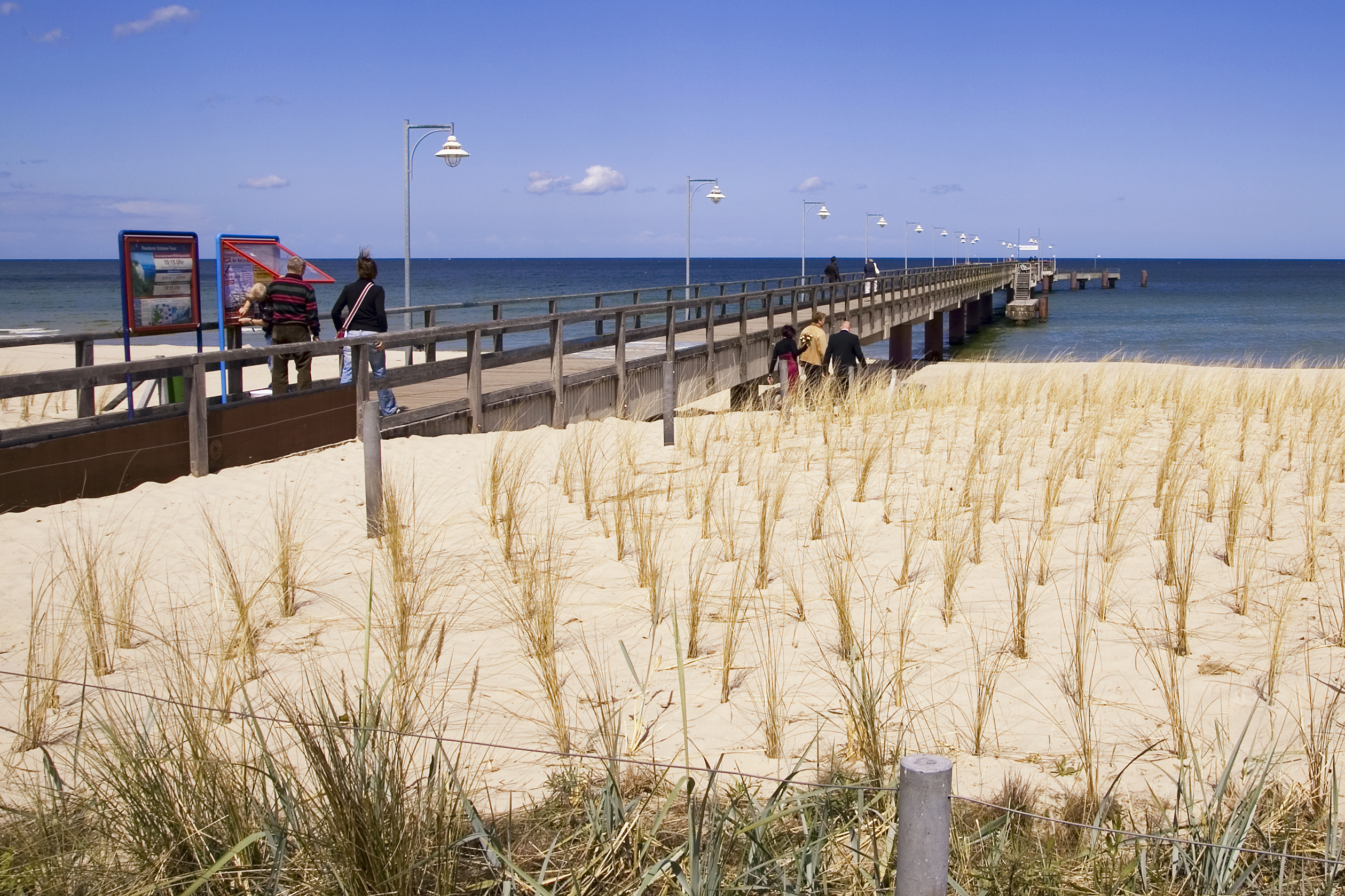
The pier at Göhren (2009)

Göhren Pier (German: Seebrücke Göhren) is a pier in the Baltic seaside resort of Göhren on the German island of Rügen.

The pier is 350 metres long, of which 270 metres projects into the Baltic Sea. The structure was built in 1993. Access is through a traditional, white-painted and green roofed pier house (Brückenhaus) onto the pier with its wooden decking. Cruise vessels dock at the landing stage at the end of the pier.

In 1898, a 1,002 metre long pier was built on Göhren's south beach. This was demolished during the First World War. On Göhren's north beach a 500 metre long pier had been erected; this was still being used in the early 1950s.
