= Middelhagen =

- Ortsteil of Mönchgut
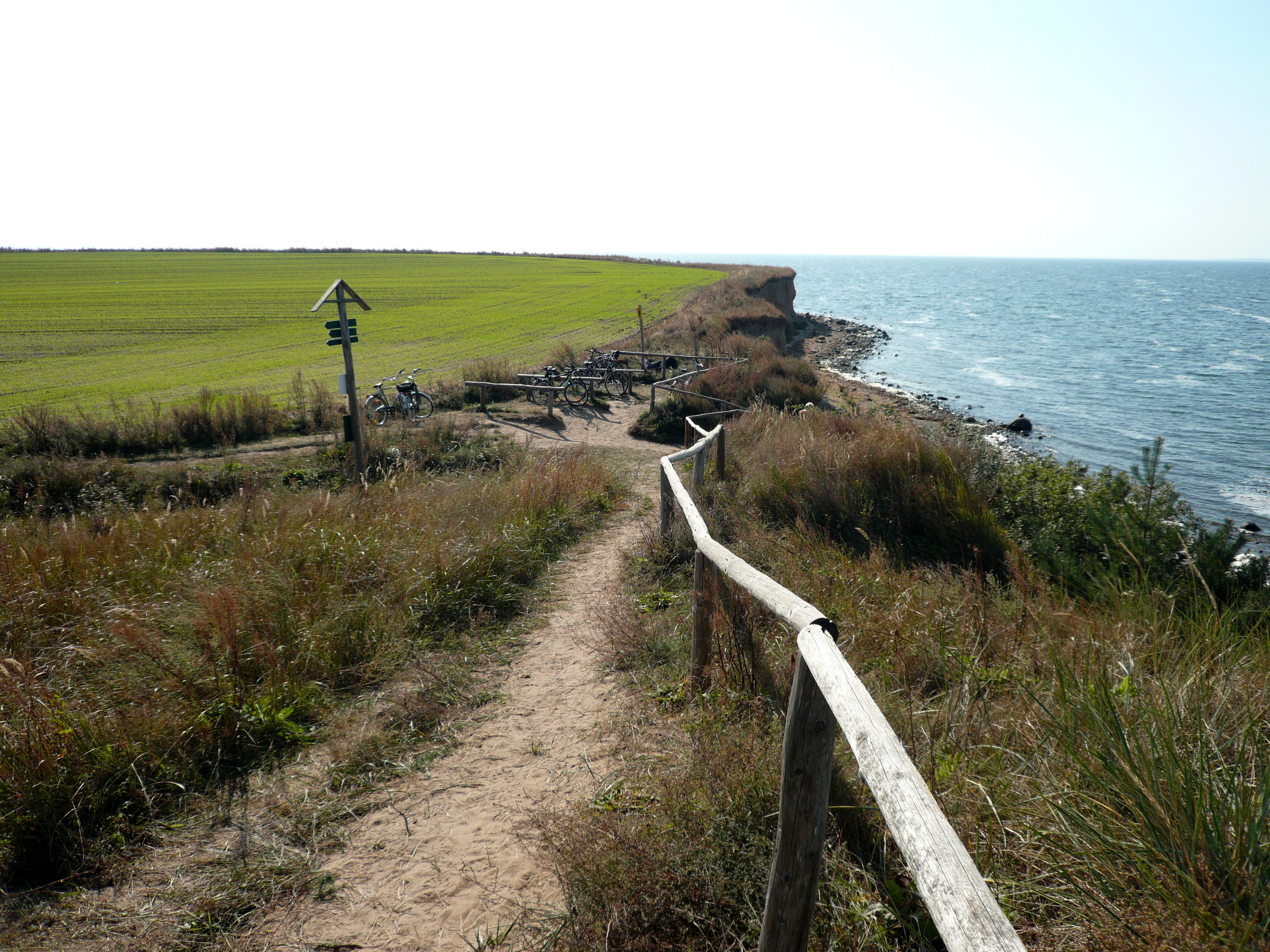
- Peninsula of Reddevitzer Hoeft at Middelhagen

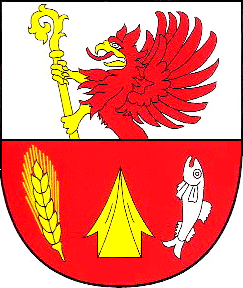
- Coat of arms
- Interactive map of Middelhagen
- Location within Germany Location within Mecklenburg-Vorpommern
- Coordinates: 54°20′N 13°42′E
- Country: Germany
- State: Mecklenburg-Vorpommern
- District: Vorpommern-Rügen
- Municipality: Mönchgut

Area
  - Total: 9.57 km^{2} (3.69 sq mi)
- Elevation: 5 m (16 ft)

Population (2015-12-31)
  - Total: 603
  - Density: 63.0/km^{2} (163/sq mi)
- Time zone: UTC+01:00 (CET)
  - Summer (DST): UTC+02:00 (CEST)
- Postal codes: 18586
- Dialling codes: 038308
- Vehicle registration: RÜG

Middelhagen (German pronunciation: [mɪdl̩ˈhaːɡn̩]) is a village and a former municipality in the Vorpommern-Rügen district, in Mecklenburg-Vorpommern, Germany. Since January 2018, it is part of the new municipality Mönchgut.
