= Selliner See (Rügen) =

Lake in Mecklenburg-Vorpommern, Germany

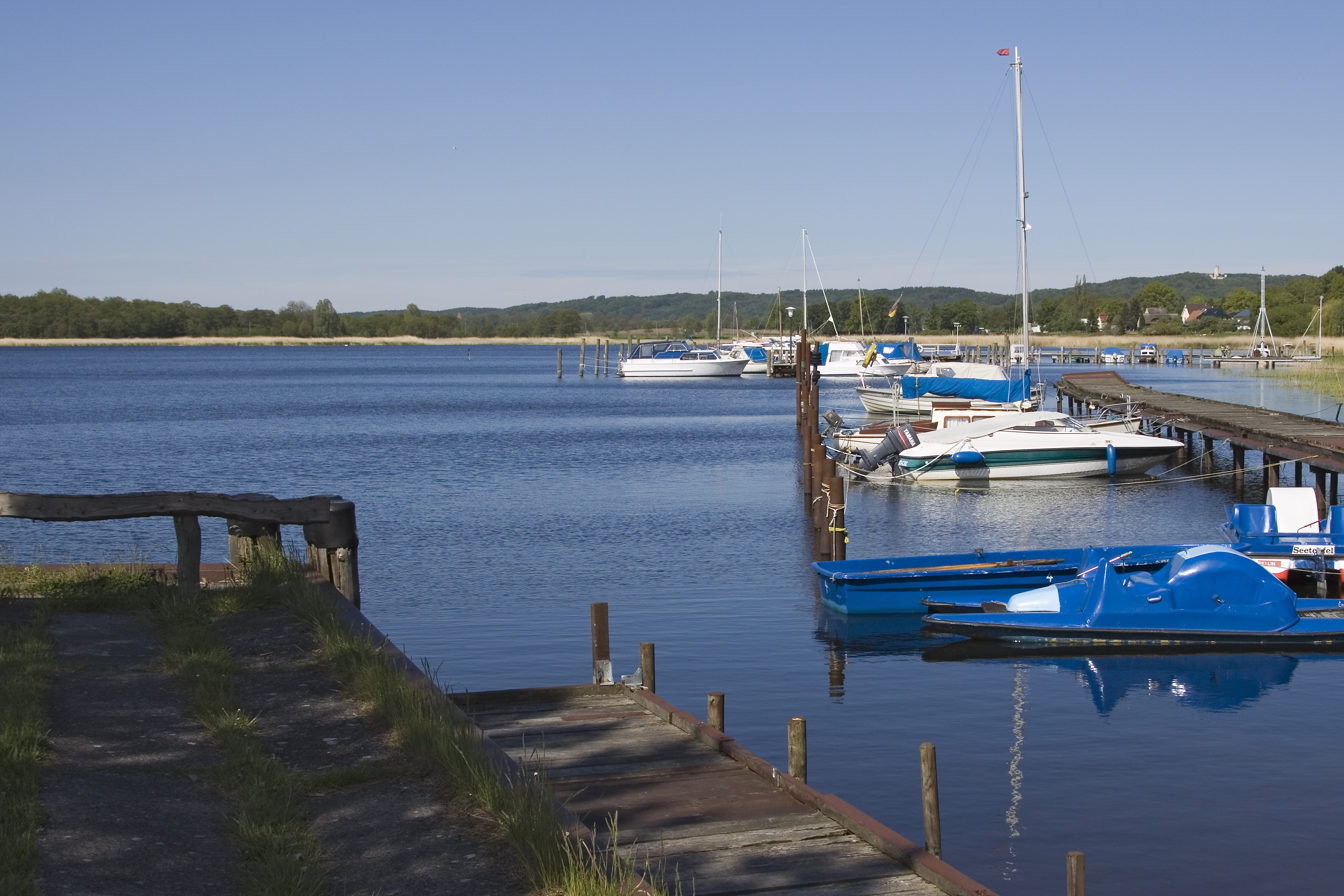
- Sellinersee Lake in Germany

- Location within Mecklenburg-Vorpommern
- Location: Vorpommern-Rügen, Mecklenburg-Vorpommern
- Coordinates: 54°21′56.01″N 13°41′11.62″E
- Primary outflows: Verbindung zum Having über die Baaber Bek
- Basin countries: Germany
- Max. length: 1.8 km (1.1 mi)
- Max. width: 0.85 km (0.53 mi)
- Surface area: 1.38 km^{2} (0.53 sq mi)
- Surface elevation: 0 m (0 ft)

Selliner See (Rügen) is a lake in the Vorpommern-Rügen district in Mecklenburg-Vorpommern, Germany. At an elevation of 0 m, its surface area is 1.38 square kilometres (0.53 sq mi)
