= Mönchgut =

Peninsula in Rügen, Germany

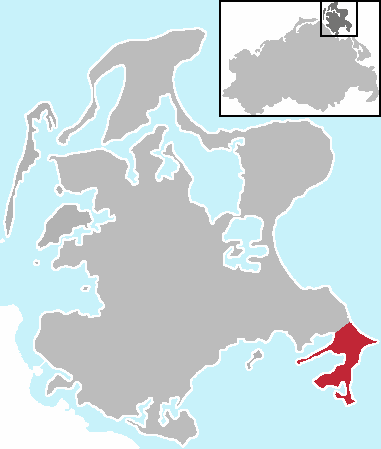
- Location of Mönchgut in Rügen

- Location within Germany Location within Mecklenburg-Vorpommern

Geography
- Location: Baltic Sea
- Coordinates: 54°21′N 13°43′E
- Area: 29.44 km^{2} (11.37 sq mi)

Administration
- Germany
- State: Mecklenburg-Vorpommern
- District: Vorpommern-Rügen

Mönchgut (German pronunciation: [ˈmœnçɡuːt], lit. 'Monk's Estates') is a peninsula of 20.66 square kilometers with 1,374 inhabitants in the southeast of Rügen island in Mecklenburg-Western Pomerania, Germany. It lies just between the Greifswalder Bodden and the rest of the Baltic Sea. Mönchgut contains the districts of Göhren and Thiessow; the peninsula is part of the Mönchgut-Granitz administration area. It is also a part of Southeast Rügen Biosphere Reserve.

The name translates as the monks' estates. In 1252, Jaromar II, Prince of Rügen sold the area to the Cistercian monks of Eldena Abbey, which was founded by one of his predecessors, Jaromar I, Prince of Rügen in 1199 and by that time also belonged to the Danish Principality of Rügen. To separate the monks' possessions from the rest of the island, a ditch was dug between Baabe and Sellin, known as Mönchsgraben ("monks' ditch"). Today, a large wooden gate built upon the bridge over the Mönchsgraben marks the entrance to the Mönchgut peninsula.

The peninsula is composed of several headlands such as Reddevitzer Höft, the Kleiner Zicker and the Großer Zicker. The bay between the headlands is called Having. Off-shore to the east of the peninsula lies the island Greifswalder Oie.

While the residents of the area earlier supported themselves through fishing and marine activities, today the area is primarily geared toward tourism. One main attraction is the local history museum in Göhren, an open-air museum located on historical settlements. Here there is also a display of the elaborate local costumes, which Mönchgut is well known for.

In 1806, Gustav IV Adolf of Sweden started to construct the town of Gustavia on the peninsula, but had to abandon the project when France occupied Mönchgut during the Napoleonic Wars.

Mönchgut also features the final station of the narrow-gauge railway the Rasender Roland.
