= Lobbe =

Lobbe is a surname. Notable people with the surname include:

- Ignacio Fernández Lobbe (born 20 November 1974), Argentine rugby union footballer
- Juan Martín Fernández Lobbe (born 19 November 1981), Argentine rugby union footballer
- Matthew Lobbe (born 12 February 1989), Australian-Rules Football player
