= Thiessow =

- Ortsteil of Mönchgut
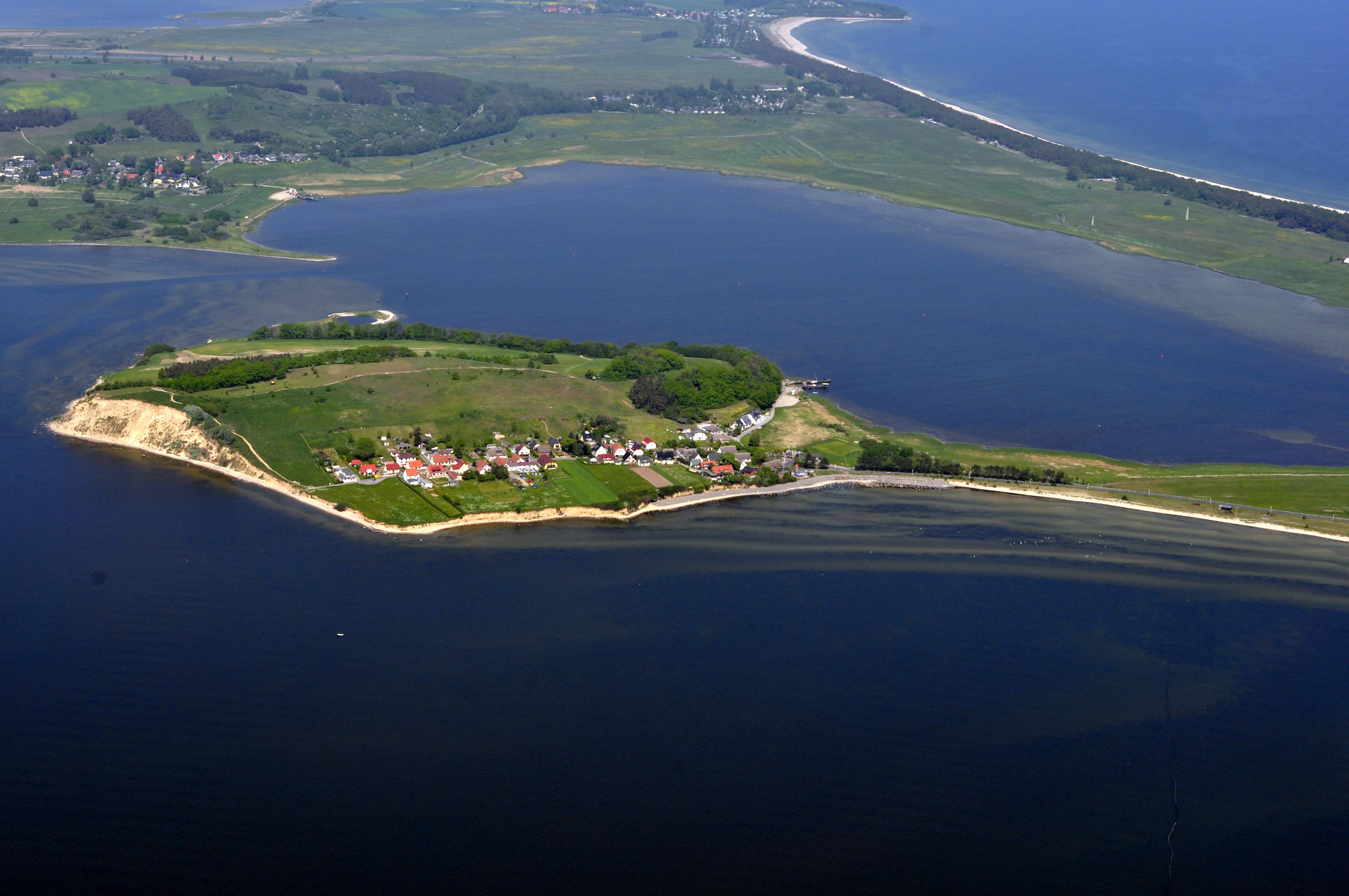
- Thiessow peninsula from above
- Interactive map of Thiessow
- Location within Germany Location within Mecklenburg-Vorpommern
- Coordinates: 54°16′N 13°43′E
- Country: Germany
- State: Mecklenburg-Vorpommern
- District: Vorpommern-Rügen
- Municipality: Mönchgut

Area
  - Total: 2.33 km^{2} (0.90 sq mi)
- Elevation: 3 m (9.8 ft)

Population (2015-12-31)
  - Total: 354
  - Density: 152/km^{2} (394/sq mi)
- Time zone: UTC+01:00 (CET)
  - Summer (DST): UTC+02:00 (CEST)
- Postal codes: 18586
- Dialling codes: 038308
- Vehicle registration: RÜG
- Website: http://www.thiessow.net/

Thiessow (German pronunciation: [ˈtiːsoː]) is a village and a former municipality in the Vorpommern-Rügen district, in Mecklenburg-Vorpommern, Germany. Since January 2018, it is part of the new municipality Mönchgut. Besides Thiessow, the municipality included the village Klein Zicker.

Thiessow is believed to have therapeutic waters for its thermal sources.
