= Baabe =

Place in Mecklenburg-Vorpommern, Germany

- Municipality
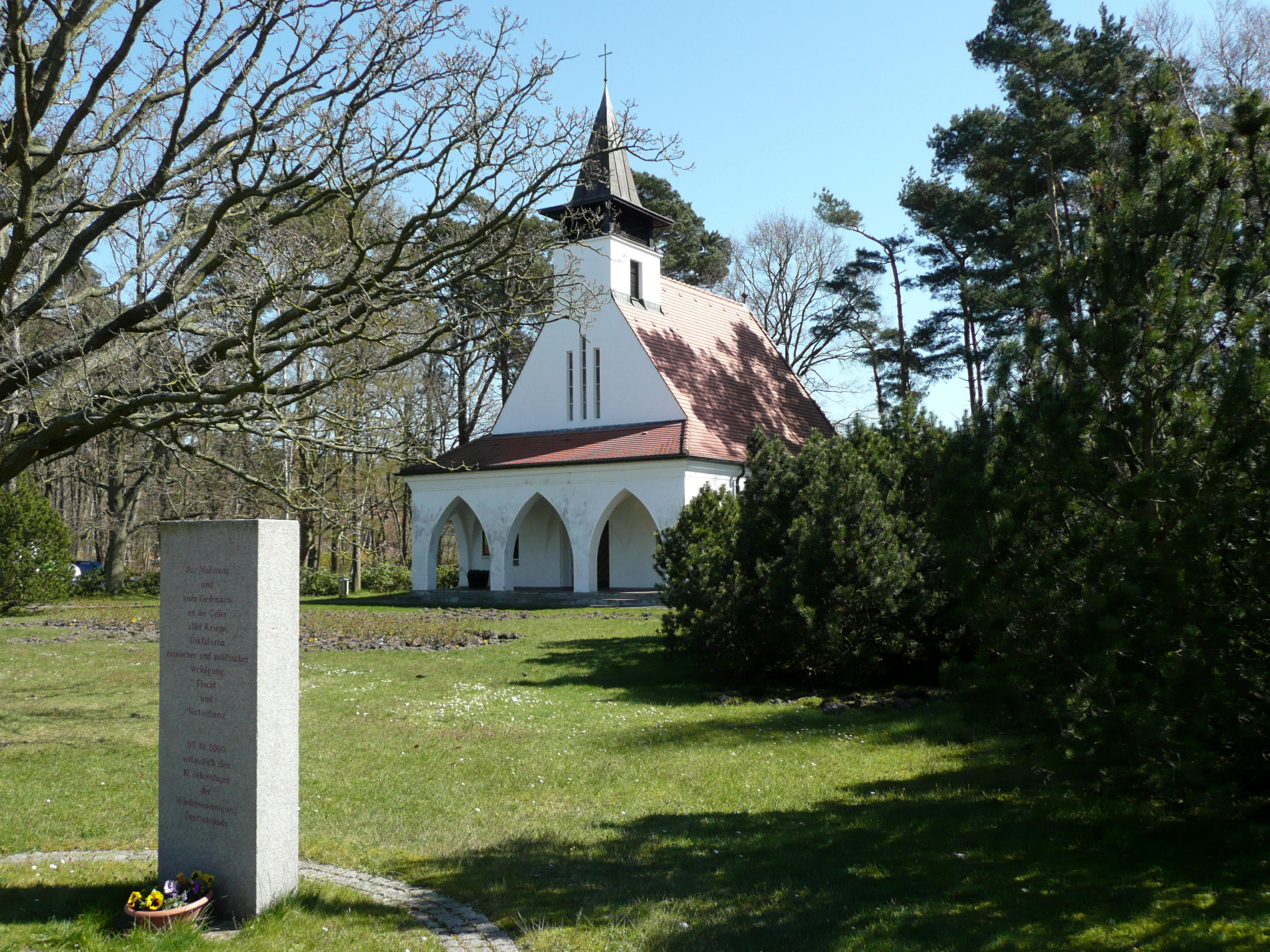
- The Evangelic Church (built 1929/30) in Baabe

- Coat of arms

- Location of Baabe within Vorpommern-Rügen district
- Interactive map of Baabe
- Location within Germany Location within Mecklenburg-Vorpommern
- Coordinates: 54°21′N 13°42′E
- Country: Germany
- State: Mecklenburg-Vorpommern
- District: Vorpommern-Rügen
- Municipal assoc.: Mönchgut-Granitz

Government
  - Mayor: Hartwig Diwisch (CDU)

Area
  - Total: 2.26 km^{2} (0.87 sq mi)
- Elevation: 10 m (33 ft)

Population (2025-12-31)
  - Total: 972
  - Density: 430/km^{2} (1,110/sq mi)
- Time zone: UTC+01:00 (CET)
  - Summer (DST): UTC+02:00 (CEST)
- Postal codes: 18586
- Dialling codes: 038303
- Vehicle registration: RÜG
- Website: www.baabe.de

Baabe is a municipality in the Vorpommern-Rügen district in Mecklenburg-Vorpommern, Germany.

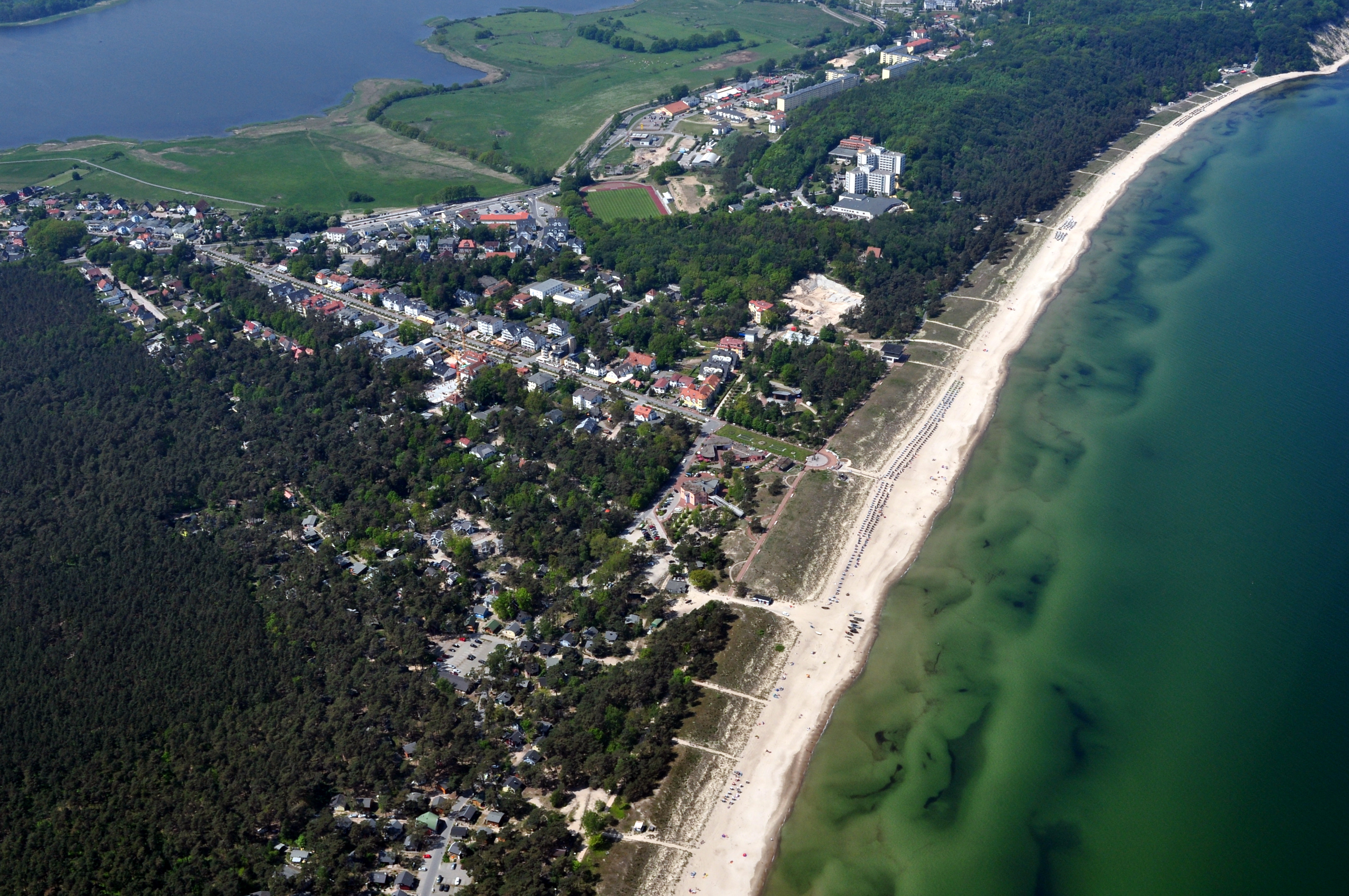
Aerial view of Baabe facing its sandy beaches of the Baltic Sea

== Sights ==
- Baaber Bollwerk viewing point
- Thatched houses
- Mönchgut Coastal Fishing Museum
- Baabe Village Church

At the northern exit from the village runs the Mönchgraben, the remnants of a medieval boundary ditch.

== Weather ==
In Baabe, the average temperature varies greatly. Considering humidity, the temperatures feel cool for half the year with some rain or snow. The warmest months to visit are June, July, and August with highs of 74.5 °F (23.6 °C) and lows of 58.5 °F (14.7 °C) at night.

The months with the lowest chance of significant rain or snow in Baabe are February, March, and April, with the best being March. It is more likely to rain or snow in early to mid January with an average of 2 days of significant precipitation a week.

== Tourism ==
The busiest tourism months for Baabe are May, followed by August and January.
