= Putbus =

Town in Mecklenburg-Vorpommern, Germany

- Town
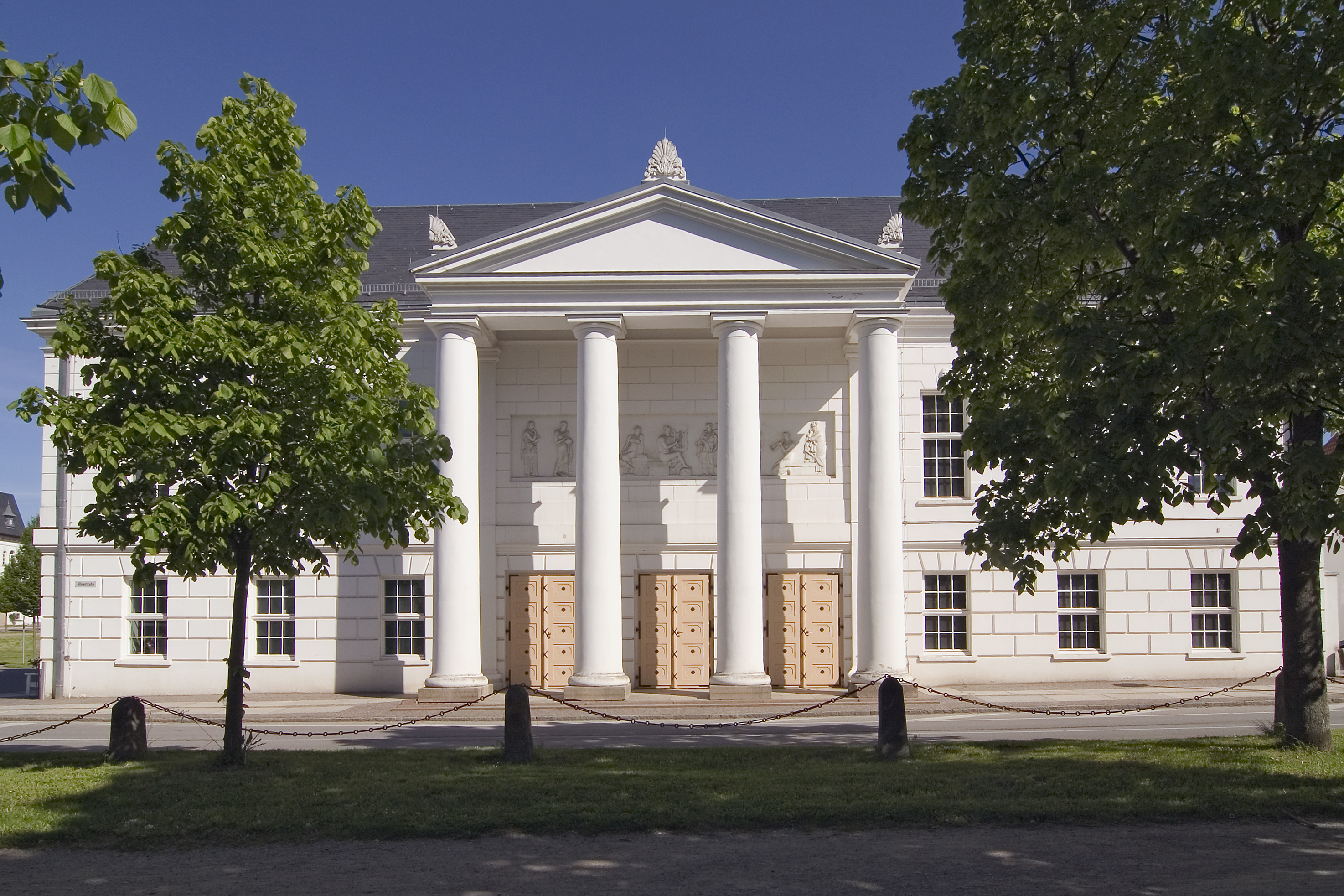
- Theatre

- Coat of arms

- Location of Putbus within Vorpommern-Rügen district
- Interactive map of Putbus
- Location within Germany Location within Mecklenburg-Vorpommern
- Coordinates: 54°21′16″N 13°28′30″E
- Country: Germany
- State: Mecklenburg-Vorpommern
- District: Vorpommern-Rügen

Government
  - Mayor: Harald Burwitz

Area
  - Total: 66.69 km^{2} (25.75 sq mi)
- Elevation: 50 m (160 ft)

Population (2025-12-31)
  - Total: 4,488
  - Density: 67.30/km^{2} (174.3/sq mi)
- Time zone: UTC+01:00 (CET)
  - Summer (DST): UTC+02:00 (CEST)
- Postal codes: 18581
- Dialling codes: 038301
- Vehicle registration: RÜG
- Website: www.putbus.de

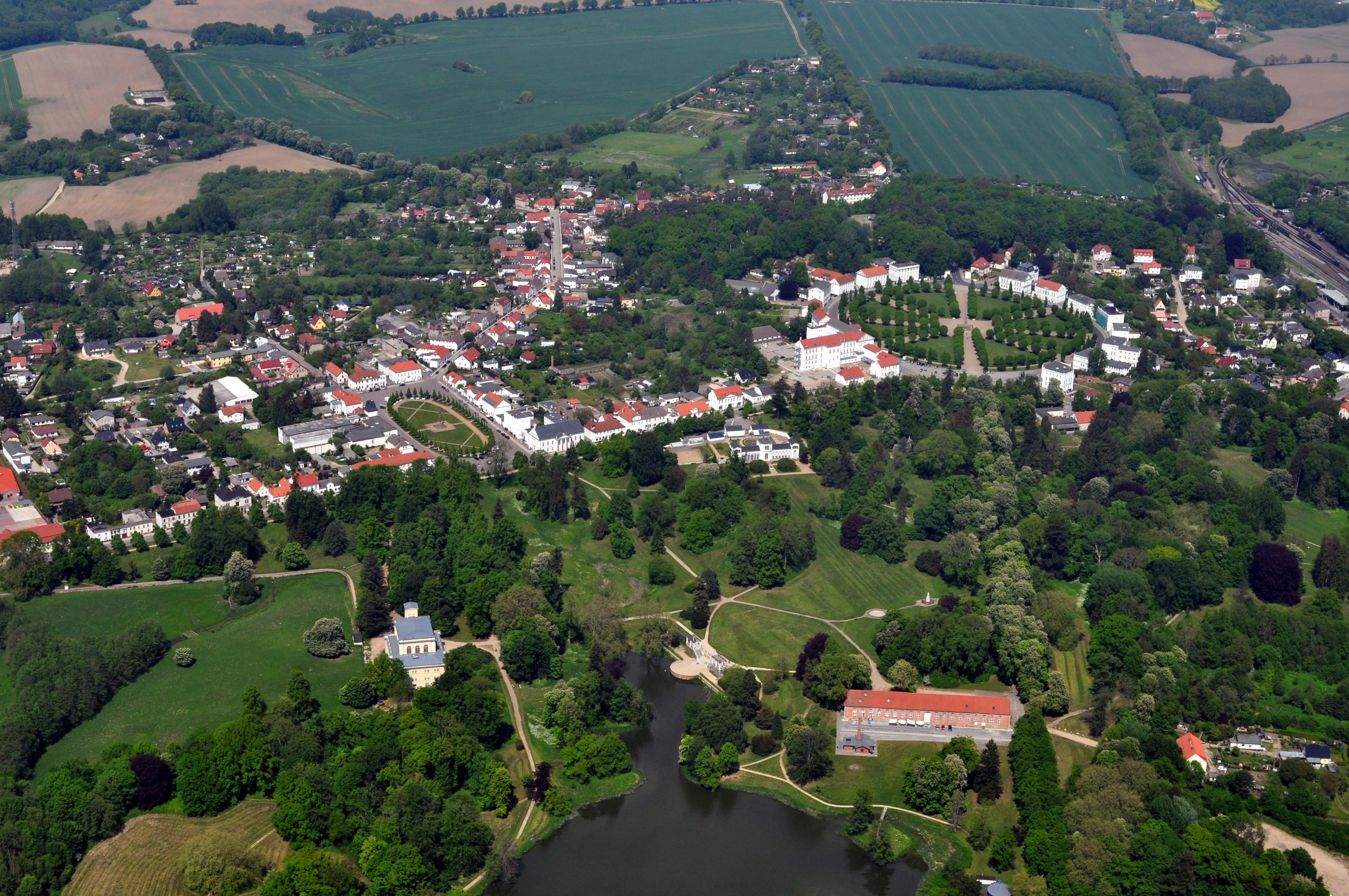
Aerial view - the town is a prominent example of a town that is built almost entirely in Neoclassical architecture.

Putbus (German: [ˈpʊtbʊs]) is a town on the southeastern coast of the island of Rügen, in the county of Vorpommern-Rügen in the state of Mecklenburg-Western Pomerania, close to the Baltic Sea. The town has 4,741 inhabitants and is a significant tourist destination with numerous seaside resorts. It is the oldest resort on the island and has been formally recognised by the state as a resort town since 1997.

Putbus was founded in 1810 by Prince Wilhelm Malte zu Putbus as his town of residence and had it built in the Classicist style, so that the town formed a harmonious union with the park and palace (Schloss). Malte also introduced sea bathing to Germany at Lauterbach which is about 2 km from Putbus. The nickname of the place as the "White Town" (Weiße Stadt) comes from its white-painted houses, but it is also referred to as Rosenstadt ("Rose Town") due to the many rose bushes in front of individual buildings.

== Etymology of the name ==
The name Putbus derives from the reconstructed *Podboz — from *pod ("under, behind" cf. Polish pod, Russian под) and *boz ("elder, elderberry bush" cf. Polish bez, Russian боз) — meaning "behind the elder bush." Early attested forms include Podebuz/Pedebuz (1250), Putzbuzk (c. 1280), de Putbuzke (1295), van Putbuzke (1318), and Putbuczk (1320). An alternative reconstruction, *Podbórz ("behind the forest/hill," from bór, "forest"), was proposed by Stanisław Kozierowski.

== Geography ==
The town of Putbus lies eight kilometres from Bergen auf Rügen and is located within the Southeast Rügen Biosphere Reserve. The terrain around Putbus is undulating and the coastline of the Rügischer Bodden, on which it lies, is characterized by an alternation of flat stretches of shore with steep banks. The cove of the Wreecher See makes a deep inroad into the coastline. The subdistrict of Lauterbach, with its approximately 500 inhabitants, has a fishing and sailing harbour. Near the forest of Goor, Prince Malte built the first seaside resort on the island. The island of Vilm in the Bay of Greifswald, 2.5 kilometres from Rügen, also belongs to Putbus.

=== Municipalities ===
The municipalities within the borough are: Altkamp, Alt-Lanschvitz, Beuchow, Darsband, Dolgemost, Dumgenevitz, Freetz, Glowitz, Gremmin, Groß-Stresow, Güstelitz, Kasnevitz, Klein-Stresow, Ketelshagen, Kransevitz, Krakvitz, Krimvitz, Lauterbach, Lonvitz, Muglitz, Nadelitz, Neuendorf, Neukamp, Neu-Lanschvitz, Pastitz, Posewald, Strachtitz, Vilmnitz, Wobbanz, Wreechen and the island of Vilm.

=== Neighbouring administrative units ===
Putbus is bordered in the west by the town borough of Garz/Rügen, in the north by Sehlen and the town of Bergen auf Rügen and in the east by Zirkow and Lancken-Granitz.

=== Land use ===
For a town, Putbus has an unusually high proportion of agricultural land and forest that covers 89% of the territory in the borough. The land use by type is detailed in the following table:

Actual land use type (as at 2008)	Area in ha	Percentage
Built-up areas and open spaces	265	4,0%
Factory and business land	5	0.1%
Transport routes	163	2.4%
Recreation areas	90	1.3%
Agricultural land	4,509	67.7%
Woods and forest	1,418	21.3%
Waterbodies	139	2.1%
Other areas	71	1.1%
Total area	6,660	100.0%

== History ==
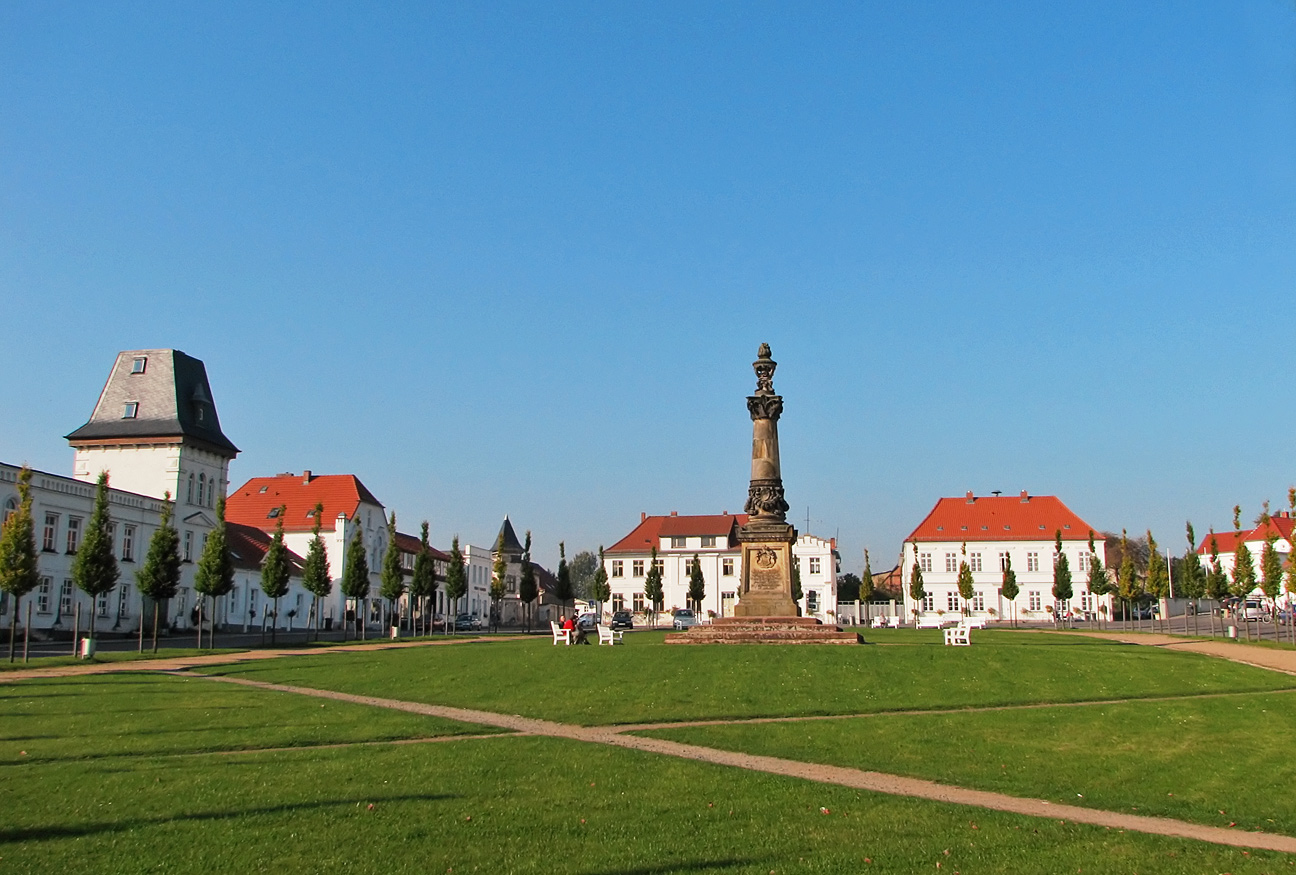
Neoclassical ensemble around the market square

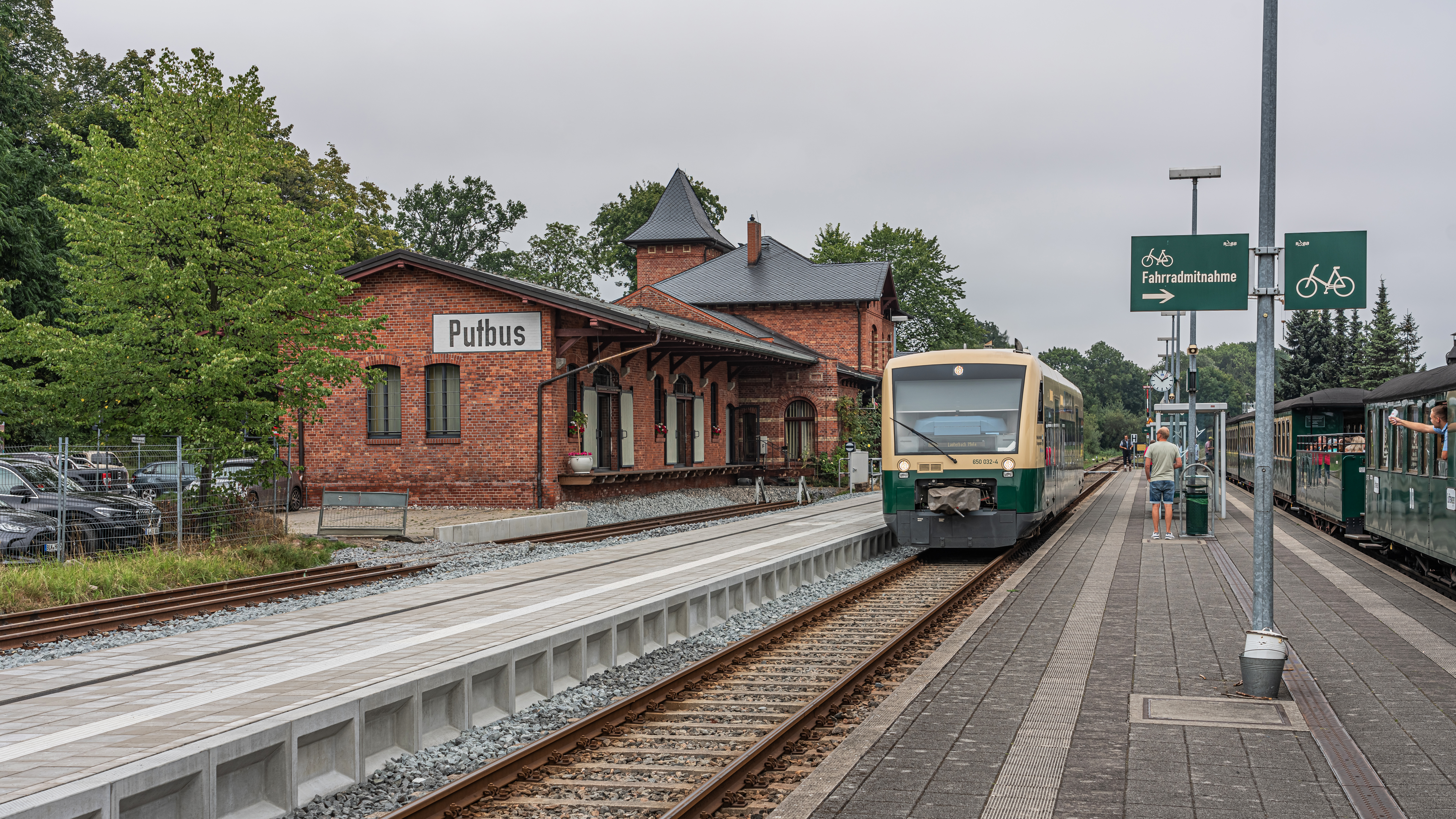
Putbus train station, served by the famous historical steam-powered railway that is nicknamed Rushing Roland

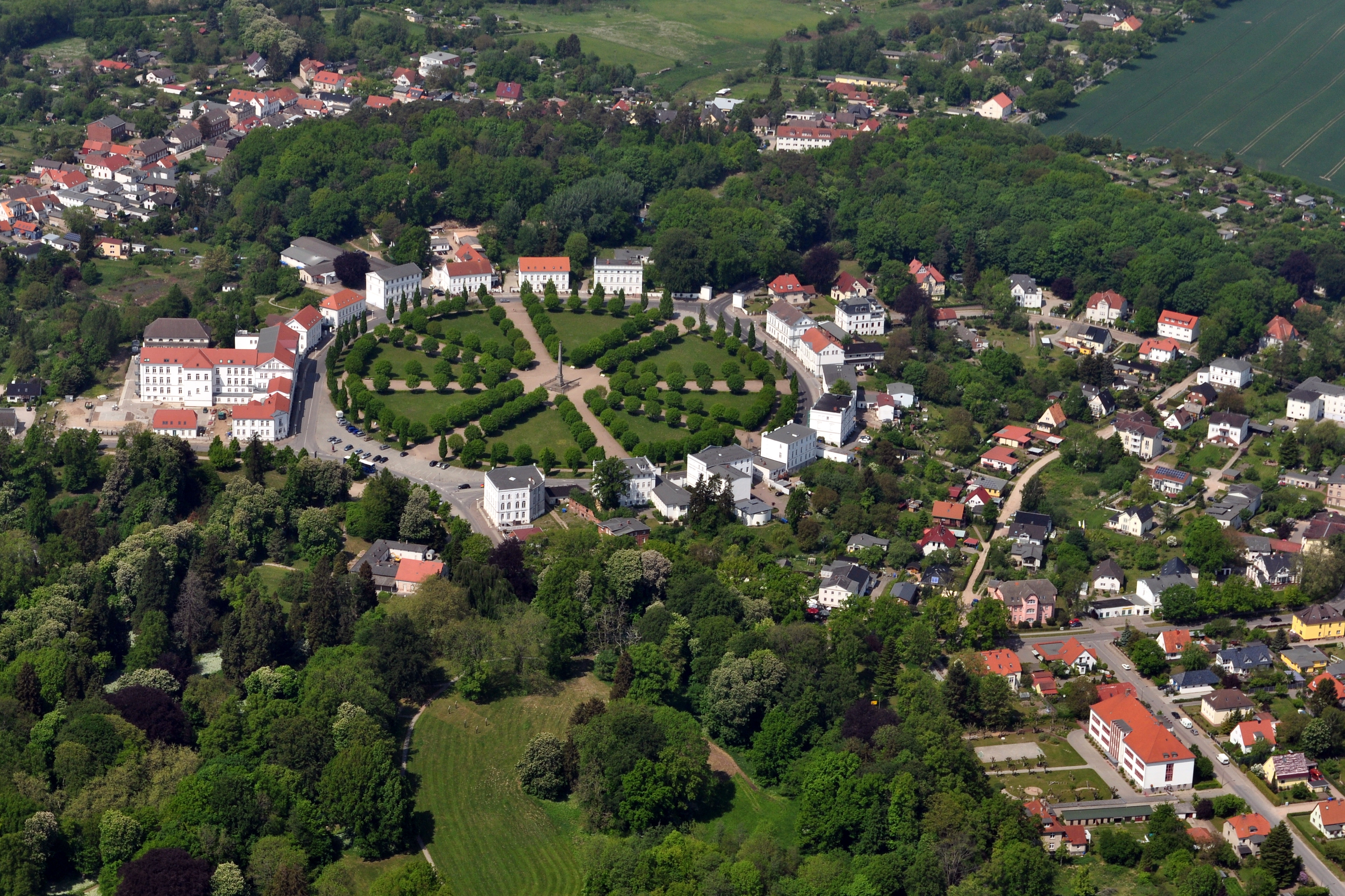
Aerial view of the famous early 19th-century neoclassical Putbus Circus in 2011

Until 1326, the area around Putbus was part of the Principality of Rügen. Mentioned for the first time in 1286 as Putbus, it was the seat of a noble family of Slavic origin. The lords of Putbus had the same status in terms of land ownership as the princes of Rügen and were regarded as a collateral line. Later a feudal dependency arose. Following the extinction of the Rügen princes in the 14th century, Putbus went into the Duchy of Pomerania. Under the Treaty of Westphalia in 1648, Rügen came under Swedish rule. In 1815 the place and New Western Pomerania went into the Prussian province of Pomerania.

From 1808 to 1823, Prince Malte of Putbus built his residence and a bathing area in Lauterbach along the lines of Bad Doberan. As a result, in 1816, the first seaside resort on Rügen was opened. In 1817/18 Prince Malte had the Goor Swimming Baths built. From 1819 to 1821, the residence theatre was built and modified in 1826. The royal stables, built from 1821–1824, were home to Prince Malte's horses. Finally, from 1824 to 1853, he built the orangery. The conversion of the palace began in 1825, and it was joined in 1844–1846 by the Putbus Palace Church. The transformation of the castle park began in 1804; the monkey house was completed in 1830 and the pheasant house five years later.

The first civic house was built in 1810 as a small brewery. The residential houses on the Circus were built between 1815 and 1860. In 1836 the old royal Pädagogium was opened as an educational establishment. Today it houses the Putbus IT College (IT-College Putbus).

In 1889 Putbus was given a railway link from Bergen. In 1895 the first section of the narrow gauge light railway, Rasender Roland, to Binz was completed.

In 1823 Putbus was given town rights for trade and business; it was not granted full rights however until 2 July 1960.

In 1962 the former Putbus Palace (Schloss Putbus) was destroyed by the East German communist régime, which considered it a symbol of Prussian imperialism. However, its orangery and stables survive in the park.

In 1818 Putbus became part of the county of Vorpommern-Rügen (for a time known as Kreis Rügen). From 1952 to 1955 the county was divided and Putbus was the centre of the county of Putbus. From 1952 to 1990 Putbus belonged to the district (Bezirk) of Rostock and, after that, to the state of Mecklenburg-Vorpommern.

After the political Wende in 1991 the historic town centre with its Circus, market place (Marktplatz) and town hall, orangery and royal stables, now a theatre, were thoroughly renovated as part of the urban development and heritage conservation projects in the town. Today, Putbus presents an unusual, uniform white appearance.

In 2010, the Upside-Down House (Haus-Kopf-über) was erected on the road to Lauterbach as a tourist attraction.

The town is also notable for the small theatre and the Crown Prince's residence (now a tourist office and museum). The town is connected to the rest of Rügen by the narrow gauge steam railway known as Rasender Roland and by good roads and cycle tracks.

== Climate ==
Putbus has an oceanic climate (Köppen: Cfb; Trewartha: Dolk). Putbus is located at the southeastern tip of the island of Rügen, close to the Baltic Sea coast, and has a distinct maritime nature relative to the German inland, the average temperature in all months is above 1 °C (34 °F), and the summer is much cooler than inland areas.

The Putbus weather station has recorded the following extreme values:

- Its highest temperature was 35.8 °C (96.4 °F) on 30 June 2019.
- Its lowest temperature was −23.6 °C (−10.5 °F) on 19 January 1893.
- Its greatest annual precipitation was 888.9 mm (35.00 in) in 2007.
- Its least annual precipitation was 356.9 mm (14.05 in) in 1871.
- The longest annual sunshine was 2127.9 hours in 2022.
- The shortest annual sunshine was 1461.2 hours in 2004.

Climate data for Putbus (1991–2020 normals, extremes 1853–present)
Month	Jan	Feb	Mar	Apr	May	Jun	Jul	Aug	Sep	Oct	Nov	Dec	Year
Record high °C (°F)	14.4 (57.9)	17.5 (63.5)	21.4 (70.5)	27.2 (81.0)	33.0 (91.4)	35.8 (96.4)	34.7 (94.5)	34.0 (93.2)	31.0 (87.8)	25.3 (77.5)	19.8 (67.6)	14.0 (57.2)	35.8 (96.4)
Mean maximum °C (°F)	8.4 (47.1)	8.9 (48.0)	14.6 (58.3)	19.9 (67.8)	24.3 (75.7)	27.6 (81.7)	28.9 (84.0)	29.0 (84.2)	24.2 (75.6)	18.4 (65.1)	13.1 (55.6)	9.6 (49.3)	30.7 (87.3)
Mean daily maximum °C (°F)	2.7 (36.9)	3.4 (38.1)	6.8 (44.2)	11.8 (53.2)	16.5 (61.7)	19.8 (67.6)	22.1 (71.8)	22.3 (72.1)	18.4 (65.1)	12.6 (54.7)	7.8 (46.0)	4.2 (39.6)	12.5 (54.5)
Daily mean °C (°F)	1.7 (35.1)	1.9 (35.4)	4.6 (40.3)	8.6 (47.5)	12.5 (54.5)	15.6 (60.1)	17.8 (64.0)	17.1 (62.8)	13.7 (56.7)	9.8 (49.6)	5.4 (41.7)	2.8 (37.0)	9.4 (48.9)
Mean daily minimum °C (°F)	−1.5 (29.3)	−1.1 (30.0)	0.7 (33.3)	3.8 (38.8)	7.4 (45.3)	10.9 (51.6)	13.3 (55.9)	13.7 (56.7)	11.0 (51.8)	7.0 (44.6)	3.7 (38.7)	0.4 (32.7)	5.8 (42.4)
Mean minimum °C (°F)	−8.4 (16.9)	−7.3 (18.9)	−4.8 (23.4)	−1.3 (29.7)	1.9 (35.4)	6.8 (44.2)	9.4 (48.9)	9.5 (49.1)	6.4 (43.5)	1.1 (34.0)	−2.2 (28.0)	−6.4 (20.5)	−10.9 (12.4)
Record low °C (°F)	−23.6 (−10.5)	−23.4 (−10.1)	−16.1 (3.0)	−7.3 (18.9)	−3.1 (26.4)	0.9 (33.6)	1.0 (33.8)	1.0 (33.8)	0.0 (32.0)	−3.6 (25.5)	−11.0 (12.2)	−20.0 (−4.0)	−23.6 (−10.5)
Average precipitation mm (inches)	56.1 (2.21)	40.3 (1.59)	41.5 (1.63)	33.2 (1.31)	46.9 (1.85)	67.5 (2.66)	73.7 (2.90)	71.0 (2.80)	53.2 (2.09)	60.7 (2.39)	57.0 (2.24)	61.4 (2.42)	677.6 (26.68)
Average extreme snow depth cm (inches)	7.8 (3.1)	11.1 (4.4)	5.4 (2.1)	2.7 (1.1)	0 (0)	0 (0)	0 (0)	0 (0)	0 (0)	0 (0)	0.2 (0.1)	6.5 (2.6)	15.1 (5.9)
Average precipitation days (≥ 1.0 mm)	19.5	15.8	14.2	11.3	12.1	13.5	14.6	15.1	12.9	16.5	17.6	19.6	184.2
Average relative humidity (%)	87.3	85.4	81.6	76.8	76.0	76.9	76.9	76.7	79.4	84.2	88.2	88.8	81.5
Mean monthly sunshine hours	43.3	64.7	132.6	220.6	264.0	260.7	258.7	226.5	170.5	108.7	53.4	31.8	1,828.7
Source 1: World Meteorological Organization
Source 2: Deutscher Wetterdienst / SKlima.de

== Politics ==
=== Town council ===
The Putbus town council has 17 councillors. The seats were divided after the last local elections as follows:

Party	Percentage of votes	Number of seats
Christian Democrats (CDU)	31.08%	5
The Left	13.37%	2
Free Democrats (FDP)	11.80%	2
Socialist Party (SPD)	10,97%	2
Zukunft für Putbus Voters' Association (Wählergemeinschaft)	7.52%	1
Pro Putbus Voters' Association	7.44%	1
Bündnis für Rügen (BfR) Voters' Association	6.32%	1
Unser Wissen für Putbus (UwfP) Voters' Association	6.12%	1
Alliance '90/The Greens	3.23%	1
Putbus Voters' Association (PWG)	2.15%	1

=== Mayor ===
Harald Burwitz (FDP) was chosen as Mayor of Putbus. The mayoral time in office is 7 years and ends in 2015. The town council have elected Monika Scherff and Thomas Möller as deputies.

=== Coat of arms ===
The coat of arms of Putbus was authorised on 9 December 1938 by the governor of Stettin and registered as No. 195 in the coat of arms roll of Mecklenburg-Vorpommern.

=== Flag ===
The flag of the town of Putbus has two longitudinal black and gold (yellow) stripes. In the centre of the flag is the town coat of arms, two thirds of the height of the two stripes. The ratio of the flag is 5:3.

=== Twinning ===
Putbus has been twinned with the towns of Eutin in Germany (since 3 October 1990) and Rewal in Poland (since 23 May 2002).

== Culture and sights ==
=== Sights ===
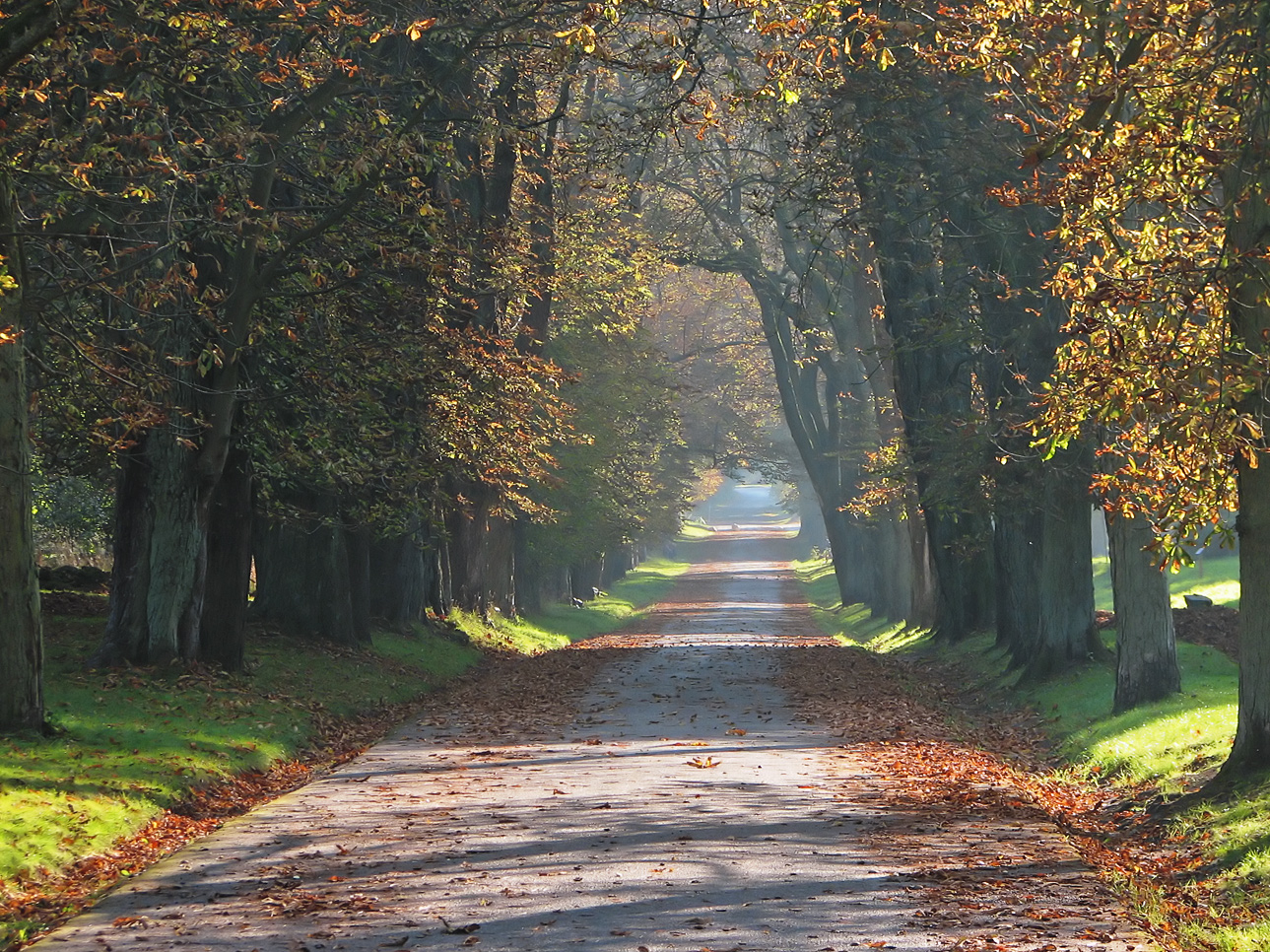
Horse-chestnut avenue in the town park of Putbus

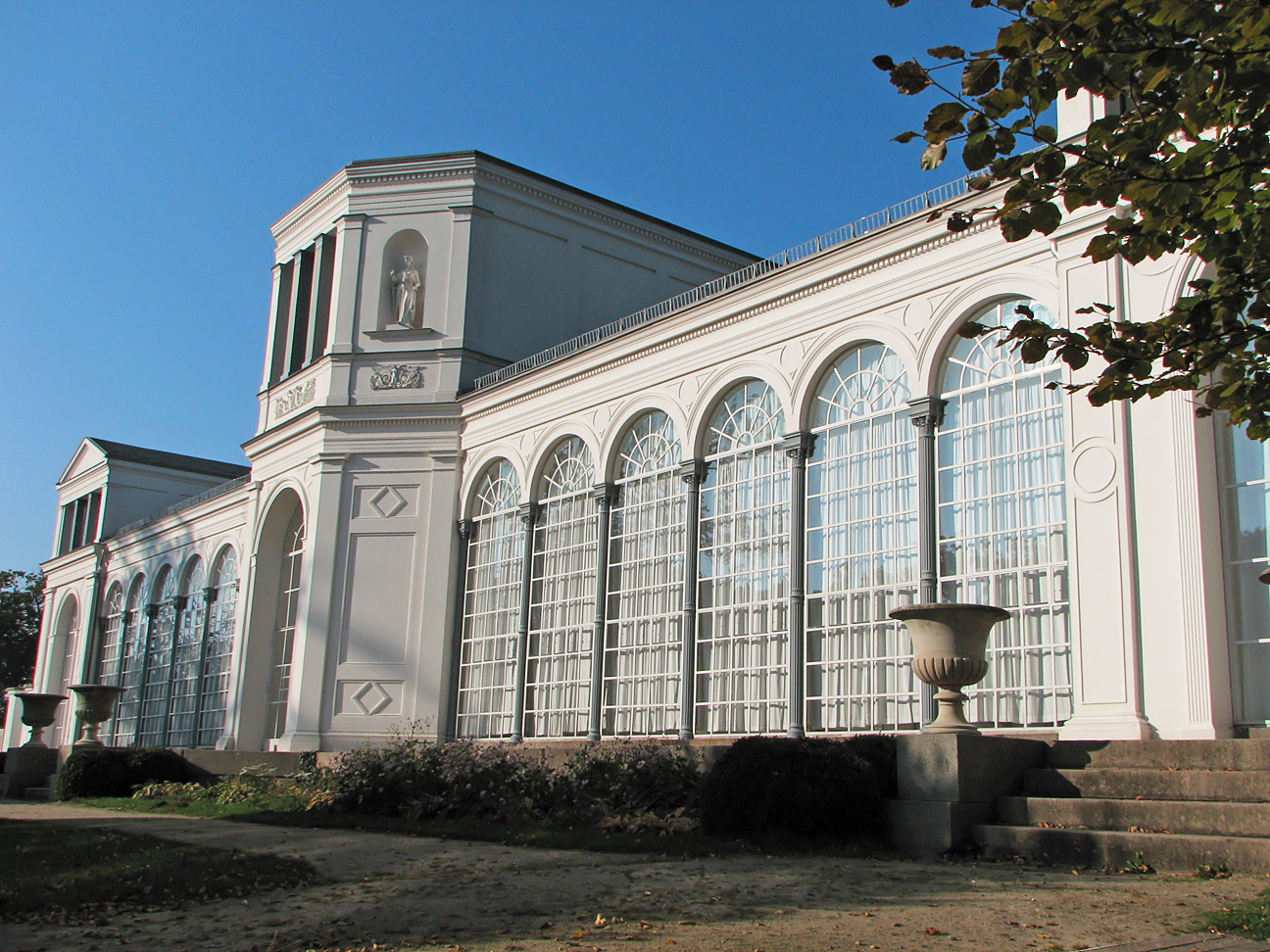
Putbus Orangery

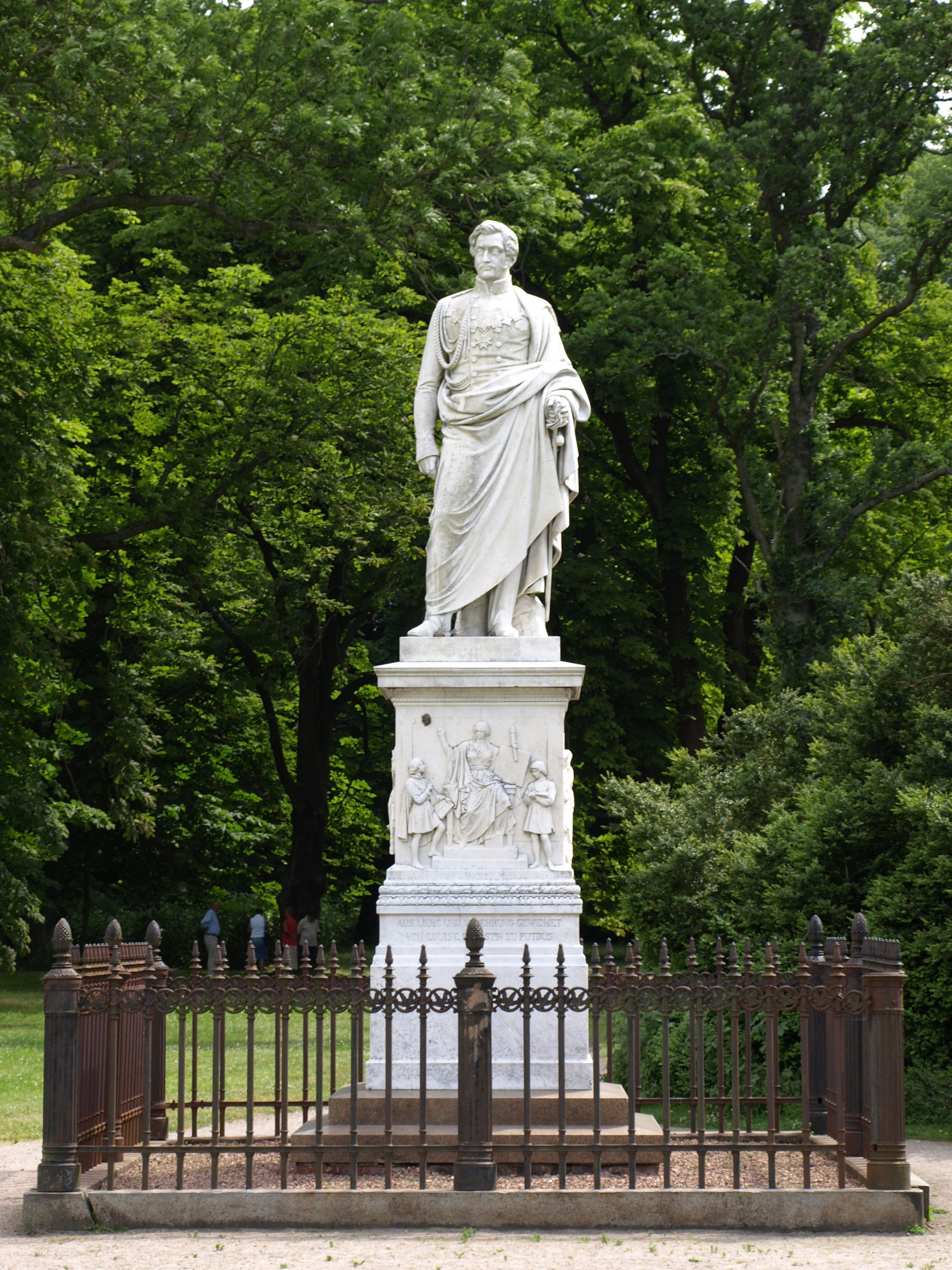
Statue of its founder, Prince Wilhelm Malte I

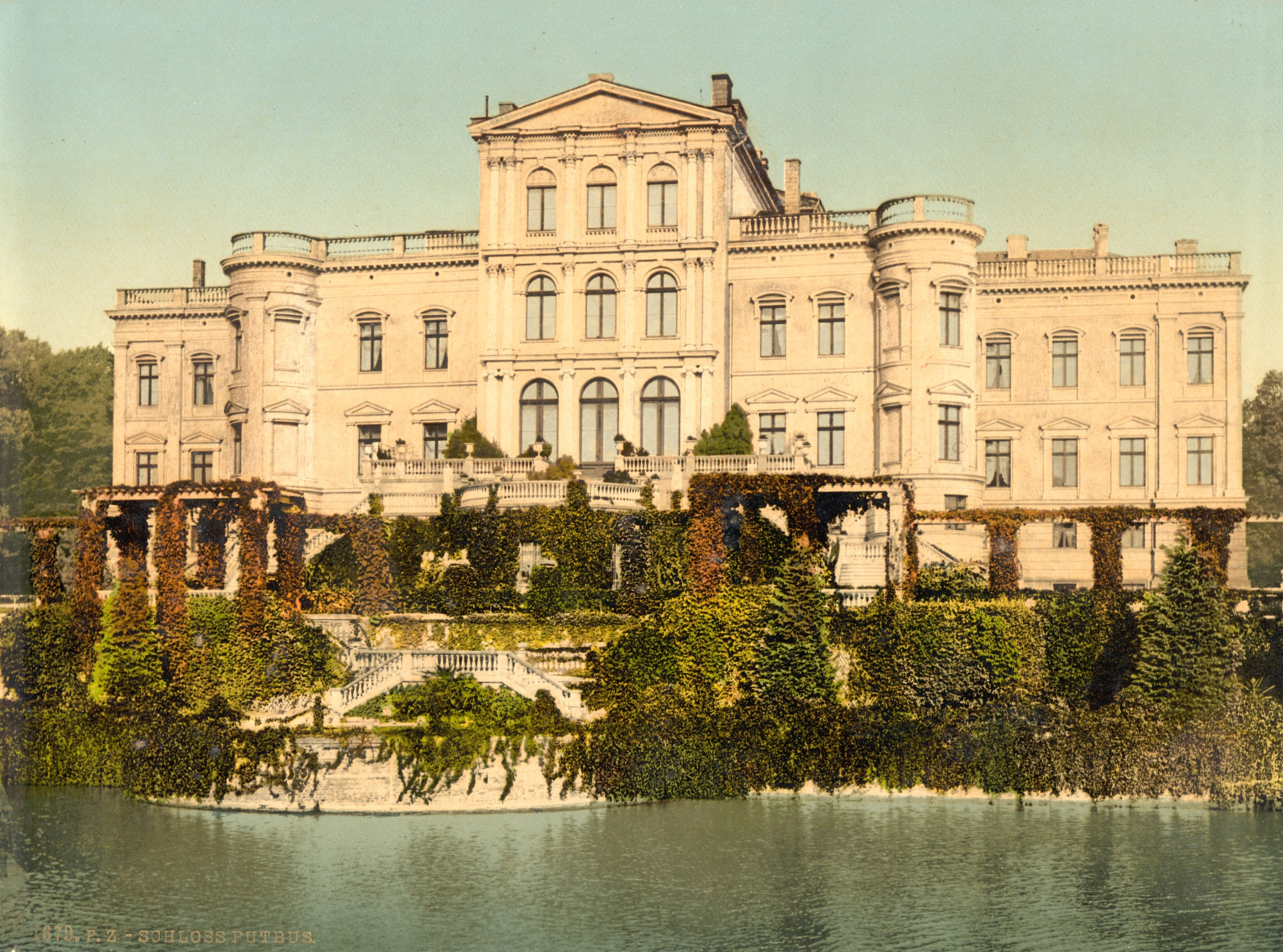
Former Putbus Palace around 1900

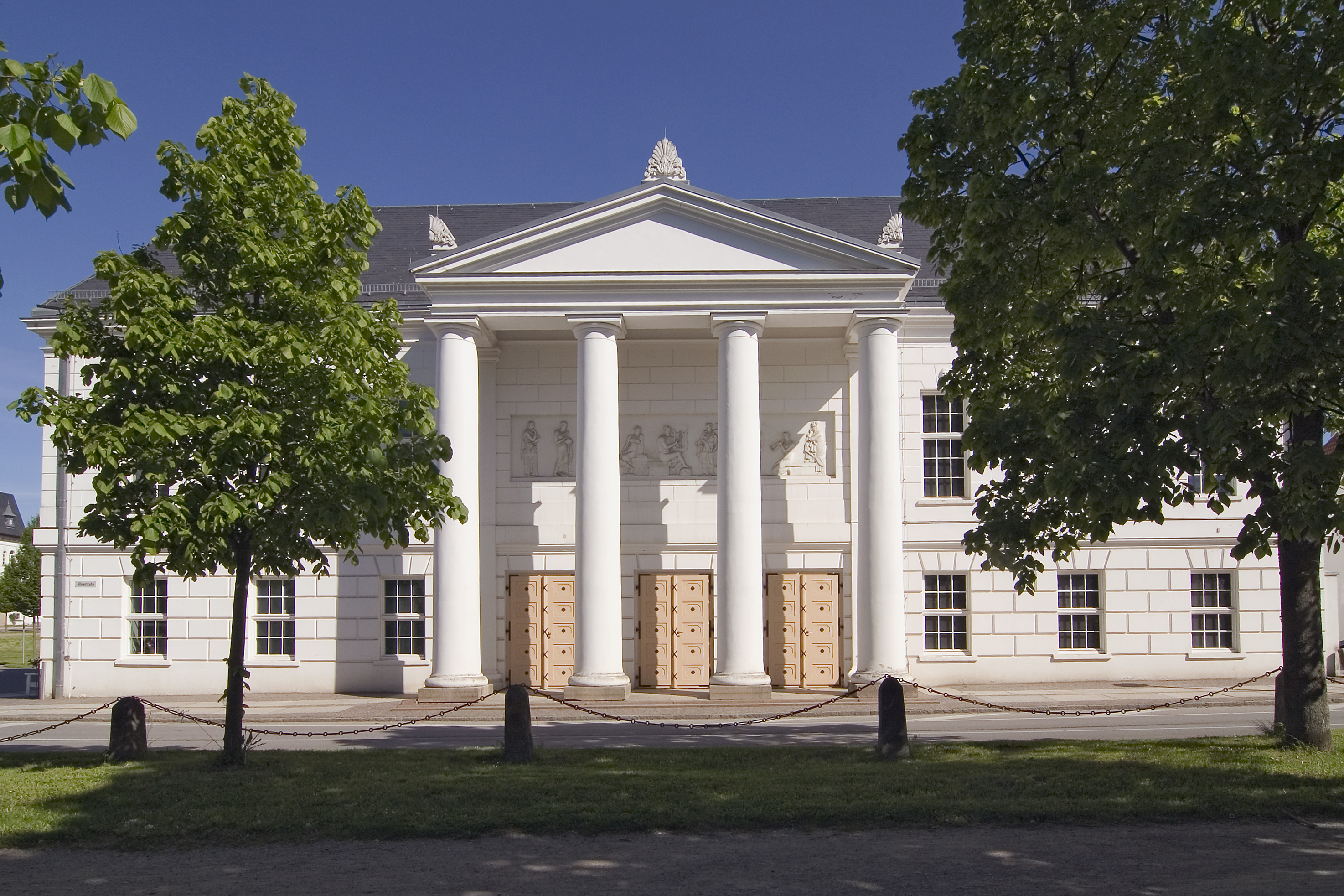
Neoclassical Putbus Theatre

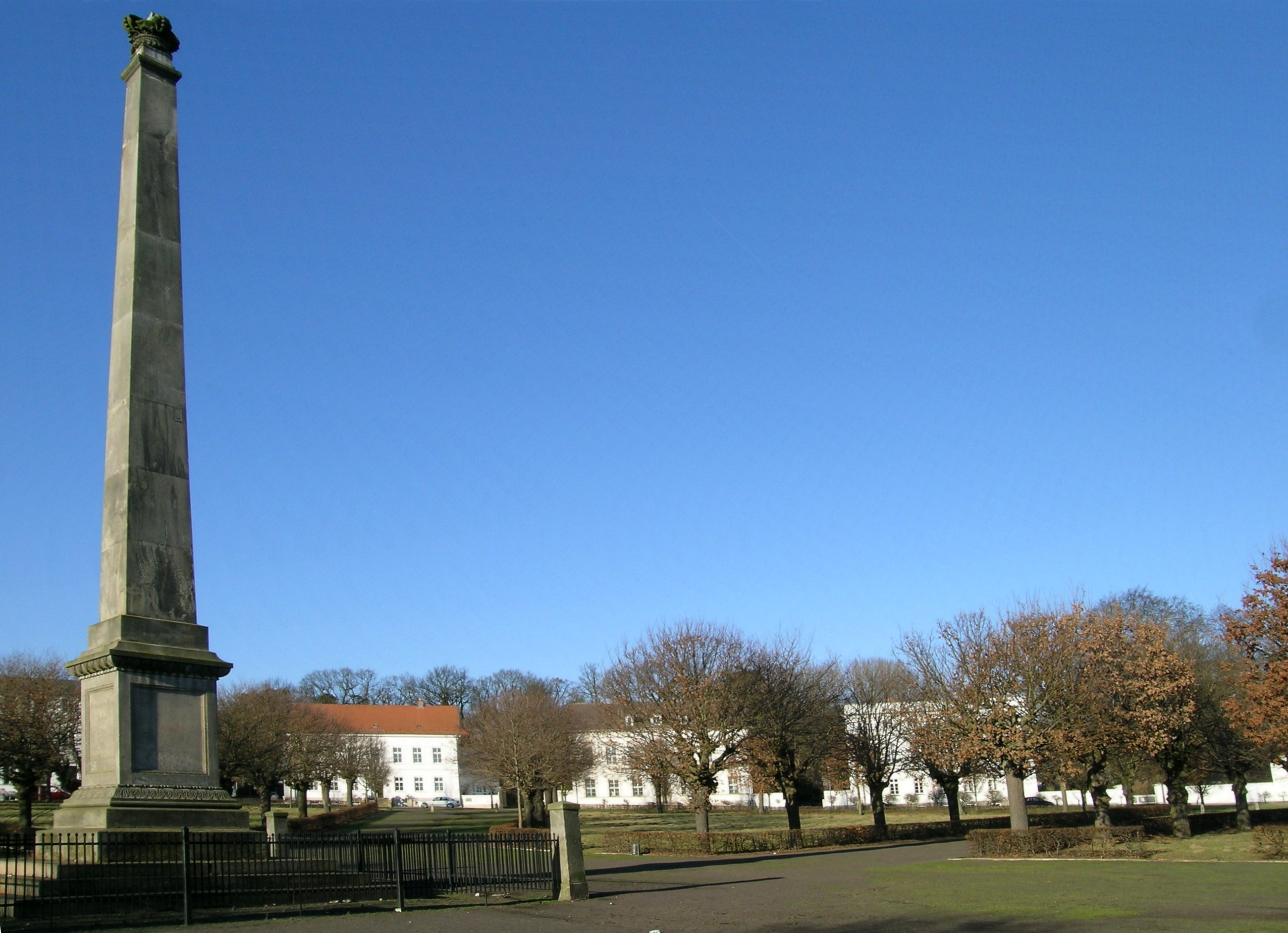
Houses on the roundabout and square with the obelisk in the foreground

==== Palace park ====
The palace park (Schlosspark) was laid out in 1804 by Wilhelm Malte I. in the style of a French garden. Later it was transformed into an English landscape park. It has numerous impressive views of the lagoon or bodden countryside. Structures that survived the East German era are the orangery of 1824, the royal stables built from 1821 to 1824, the mausoleum of 1867, the palace church built from 1844 to 1846, the parish church, the monkey house and aviary from 1830/35. Putbus Palace, which was once surrounded by the park, was demolished in the 1960s. The park also has other unusual dendrological specimens such as giant and ancient sequoias, cedars, yellow-blossomed horse chestnuts and tulip poplars. Attached to the Schlosspark is a wildlife enclosure for Red and Fallow Deer.

==== Orangery ====
In the 18th century a pleasure garden along French lines was created at the initiative of Count Moritz Ulrich I of Putbus. The Orangery or greenhouse was built in 1824 in place of the belvedere, cancelled in 1804/05, and an ice house (1816–1819), based on plans by Karl Friedrich Schinkel. The present Orangery dates to the year 1853 and was remodeled by Berlin architect, August Stüler. Until 1945, the Orangery was mainly used to acclimatize non-native shrubs intended for the park and to enable pot plants arranged around the palace during the summer to survive the winter. In addition the building was used for festive events. After 1945 some of the rooms were made available as accommodation for displaced families. In 1973 the town library and resort administration were housed in the Orangery. Exhibition activity began in one of the galleries. At the beginning of 1996 the main building was largely rebuilt in just 16 weeks and, on 24 May 1996, it was handed over to become the artistic exhibition centre for the island of Rügen.

==== Royal stables ====
The royal stables were used to keep horses and to store harnesses and coaches for the prince's family and their guests, as well as providing lodgings for the stablehands. The grounds of the royal stables in Putbus's palace park also include the riding area and the old smithy. In 1817 the first performance of theatrical pieces for guests took place in a carriage house belonging to the old stables. Following its demolition, the construction of the new stables was carried out from 1821 to 1824 in a Classicist style with 16 arched windows and three arched portals, probably to plans by Berlin architect, Johann Gottfried Steinmeyer. The eastern gable of the building is decorated by a tondo with an equestrian relief.

==== Palace church ====
The Church of Christ is a 19th-century, triple-aisled church situated in the palace park at Putbus.

==== Mausoleum ====
Originally the church of St. Mary Magdalene in Vilmnitz served as the family tomb of the von Putbus family. Not until 1867 was the present mausoleum built in the grounds of the palace park in a neo-Gothic style. The first member of the family to be buried here was Wanda von Putbus, wife of Prince Wilhelm Malte II of Putbus (1833–1907), in 1868.

==== Former Putbus Palace ====
Putbus Palace in the palace park was the former aristocratic residence of the princes of Putbus. The building was torn down between 1960 and 1964. The original site of the palace is indicated today by means of a few metal posts, that make clear the ground plan of the building in the current field.

==== Residence theatre ====
The old residence theatre, built in the Classicist style, stands opposite the park. It was probably built from 1819 to 1821 under the direction of the prince's master architect, W. Steinbach. In 1826 a remodelling was carried out under Schinkel's pupil, Johann Gottlieb Steinmeyer, in which gables were added above the ends of the building and over the portico. It was painstakingly restored from 1992 to 1998 and is one of the most dominant buildings in the town. Historically, the theatre was generally only used as a summer theatre. Putbus only had its own theatre company from 1952 to 1968. Today only visiting companies put on performances in the theatre with its 244 seats. Each year in May the Putbus Festival attracts visitors from all over Germany to Putbus.

==== Circus ====
Classicist buildings ring this circular roundabout, known as the Circus, on which all the local roads converge. A clearly divided area of parkland fills the inner ring of the square, whose centre point is marked by a tall obelisk. The Putbus Circus is the last uniformly designed circus in Germany, which Prince Wilhelm Malte I of Putbus laid out from 1828, at the same time as founding the Pedagogium, based on the "Circus" in the English bathing resort of Bath (Roman: Aquae Sulis), and French gardens. In 1845 he had it developed in the period to 1845 with neo-classical houses. All the buildings that were erected in the time of Prince Malte I are still there, only their use has changed. For example, the Royal Putbus Pedagogium, which was built in 1833-1836 by Prince Wilhelm Malte I of Putbus to plans by Johann Gottfried Steinmeyer. This building now houses the "Putbus IT College". On the other hand, we have the boarding school wing (Nebenalumnat) of the Pedagogium, which was built in 1835 by the mariner, Wilcken. This building is now the home of the "IT Science Centre."

==== Former Putbus Pedagogium ====
The largest house on the Circus is the former Putbus Pedagogium. It was Prince Malte of Putbus, who wanted his aristocratic seat to have a higher educational institution with the aim of educating and raising the children of his territory. He had the house built at No. 16, Circus, in 1833. The Princely Pädagogium of Putbus was built with a boarding school, canteen and gymnasium. In 1836, he handed it over to the Prussian state as the Pädagogium Regium (Royal Pedagogium). Until the Second World War, the Pedagogium was the most important educational institution in Western Pomerania after the University of Greifswald. From 1941 to 1945 the National Political Institutes of Education of Rügen was housed in this building. After the Second World War, teachers were trained here from 1946 to 1975. At times, there were 200 students in training. From 1975 to 1994 deaf children were taught in the building. In 1994, the Charitable Foundation for Multi-handicapped Deaf, Hard of Hearing and Deaf-Blind took over the facility. From 2000 to 2002, the historic building was partially empty and left to decay, because the "Special Education Centre for Multiple-Handicapped Hearing Impaired" moved to a new building complex in Putbus. Since 2002, the Pädagogium has housed the Putbus IT College, a private education and training facility for computer science professionals.

West of the town is the so-called Primanerloch, which was also linked to the Pedagogium.

==== August-Bebel-Straße ====
In August-Bebel-Straße there are still numerous single-storey tradesman's houses from the time of the town's foundation.

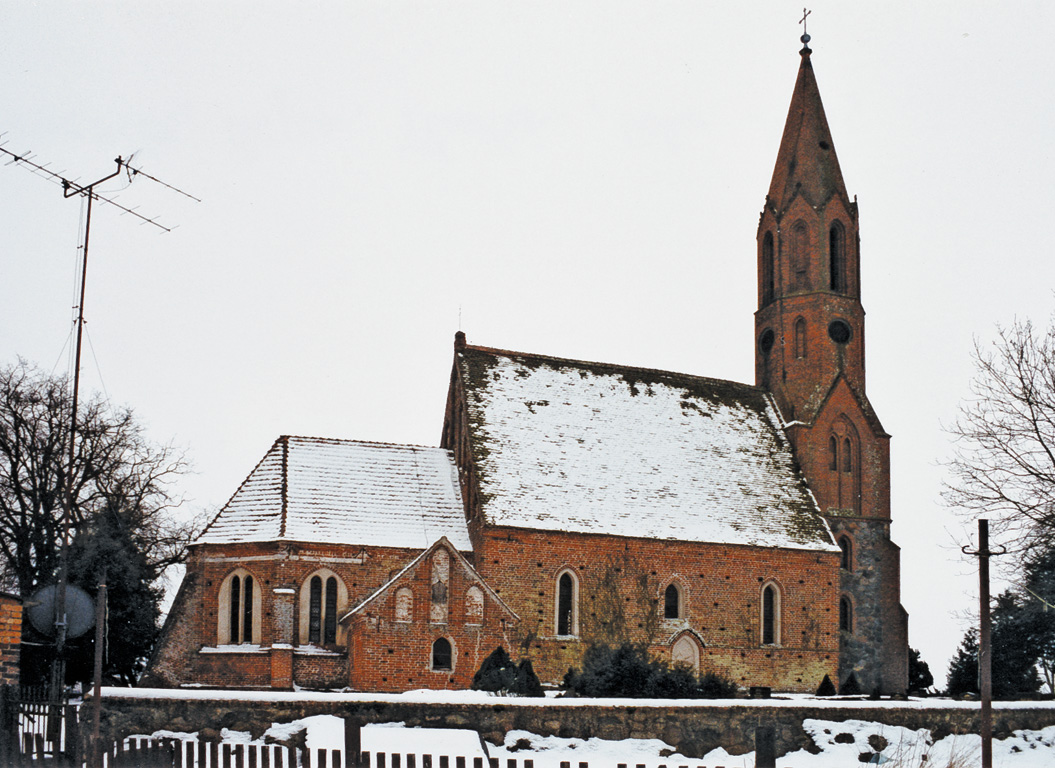
Church in Kasnevitz

==== Church in Kasnevitz ====
In the village of Kasnevitz is St. James' Church which dates to the 2nd half of the 14th century.

==== Bath house and Goor Woods in Lauterbach ====
The Goor bath house was built between 1817 and 1818 in the Classicist style. The bath house was named after the woods that of the Goor-Muglitz Nature Reserve near Lauterbach (Rügen).

==== Memorial to the Victims of Fascism ====
The memorial dates to 1978 and is situation in front of Haus Goor on the beacht at Lauterbach. It commemorates the victims of the forced evacuation of Stutthof concentration camp in April 1945. The memorial was made by the sculptor, Werner Stötzer, with an inscription by the Czech author, Julius Fučík. After the destruction and theft of the urn in 1990 the site was re-inaugurated in 1995.

==== Church in Vilmnitz ====
The Church of St. Mary Magdalene Church is a Late Romanesque/Gothic brick church in the village of Vilmnitz.

==== Megalithic tomb near Lauterbach ====
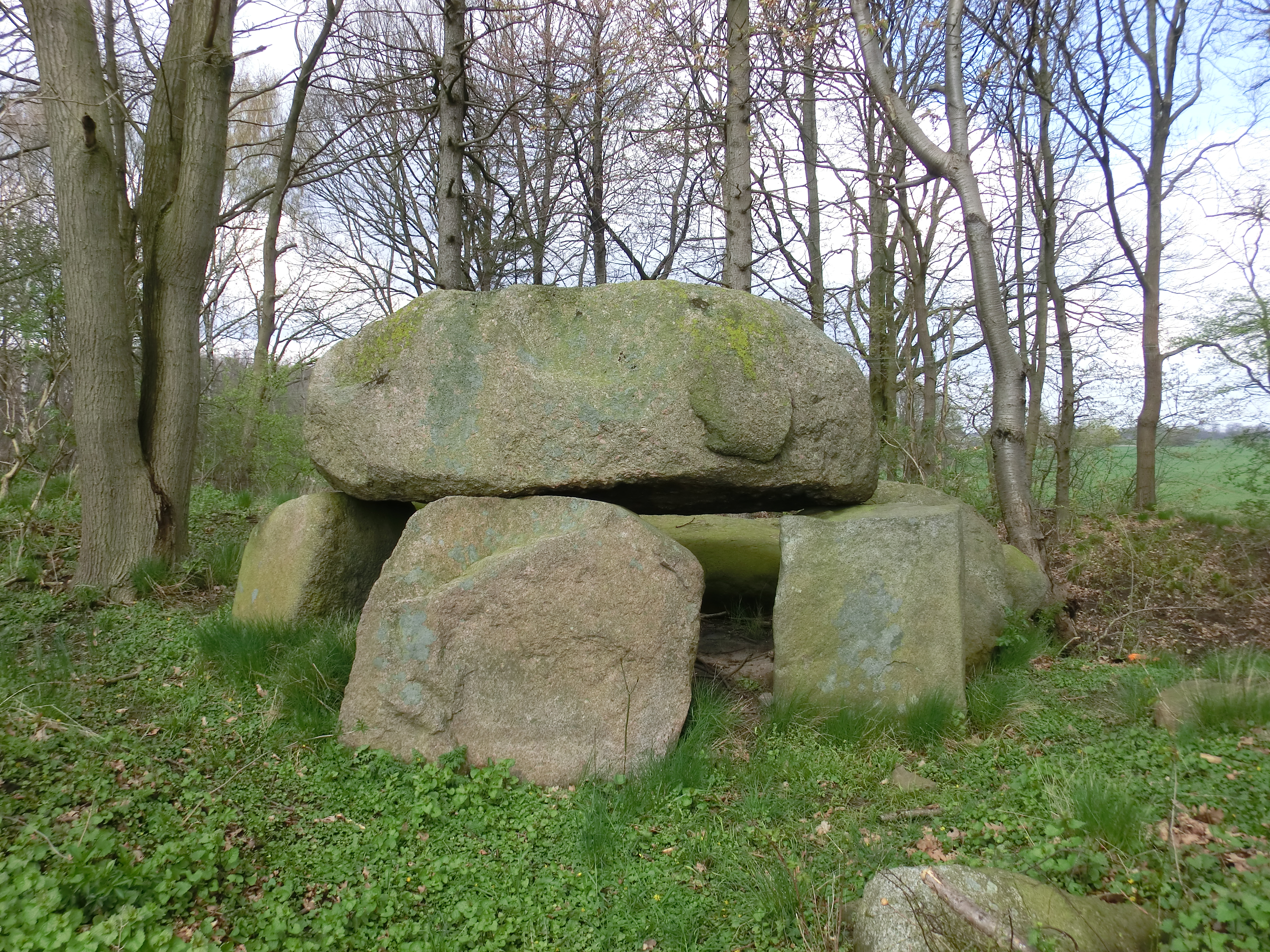
Lonvitz 1 megalithic tomb

Between Lonvitz and Lauterbach on the Rasender Roland railway line there is a megalithic tomb (34°21′01.43″N 13°29′55.33″E) from the New Stone Age.

=== Technical facilities ===
Narrow gauge railway
Putbus is today the start of the narrow gauge line known as the Rasender Roland ("Racing Roland") (gauge: 750 millimetre) running from Lauterbach via Binz to Göhren. This daily operating line was built in from 1895 to 1899 and today is mainly used by tourists. Steam locomotives of Classes 99.48 (built: 1938) and 99.78 (built: 1953) are deployed. Not until 1999 was the line extended to Lauterbach (Mole). Here the standard gauge railway line from Bergen to Lauterbach (Mole) was enhanced between Putbus and Lauterbach by another rail to form a dual gauge track.

In 1999 a modern garage was built to plans by Stralsund architect, Niclas Dünnebacke, that is combined with the light railway station.

Transmission site
Near Putbus is a medium wave transmission site. This facility was used in GDR times to broadcast programmes of the radio station, Radio DDR Ferienwelle. To 2009 it transmitted programmes for Deutschlandradio Kultur in DRM mode. The antenna of the 4 KW transmitter is a 51-metre-high, insulated, guyed, steel lattice mast with a cross-shaped roof capacitor at the top. It was built in 1960.

The Putbus medium wave transmitter, with a frequency of 729 kHz, is the last of its type in Mecklenburg-Vorpommern. In order to save it from being dismantled, in mid-2010 the media authority ran a tender to find private operators. As well as Pomerania the station can also cover Rügen and Usedom, as well as parts of southern Sweden and Schleswig-Holstein.

Also worth mentioning is a weather radar facility with a special radome, that feeds date to the German Weather Service.

=== Regular events ===
From the Putbus events calendar the following regular events with large regional or national following are worth mentioning ntheit:

- May: Putbus Festival – Music concerts at various locations in Putbus
- June: Rügener Holzmesse – Exhibition in Lauterbach to do with the natural raw material, wood (since 1997)
- July: Segel- und Hafenfest in the Putbus subdistrict of Lauterbach
- August: Vilmschwimmen – Tradition-rich swimming competition on the route between the island of Vilm and the harbour in Lauterbach
- September: Kabarett-Regatta Rügen – elite and talented up-and-coming artists of German cabaret in the residence theatre of Putbus (since 1997)

== Transport ==
=== Road ===
The L 29 state road runs through Putbus, which, as one of Rügen's "tourist side roads", forms part of the German Avenue Route - the section from Rügen to Rheinsberg. Putbus is also connected via the L 301 to the city of Bergen.

=== Bus ===
Regional busses connect Putbus to cities nearby, such as Stralsund and Bergen. Busses are operated by the Rügener Personennahverkehr.

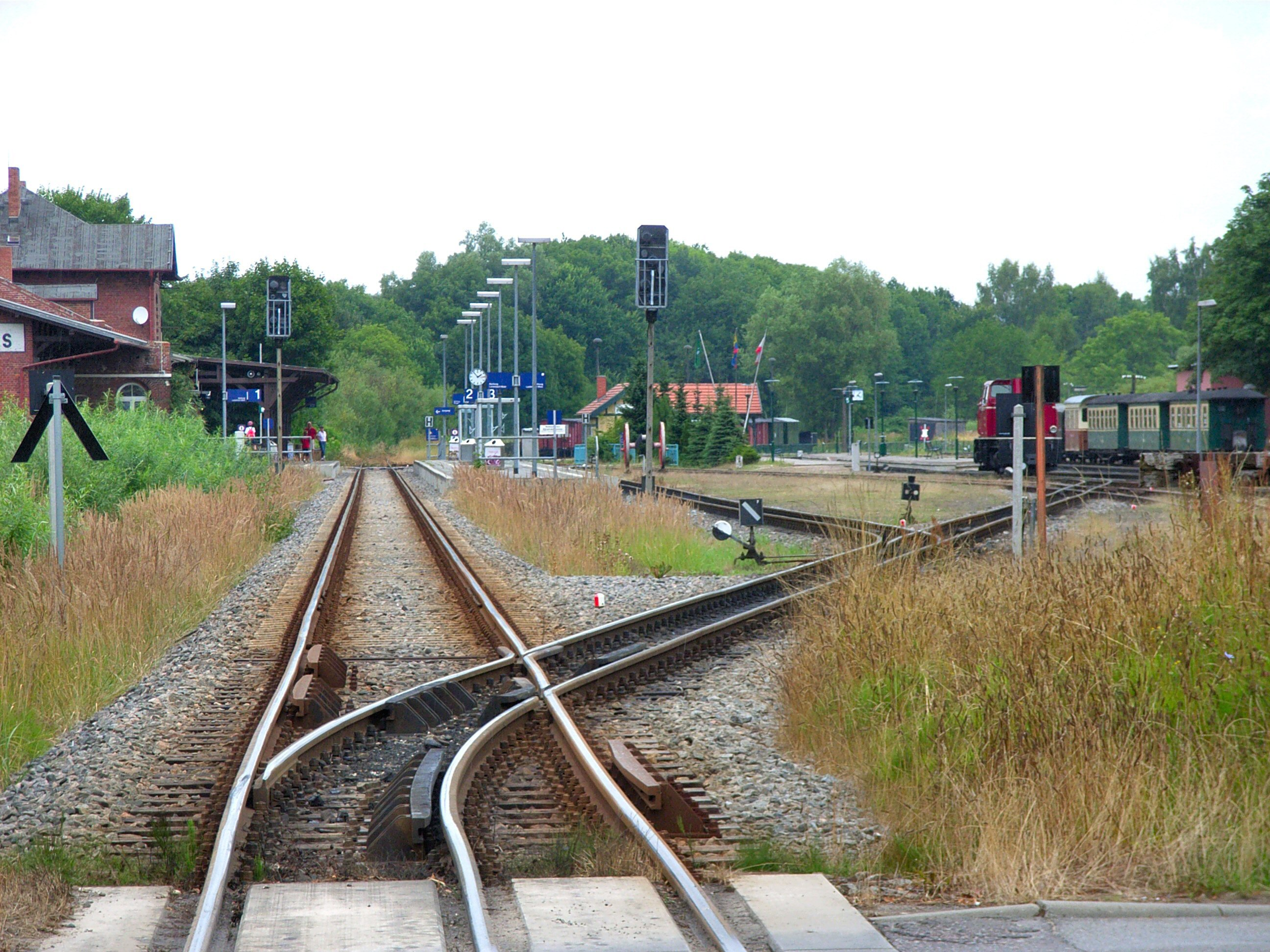
Dual gauge railway system in Putbus station

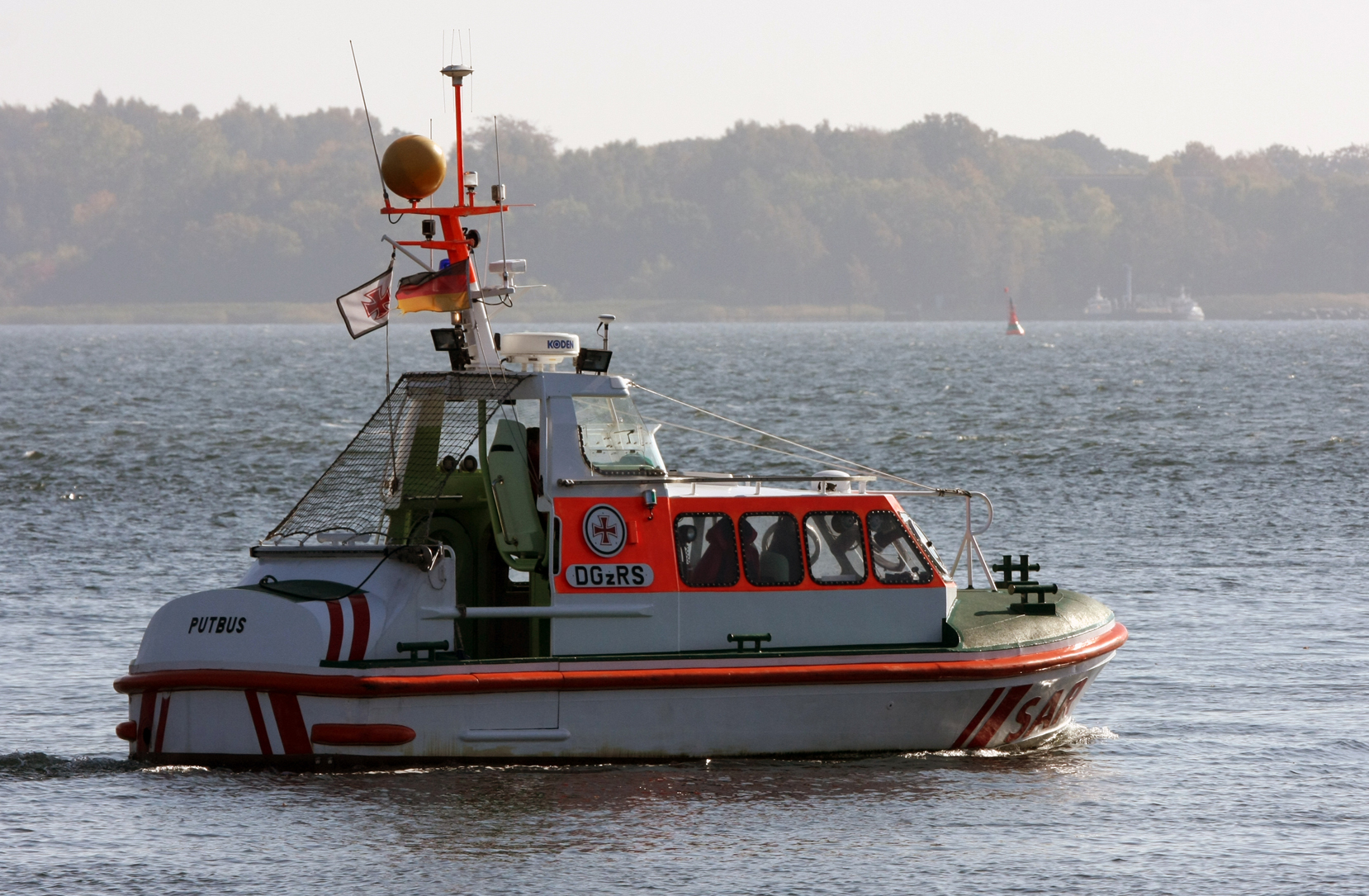
The lifeboat, Putbus

=== Boat ===
The former fishing village of Lauterbach which lies on the shores of the Rügischer Bodden is today a village in the borough of Putbus. From Lauterbach harbour various excursions are offered during the summer season, including trips around the island of Vilm in the Southeast Rügen Biosphere Reserve as well as lagoon cruises through the Rügischen Bodden.

On 7 June 1993 a lifeboat belonging to the German Maritime Search and Rescue Service (DGzRS) was christened with the name Putbus and has since been stationed in the harbour of Lauterbach. The boat, known internally by the DGzRS as SRB 37, was built in 1993 by the Fassmer yard in Bern under works no. 1261 and has the callsign DH 3.

=== Rail ===
Putbus station is on the Bergen auf Rügen–Lauterbach Mole railway as well as the narrow gauge line of the steam train known as Racing Roland from Lauterbach (Mole) via Putbus, Binz, Sellin, and Baabe to Göhren. The common section of two railway lines from Putbus to Lauterbach Mole was equipped with a special dual gauge system for 750 mm and 1435 mm gauge. Thus, trains of both track gauges (narrow and standard gauge operation) run on the section in turn.

== Literature ==
- BIG-Städtebau (editor): Putbus - 10 Jahre Städtebauförderung. Stralsund, 2001
- Andre Farin: Wilhelm Malte zu Putbus und seine Fürstenresidenz auf der Insel Rügen. Eine Biographie über eine norddeutsche Gründerpersönlichkeit des 19. Jahrhunderts. - 4th edition - Putbus, 2007, ISBN 3-00-008844-X.
- Peter Feist: Putbus – Stadt des Klassizismus. Kai Homilius Verlag, Berlin, 1995, ISBN 3-93112-106-2, (extract).
- Andreas Vogel: Johann Gottfried Steinmeyer und Putbus. Thomas Helms Verlag, Schwerin, 2003, ISBN 3931185826.
- Johannes Friedrich Weise: Zwischen Strandleben und Ackerbau – Die Herrschaft Putbus im 19. Jahrhundert. Koch Verlag, Rostock, 2003, ISBN 3-93531-993-2.
