= Nadelitz =

- Ortsteil of Putbus
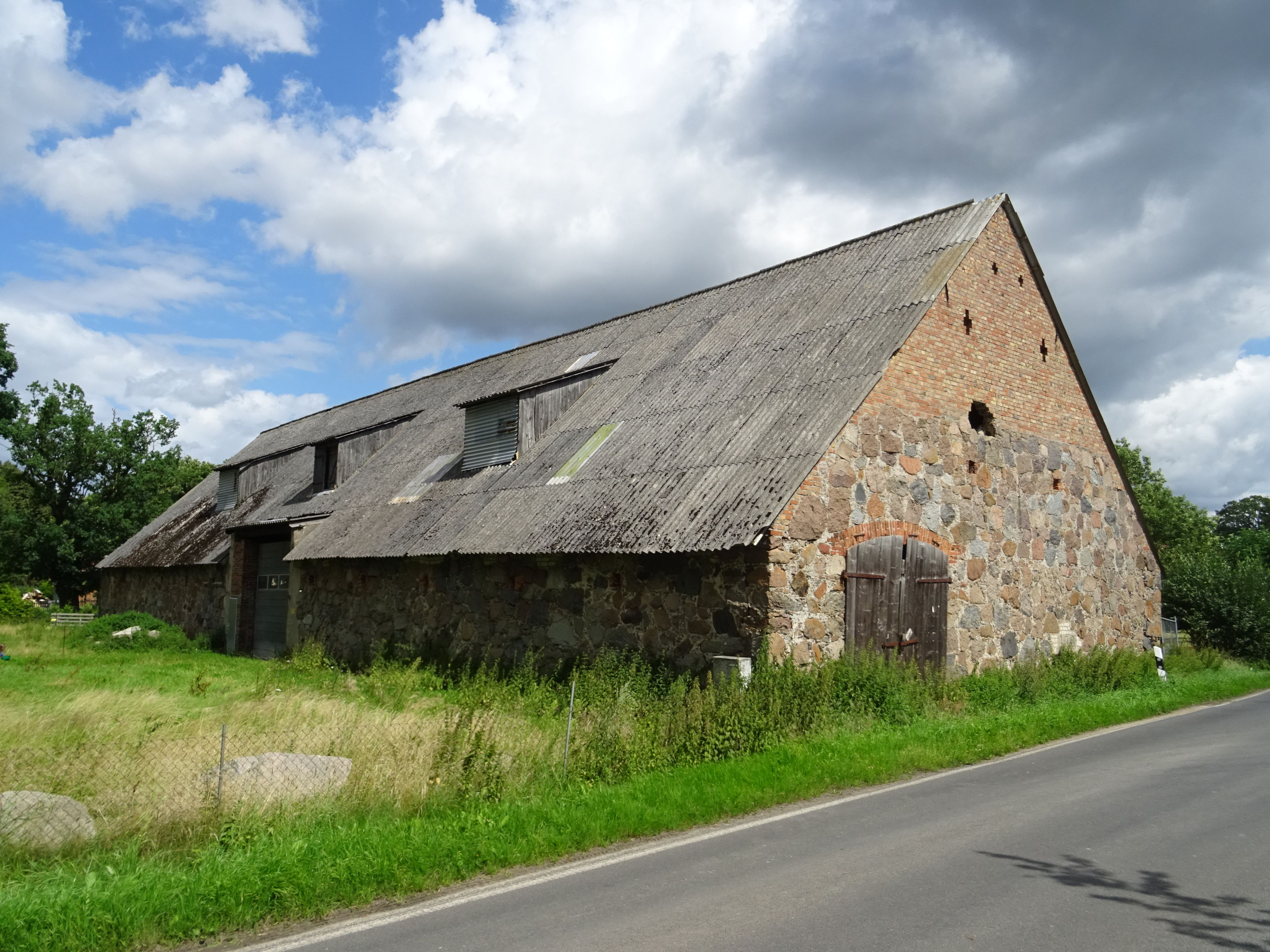
- Fieldstone barn of the former estate.
- Interactive map of Nadelitz
- Location within Germany Location within Mecklenburg-Vorpommern
- Coordinates: 54°21′22″N 13°32′42″E
- Country: Germany
- State: Mecklenburg-Vorpommern
- District: Vorpommern-Rügen
- Municipal assoc.: Bergen auf Rügen
- Town: Putbus
- Time zone: UTC+01:00 (CET)
  - Summer (DST): UTC+02:00 (CEST)
- Postal codes: 18581
- Dialling codes: 038301
- Vehicle registration: RÜG

Nadelitz is a village in the borough of Putbus on the German Baltic Sea island of Rügen. It is a district of the town Putbus in Landkreis Vorpommern-Rügen in Mecklenburg-Vorpommern.

== Geography and transport ==
Nadelitz is located east of the town of Putbus on the Landesstraße 29. To the northeast runs the Bundesstraße 196. To the southwest is the 157 ha large nature reserve Goor-Muglitz.

== Attractions ==
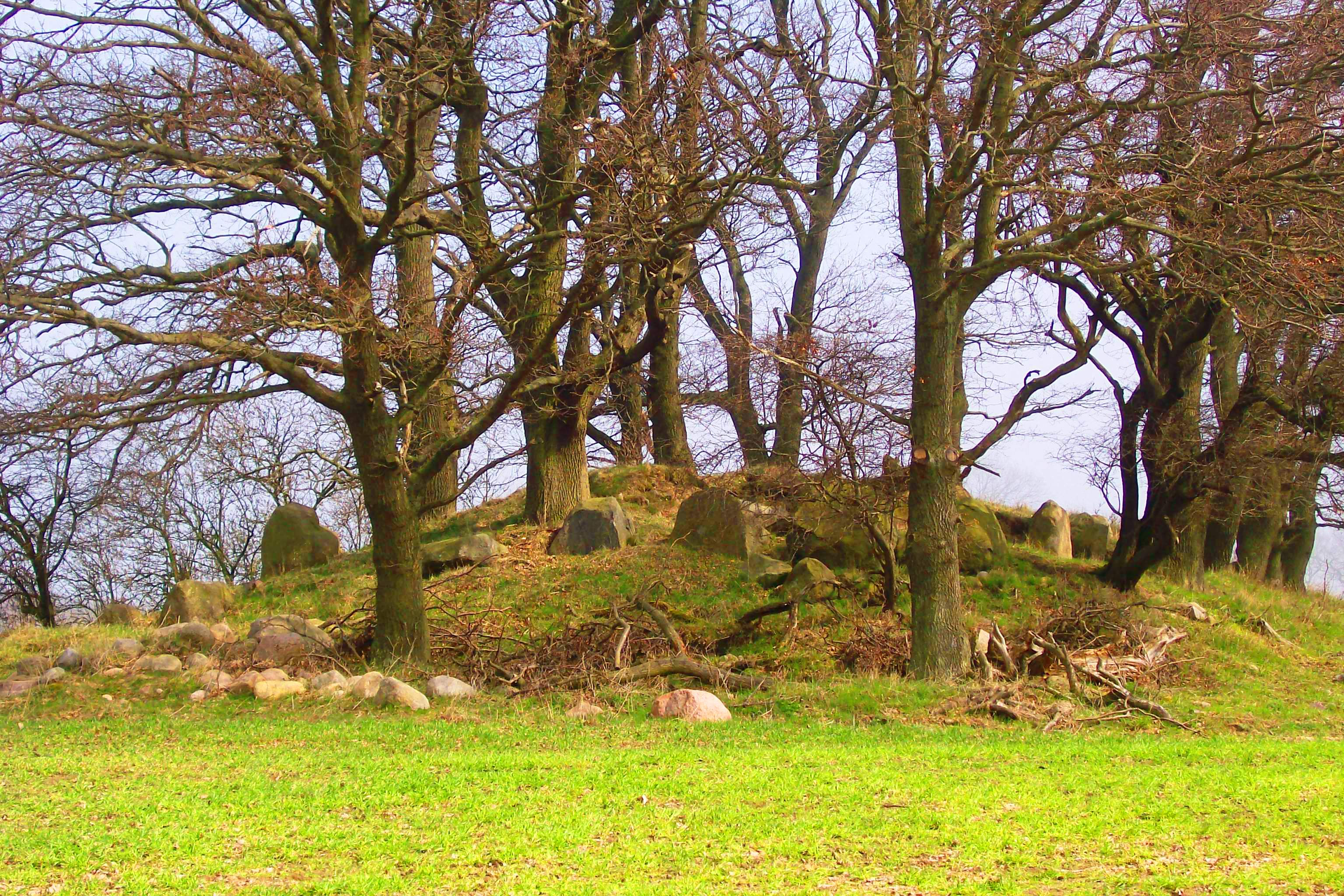
A megalithic grave in vicinity of Nadelitz.

- Fieldstone barn of the former estate (village street)
- Farm worker house (Dorfstraße 11)
- Farmers house (Dorfstraße 12)

== See also ==
- Great dolmen
