= Southeast Rügen Biosphere Reserve =

Biosphere reserve in Mecklenburg-Vorpommern, Germany

Coordinates: 54°24′9″N 13°33′52″E

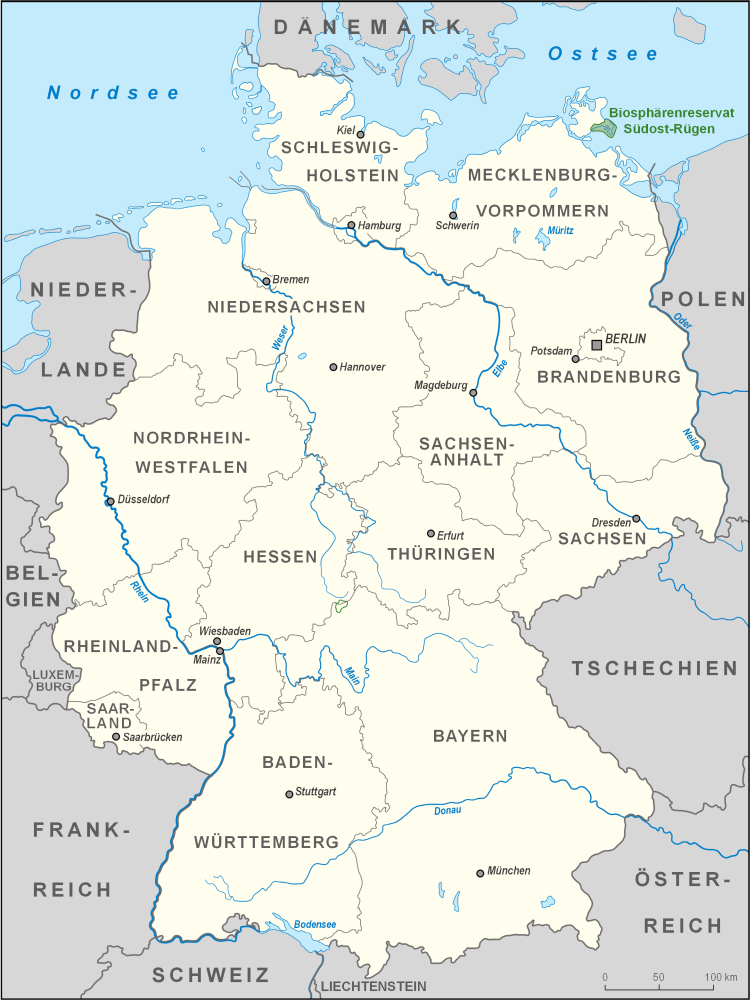
Location

Logo

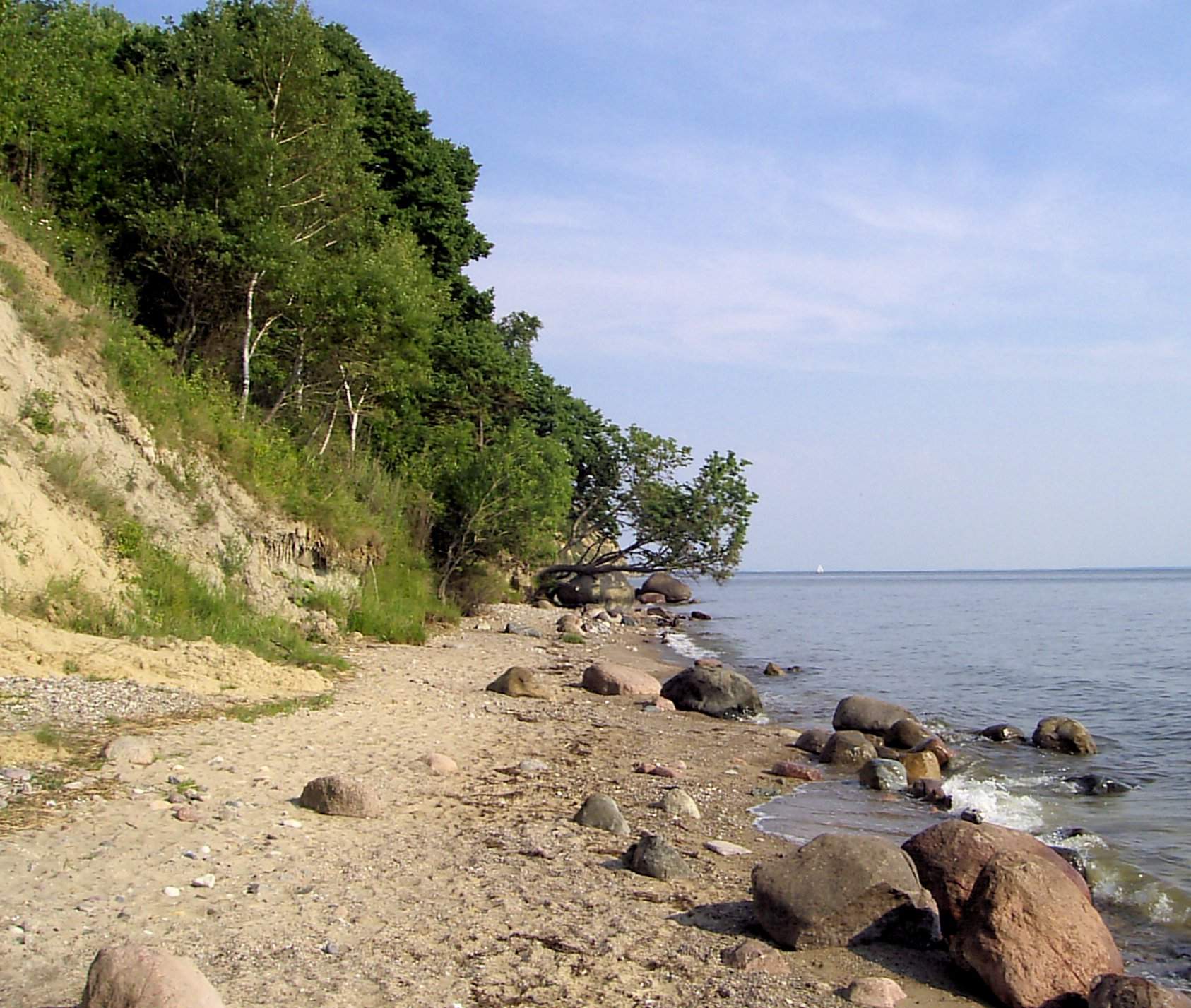
The bodden coast

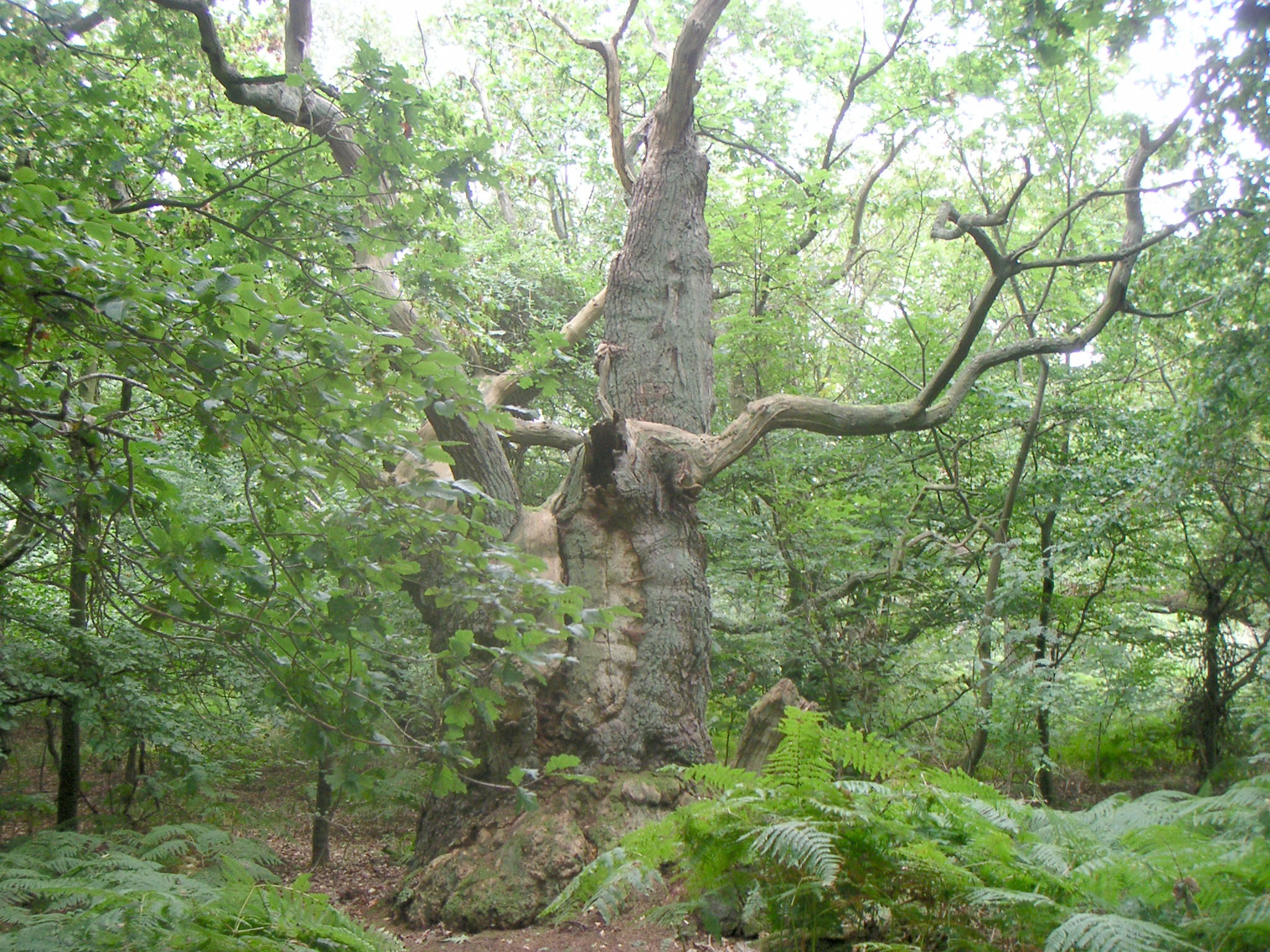
Core zone

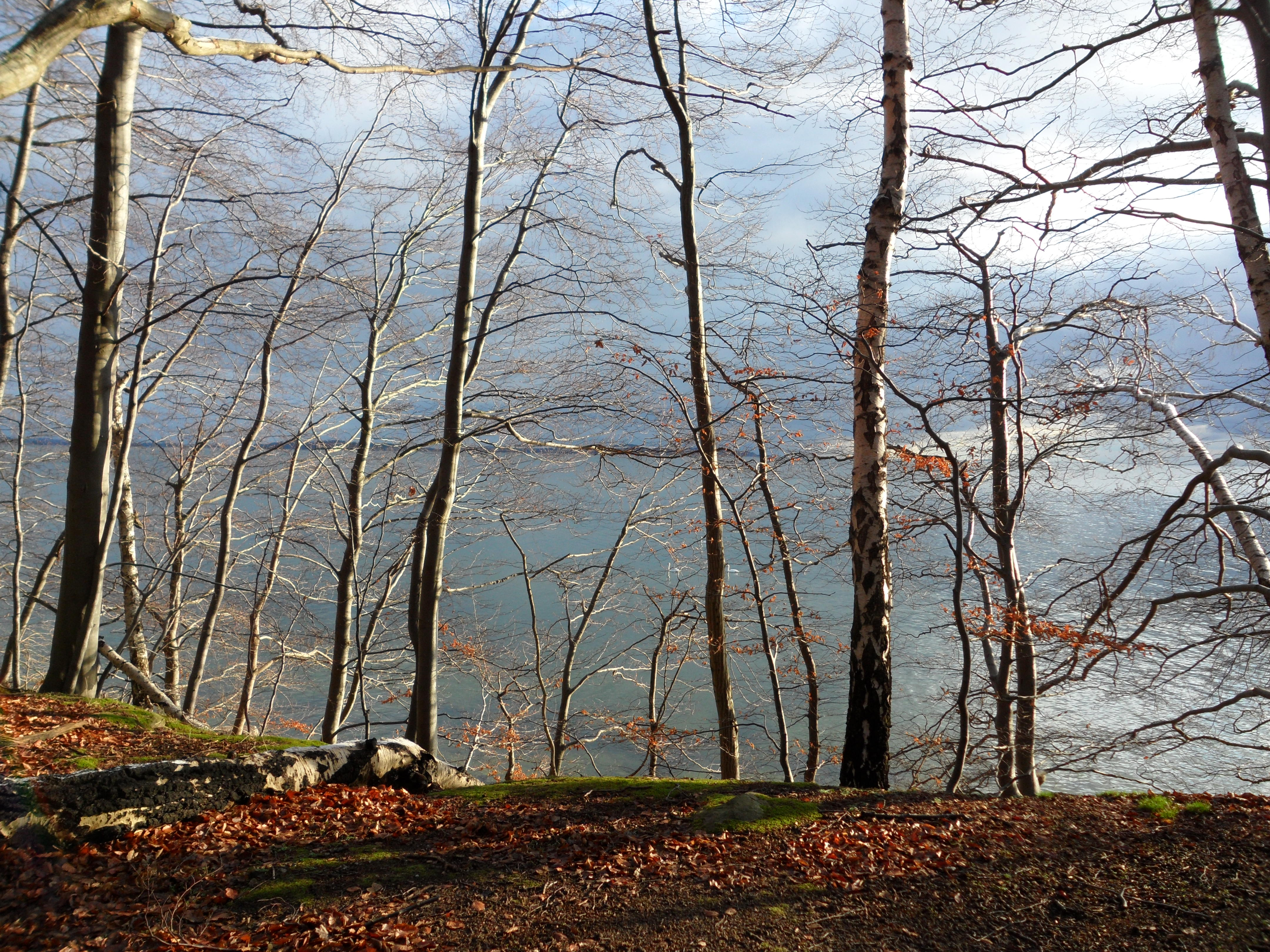
Wood on the cliffed coast at Vilm

The Southeast Rügen Biosphere Reserve (German: Biosphärenreservat Südost-Rügen) is a biosphere reserve in the German state of Mecklenburg-Vorpommern, which covers the southeastern part of the island of Rügen (including Granitz and Mönchgut), the lagoon of Rügischer Bodden between Putbus and Thiessow, the outer coast between Thiessow and Binz and the island of Vilm.

In the biosphere reserve, all the classic landscape and coastal features of the Mecklenburg-Vorpommern littoral are found within one small area. The land is deeply indented here by the sea. One the one hand, peninsulas and coastal headlands are linked by narrow strips of land, on the other side they are separated by lagoons known as boddens and open bays called Wieken locally. There are fine-sanded beaches and rugged cliffed coastlines, at the foot of which are impressive rocky beaches. Broad belts of reed girdle the shores. Beech woods or poor grasslands are found on the sites of terminal moraines and meadows and pastures in the depressions formed after the Ice Ages. Cultural features include megalithic tombs of the New Stone Age, Bronze Age tumuli, medieval churches and village layouts, and the resort architecture of the Modern Era.

It was made a biosphere reserve in 1990 as part of the GDR's national park programme.

- Area: 235 km^{2}
- Its variety of species includes its:
  - great importance as a rest and breeding area for migratory birds, mainly various species of goose (greylag, bean and greater white-fronted geese)
  - bee species: e. g. furry, apex-furrowed and cone bees; cuckoo and social wasps.
  - colonies of seagrass, red and green algae in the nearshore areas of the Bay of Greifswald that form spawning grounds for Baltic Sea herring.

The biosphere reserve has several core zones or total reserves. These include the Schwarzer See in the Granitz as well as the islands of Vilm and parts of the Mönchgut and Zicker peninsulas.

== Nature reserves ==
The seven nature reserves cover an area of 4,084 hectares:

- Goor-Muglitz (142 ha)
- Granitz (1162 ha)
- Insel Vilm (171 ha)
- Mönchgut (2320 ha)
- Neuensiener und Selliner See (213 ha)
- Quellsumpf Ziegensteine bei Groß Stresow (4 ha)
- Wreechener See (72 ha)

== Literature ==
- "Land und Leute im Biosphärenreservat Südost-Rügen" (PDF). Amt für das Biosphärenreservat Südost-Rügen. 2007. p. 96.
- http://www.biosphaerenreservat-suedostruegen.de/de/biosphaerenreservat
- Umweltministerium Mecklenburg-Vorpommern (Hrsg.) (2003): Die Naturschutzgebiete Mecklenburg-Vorpommerns, Schwerin, Demmler Verlag
- Autorenkollektiv (1990): Mönchgut - eine Landschaftsstudie, Göhren/Greifswald, Ostseedruck Rostock/Bt Putbus© GeoBasis-DE/M-V 2010
- Frey, Hildegard: Rügen, 2. Auflage, Deutscher Wanderverlag, Stuttgart 1996.
