= Goor (Rügen) =

Coordinates: 54°20′39″N 13°30′41″E

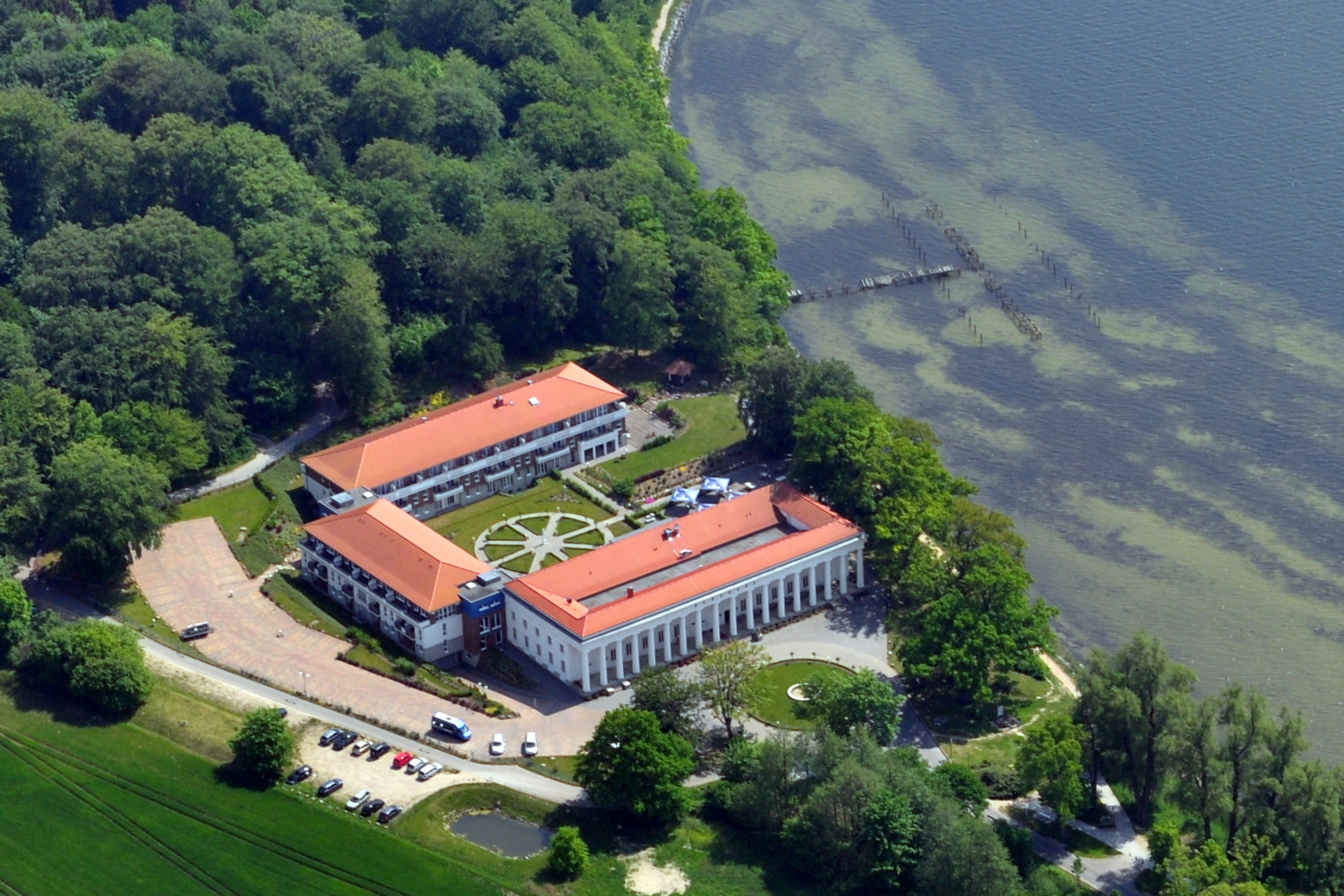
Goor in 2011

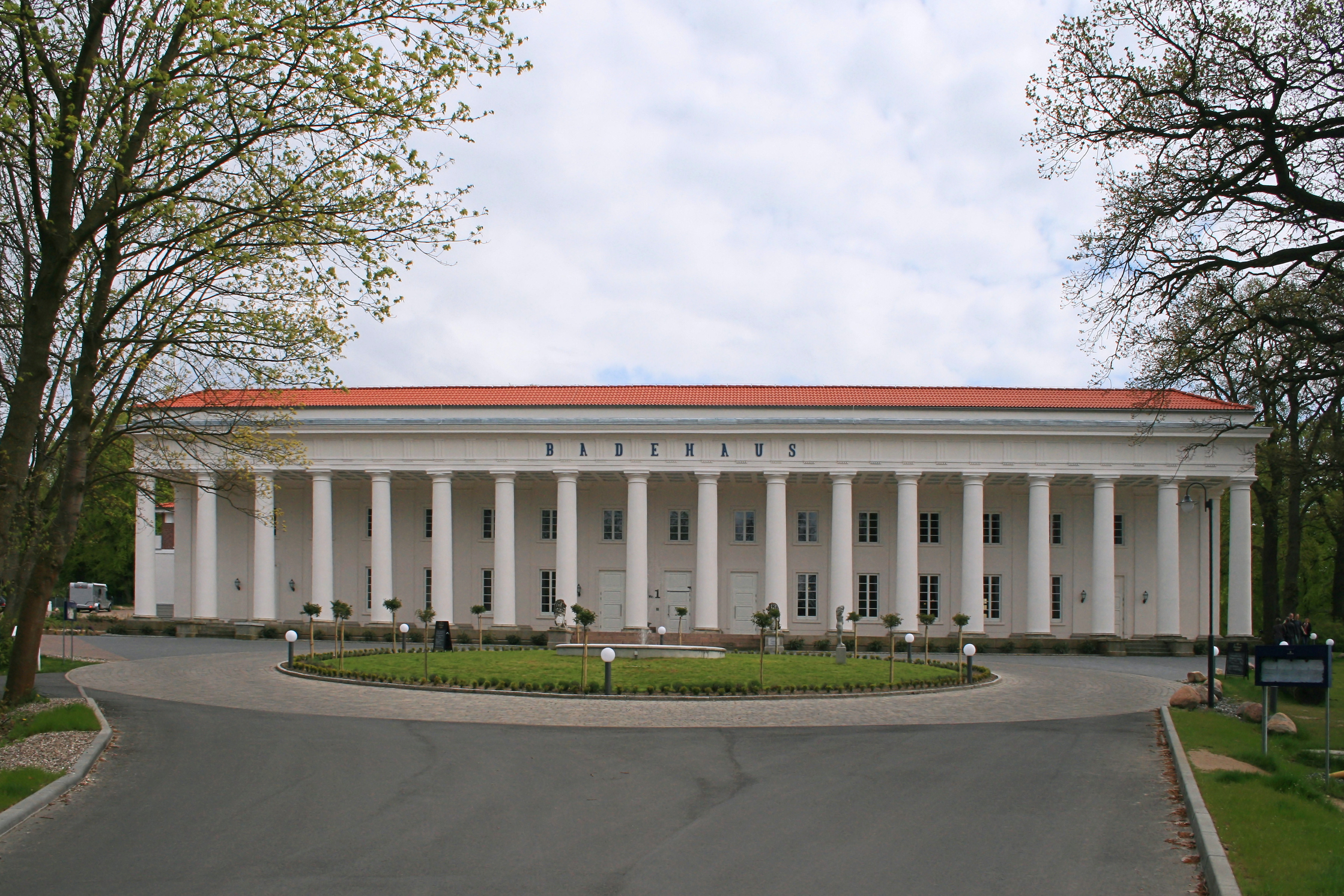
Goor Bath House after rebuilding work in 2007

The Goor is a woodland, seven hectares in area, on the German Baltic Sea island of Rügen near Lauterbach, a village in the borough of Putbus, which runs for about 1.5 km directly along the shore of the Bay of Greifswald. The woods of the Goor consist predominantly of beech and English oak. They are designated as a nature reserve and are popular with walkers.

== Bath house ==
In 1817/1818, Prince Wilhelm Malte I of Putbus had a 50 metre long bath house built here for his residence town of Putbus. The then Frederick William Baths (Friedrich-Wilhelm-Bad) were, like several other buildings in Putbus, designed by Johann Gottfried Steinmeyer. An imposing avenue runs from Putbus, two kilometres away, to the impressive facade of the building, which is characterised by a hypostyle hall with 18 white columns. The present Goor Bath House (Badehaus Goor) was modified several times over the course of time. After the Second World War it was used as a holiday home for the Ironwork Combine East (Eisenhüttenkombinat Ost, EKO) in Eisenhüttenstadt. After a thorough renovation and rebuilding it was re-opened in April 2007, expanded with modern annexes, as a spa hotel.
