= Lauterbach (Rügen) =

Village in Germany

Coordinates: 54.343°N 13.500°E

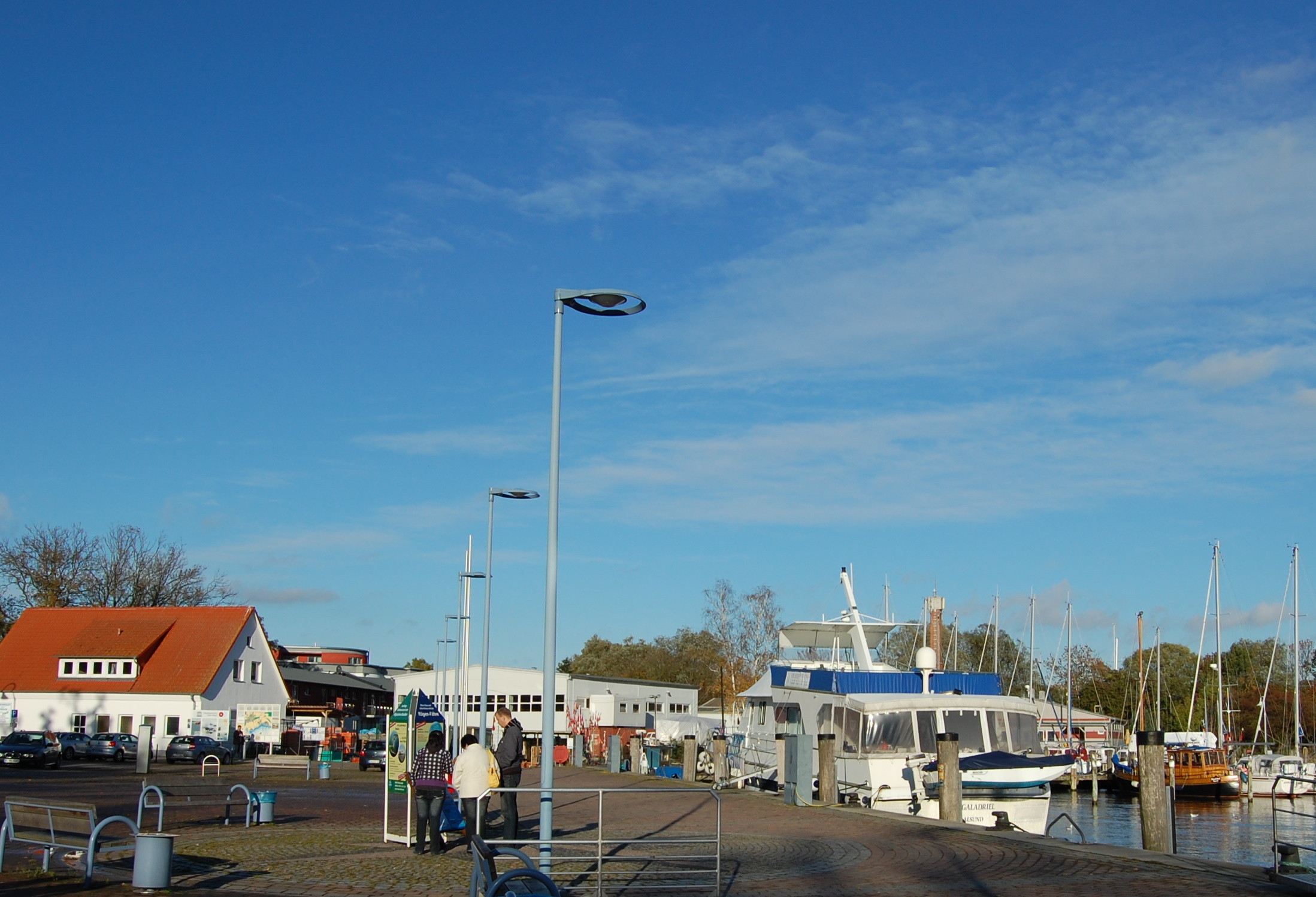
Lauterbach harbour

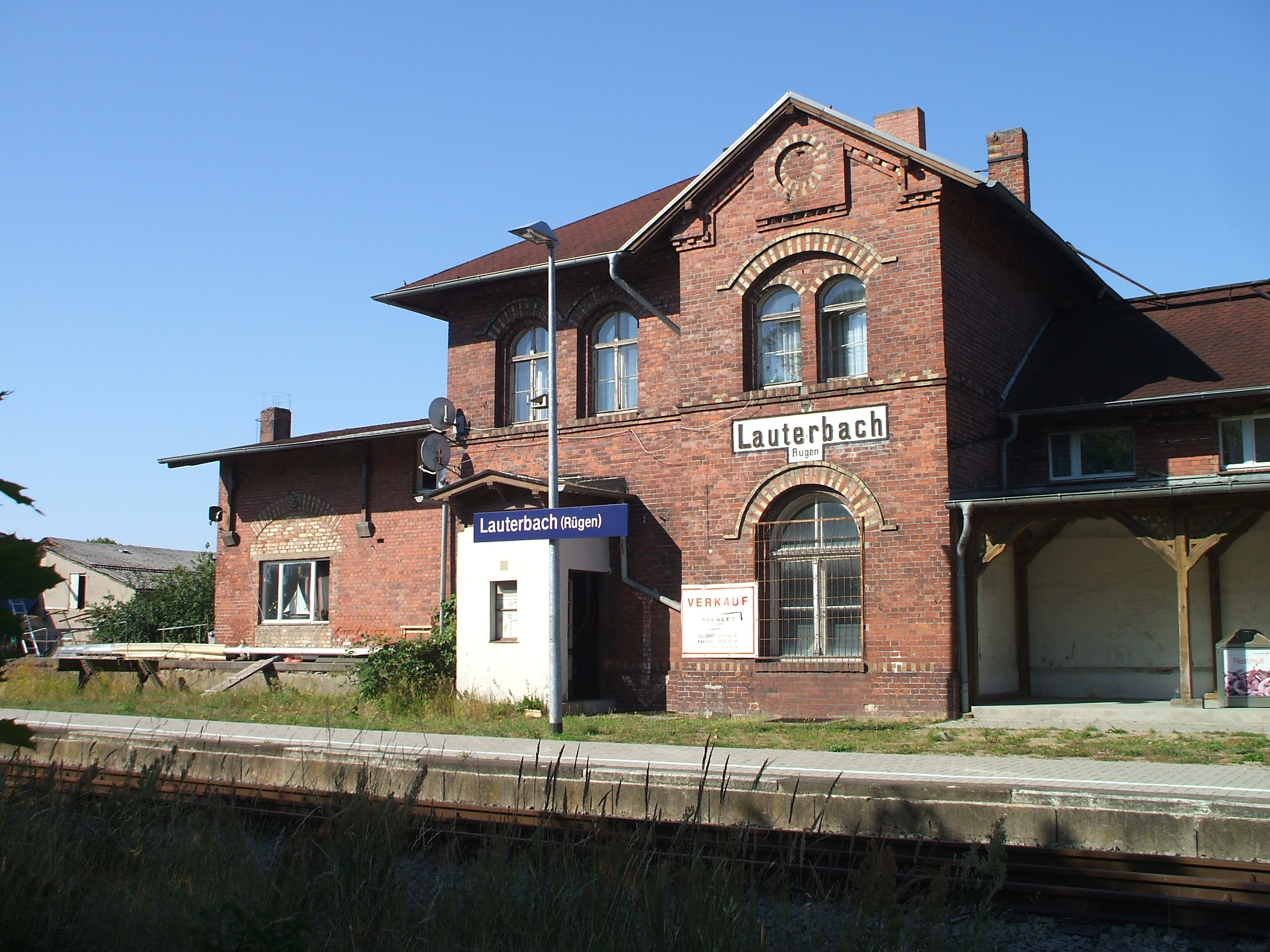
Lauterbach station

Lauterbach (German pronunciation: [ˈlaʊtɐbax]) is a village in the borough of Putbus on the German Baltic Sea island of Rügen.

The village has a population of about 500 and lies southeast of Putbus on the Bay of Greifswald. Lauterbach has a harbour and a connexion, via a branch line, to both the standard gauge railway network and the Rügen Light Railway.

== History ==
The first known modern settlement in the area was in 1819 when a paper mill was built between the Goor woods and Neuendorf. Previously, Prince Wilhelm Malte of Putbus had established the first seaside resort on Rügen in 1816 on the beach at Neuendorf further to the south. Initially this resort only consisted of tents and bathing machines. In 1817/1818 a permanent bathing house was built in the Goor.

In order to enable boats to land, it was decided in 1834 to build a landing stage. The site chosen for this, however, was the calmer bay of the present-day Lauterbach, and not Neuendorf. Between 1833 and 1836 the first settlement appeared here as a result. The first records of this date to 1840. At that time the settlement had 7 houses. Thanks to the construction of the jetty, boats from Sweden and Oderkähne and steamships from Stettin and Stralsund docked. Bathing services soon reduced, but boat-building, fishing and trade remained prominent for many years.

The name of the village comes from the wife of the Prince of Putbus, whose maiden name was von Lauterbach.

In 1890 the railway line from Bergen to Lauterbach was completed. The station building is a listed building. In 1901, construction of the harbour started and it was completed the following year.

== Economy ==
There are various small businesses in Lauterbach running restaurants and accommodation. The harbour is important for the local economy, being also used as a marina. Passenger boats also call at the harbour. An important tourist destination is the island of Vilm, not far from Lauterbach. Boatbuilding and fishing are still carried on.

== Personalities ==
The Japanologist Jürgen Berndt (1933–1993) and the photographer Botho Walldorf (b. 1945) were born in Lauterbach. The painter Karl Bock (1873–1940) worked for some time in Lauterbach from 1918/19, the physicist Marion Asche (1935–2013) spent parts of her childhood there.

== Literature ==
- Georg Jung, Meerumschlungen und kreidegrün, Rügen von A-Z, Ellert & Richter Verlag Hamburg 2009, ISBN 978-3-8319-0381-8, page 82
- André Farin, Lauterbach. Rügens ältestes Seebad. Hafenort. Bootsbautradition. Mit Kindheitserinnerungen der Lauterbacherin Marlene Lübbe, geb. Wiechmann. - 2nd ed. - Lauterbach 2012, ISBN 978-3-00-036509-6
