= Goor-Muglitz Nature Reserve =

Nature reserve in Mecklenburg-Vorpommern, Germany

- Location within Mecklenburg-Vorpommern Location within Germany
- Nearest city: Lauterbach (west); Freetz (north)
- Coordinates: 54°20′35″N 13°31′12″E
- Area: 157 hectares (0.61 sq mi)

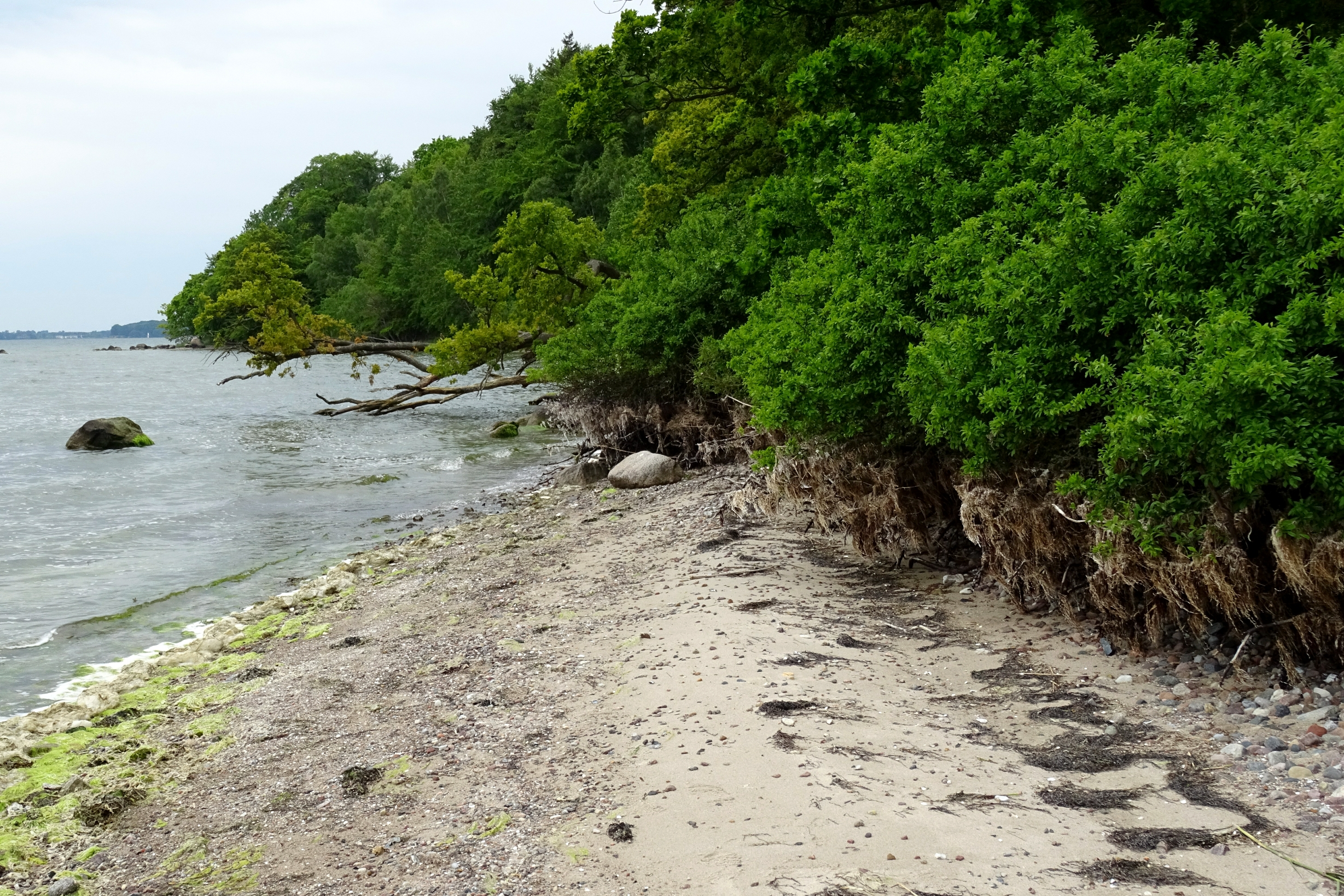
Goor Muglitz

The Goor-Muglitz Nature Reserve (German: Naturschutzgebiet Goor-Muglitz) is a nature reserve, covering an area of 157 hectares, in the German state of Mecklenburg-Vorpommern. It lies on the island of Rügen on the northern coastline of the Bay of Greifswald. It was granted protected status on 12 September 1990 as part of the creation of the Southeast Rügen Biosphere Reserve. The conservation aim of the two-part nature reserve is, on the one hand, the preservation and development of a deciduous forest of old trees in the Goor forest and the preservation of Freetz Lowland (Freetzer Niederung) and, on the other hand, the protection of a steep wooded slope near Muglitz, which is interspersed with wild fruit trees. The areas are in conservation zone 2 (buffer zone) of the biosphere reserve. The rocky shallow areas of the bay are also a protected area.

The neighbouring villages are Lauterbach to the west and Freetz to the north.

The status of the area is classified as "good" as the areas are able to develop largely undisturbed. However, interventions are being carried out to mitigate the effects of the past; such effects as the planting of conifers in some areas and the drainage of Freetz Lowland.

Parts of the areas are owned by the Mecklenburg-Western Pomerania Foundation for the Environment and Conservation as well as the Michael Succow Foundation.

Under EU law, the nature reserve is part of the SAC known as Southeast Rügen Coastal Landscape (Küstenlandschaft Südostrügen). Access to the nature reserve is possible using several public footpaths. The Succow Foundation has set up a nature trail.

== History ==
The Goor was formed during the last ice age. The sandy soils indicate a kame. Today, the Goor, which is up to 36 metres high, is flanked to the east by the Freetz Lowland, which is located in an area of glacial ground moraine

== Literature ==
- Umweltministerium Mecklenburg-Vorpommern, ed. (2003), "Goor-Muglitz 187", Die Naturschutzgebiete in Mecklenburg-Vorpommern (in German), Schwerin: Demmler-Verlag, pp. 252f, ISBN 3-91-015052-7
- Deickert, S. (2007). "Im Spannungsfeld von Kultur und "Wildnis" - Eine Themenweg-Konzeption für das Wald-NSG "Goor" im Biosphärenreservat Südost-Rügen" (PDF). p. 133.
