= Vilm =

German island in the Baltic Sea

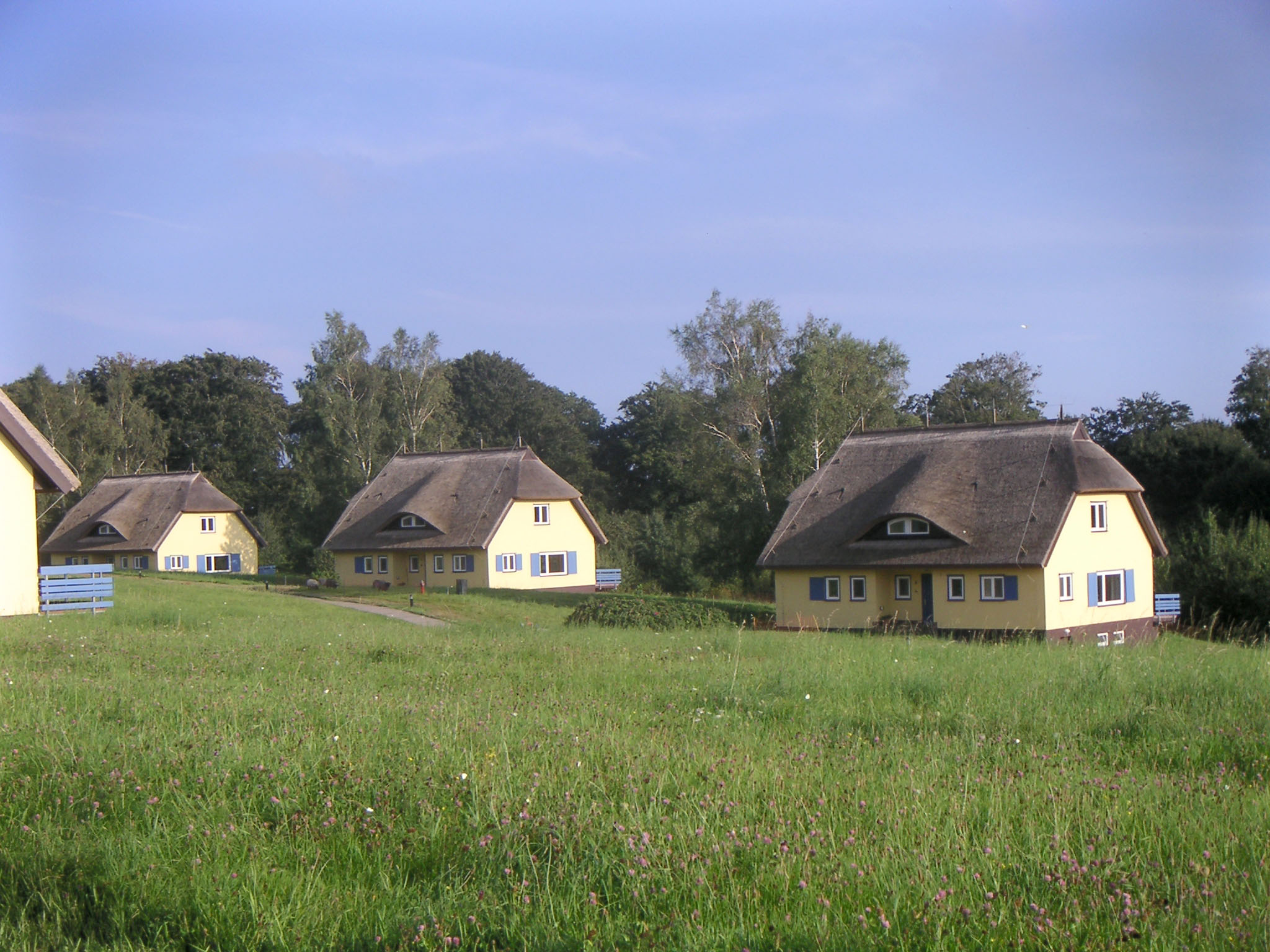
- Guest houses on Vilm

- Location within Germany

Geography
- Coordinates: 54°19′N 13°32′E
- Area: 0.94 km^{2} (0.36 sq mi)
- Length: 2.5 km (1.55 mi)
- Highest elevation: 37.7 m (123.7 ft)
- Highest point: Groß Vilm

Administration
- Germany
- State: Mecklenburg-Vorpommern
- District: Vorpommern-Rügen

Additional information
- The island may be visited only by prior arrangement.

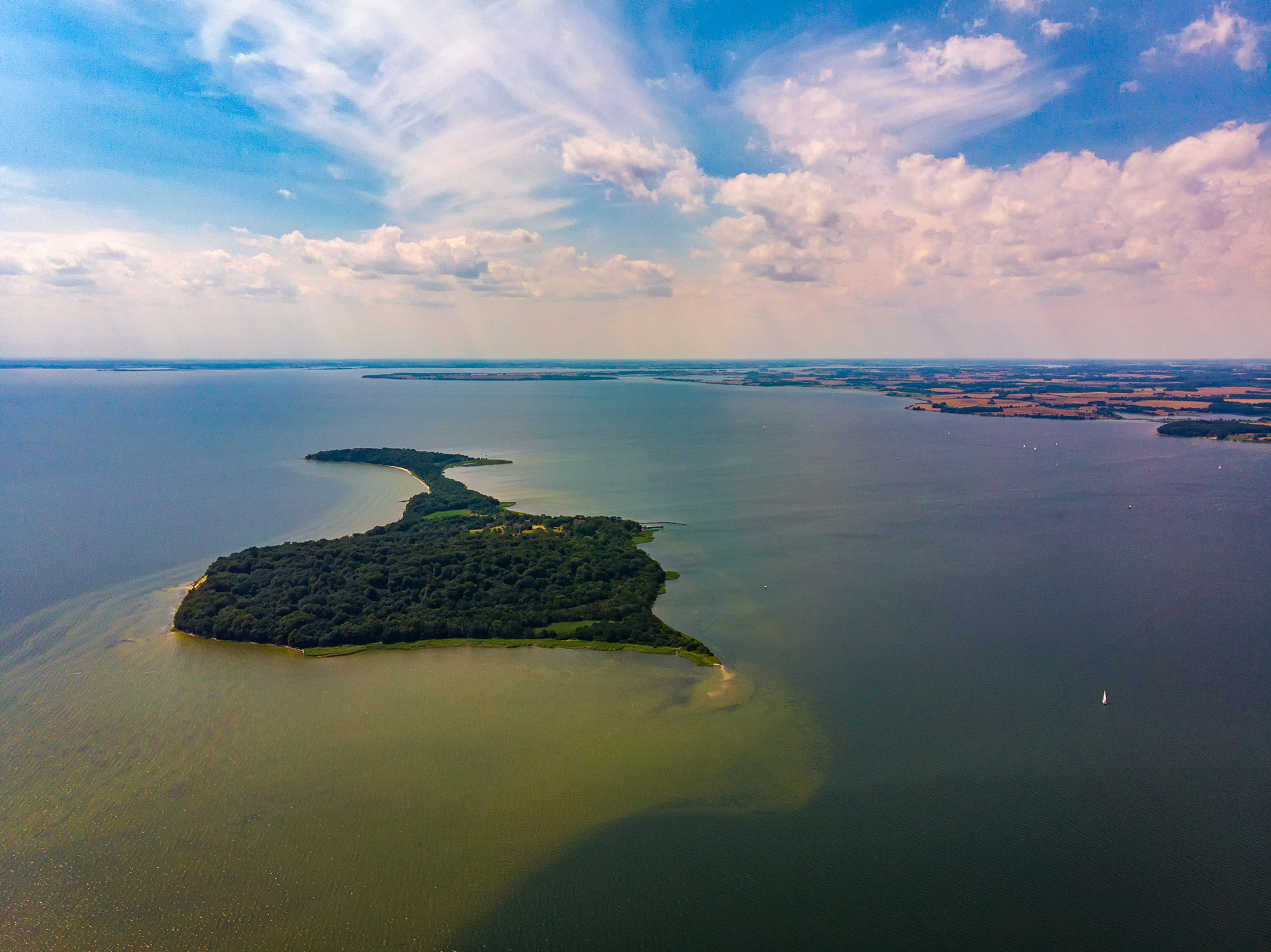
Vilm

Vilm is a Baltic Sea island in the bay south of the much larger island of Rügen, and is one of Germany's most remote and tranquil spots. Covering less than 1 square kilometre (0.39 sq mi), Vilm is the remnant of a moraine left as the glaciers retreated about 6000 years ago. Since its formation the shape of the island has gradually changed, with sandbars and beaches forming and eroding continuously. Today the island is shaped like a 2.5-kilometre-long (1.6 mi) tadpole, consisting of two distinct parts. Great Vilm, the "head" to the north-east, rises to almost 40 metres (130 ft). The low-lying isthmus of Middle Vilm forms a long "tail" to the south-west, which culminates in Little Vilm, a rocky mound about 20 metres (66 ft) above sea level. The chalky cliffs to the southern side of Great Vilm are rapidly eroding, while sandbanks are building to add a snail-like curl to the tail.

== History ==
Vestiges on the island suggest that humans used it in the early Stone Age, not long after its formation. Slavic peoples built a temple there, and its use for spiritual purposes persisted into Christian times, when in the Middle Ages it became a place of pilgrimage. In the early 19th century a law was passed to prevent trees from being felled on the island, and it became a summer residence for aristocrats. In 1936 the fauna and flora of the island were placed under protection to preserve its ancient oak and beech woodlands. After the second world war, Vilm became a favourite destination for tourists from German cities. By 1957 the island's public restaurant was used by some 700 visitors a day.

In 1959 the Council of Ministers of the German Democratic Republic (GDR) closed the island to the public and constructed 11 guesthouses, administrative and farm buildings. From then until the dissolution of the GDR, they used it as a private retreat for high functionaries, including the GDR heads of state Walter Ulbricht and Erich Honecker. Manor homes were built for the "communist elite" and the restaurant served no other customers.

Two days before the end of the GDR, on 1 October 1990, the government designated the island and surrounding seas as a landscape protection area of central importance with the designation "southeast-southwest-Rügen biosphere reserve". This and other protected areas could not by law be transferred to the Federal Republic of Germany directly; instead the GDR had to sign them over to an individual who could then sign them over to the Federal Republic of Germany. This is how it came to be that the island of Vilm and many other protected areas belonged for one logical second to Christian Patermann, then a high official in the Ministry of the Environment, now retired, but at one time a director in the European Commission.

Thus the island came not only under the administration of the state of Mecklenburg-Western Pomerania but also the responsibility of the Federal Agency for Nature Conservation (Bundesamt für Naturschutz), which confirmed its designation as a nature reserve, a core area of the Southeast-Rügen Biosphere Reserve.

Three days after its adoption by the Federal Republic of Germany, the "International Nature Conservation Academy" was incorporated under the Federal Agency for Nature Conservation. The academy, which maintains and uses the GDR buildings as an ecological research station, is mandated to provide scientific support to the Federal Secretary of the Environment in matters concerning national and international nature conservation and landscape management, international cooperation, ecosystems, environmental monitoring and research in the Baltic Sea area, and the transfer of scientific method and knowledge.

== Nature ==
Although it is small, the surprising natural diversity and beauty of the Isle of Vilm has attracted hundreds of landscape painters over the last two centuries. Most of it is covered in forest that has been undisturbed for decades, and even centuries, with the result that its oak and beech woods are among the most untouched and impressive in Germany, and the island boasts a rich diversity of birds and small mammals. Part of the island – most of Middle Vilm and all of Little Vilm – is strictly closed to all human presence. Swimming is not permitted from any of its beaches. In the winter the bay sometimes freezes, and people can walk across the ice to and from Rügen – though most prefer to take the icebreaker.

Today, the core of the island is designated as protected zone I of the biosphere reserve, while the cleared area with guesthouses is part of the protected zone II, the so-called development and care zone.

The scientists who work on Vilm do not live there, but travel to and from the island daily. The agency has modified some of the buildings for conferences. Conference participants are housed in the cottages built for the ministers. The only thing on the island to distract the delegates from their work is nature; there are no shops, no TV, and no newspapers. Its isolation and complete quiet make it a perfect place for thinking.

The island may be visited only by prior arrangement, via a ferry boat from Lauterbach, from March to October. A maximum of 60 visitors per day are allowed on Vilm.

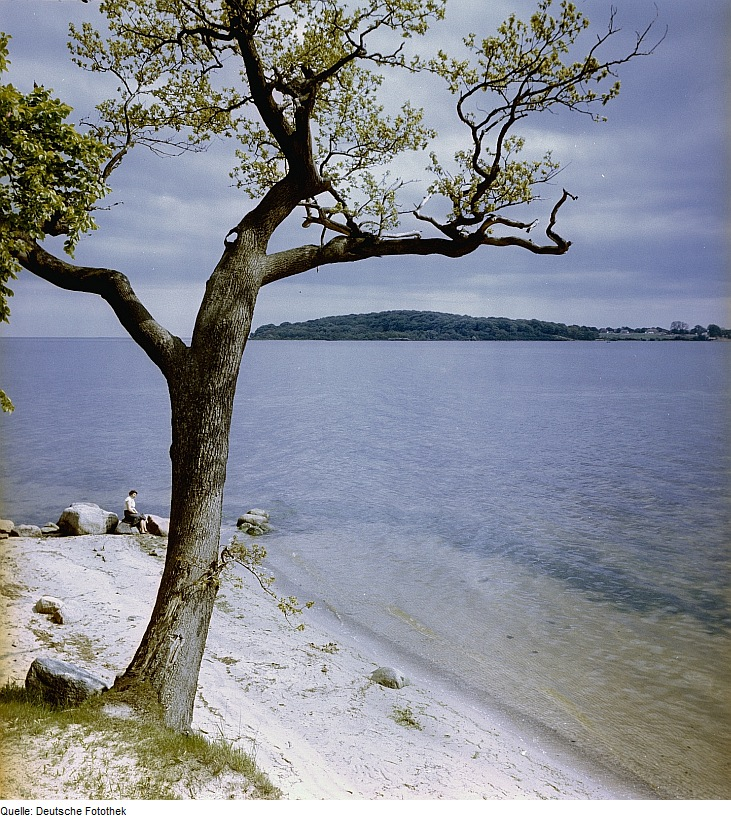
View towards Vilm from Rugia Island

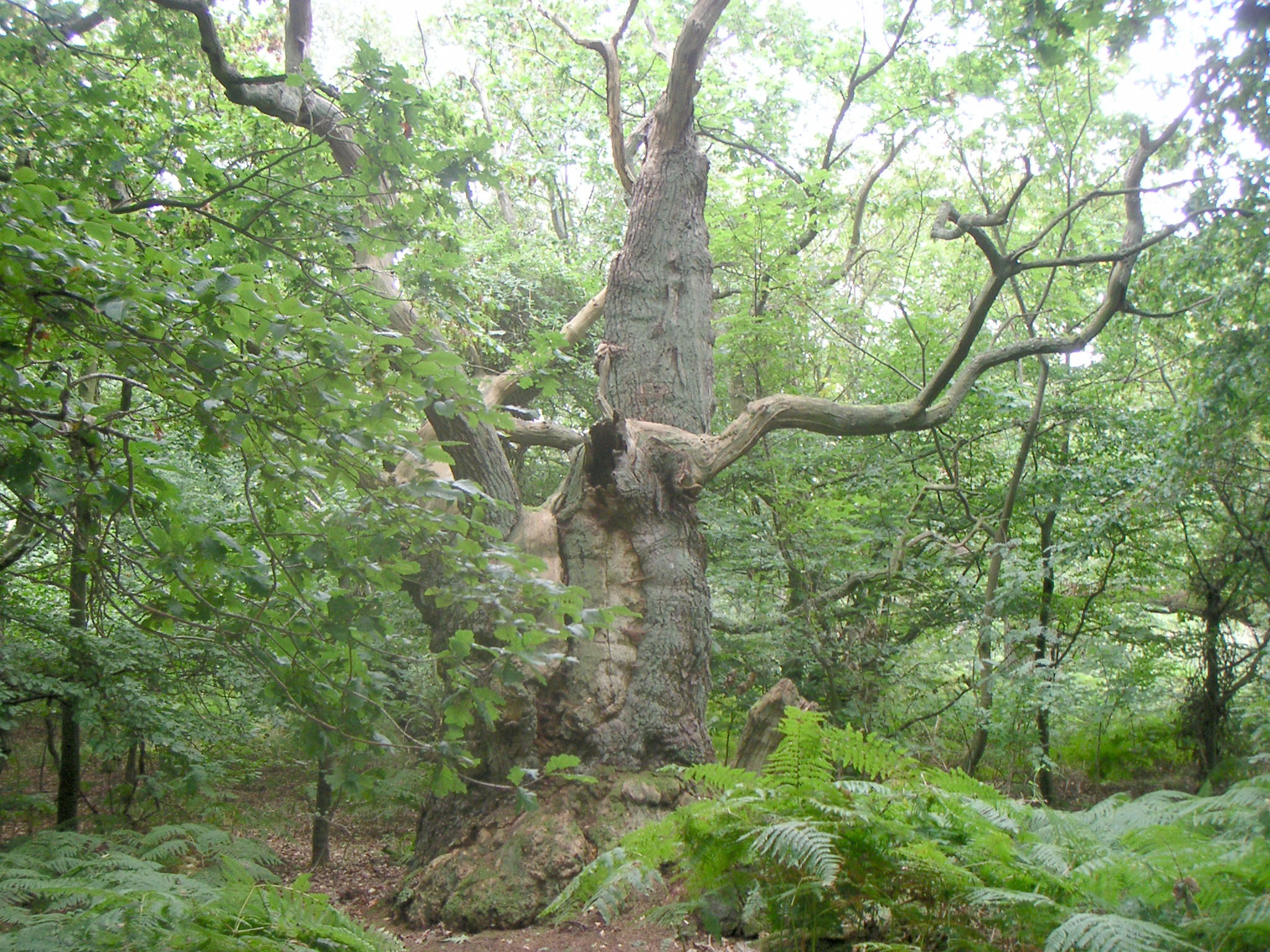
An ancient oak tree on Vilm

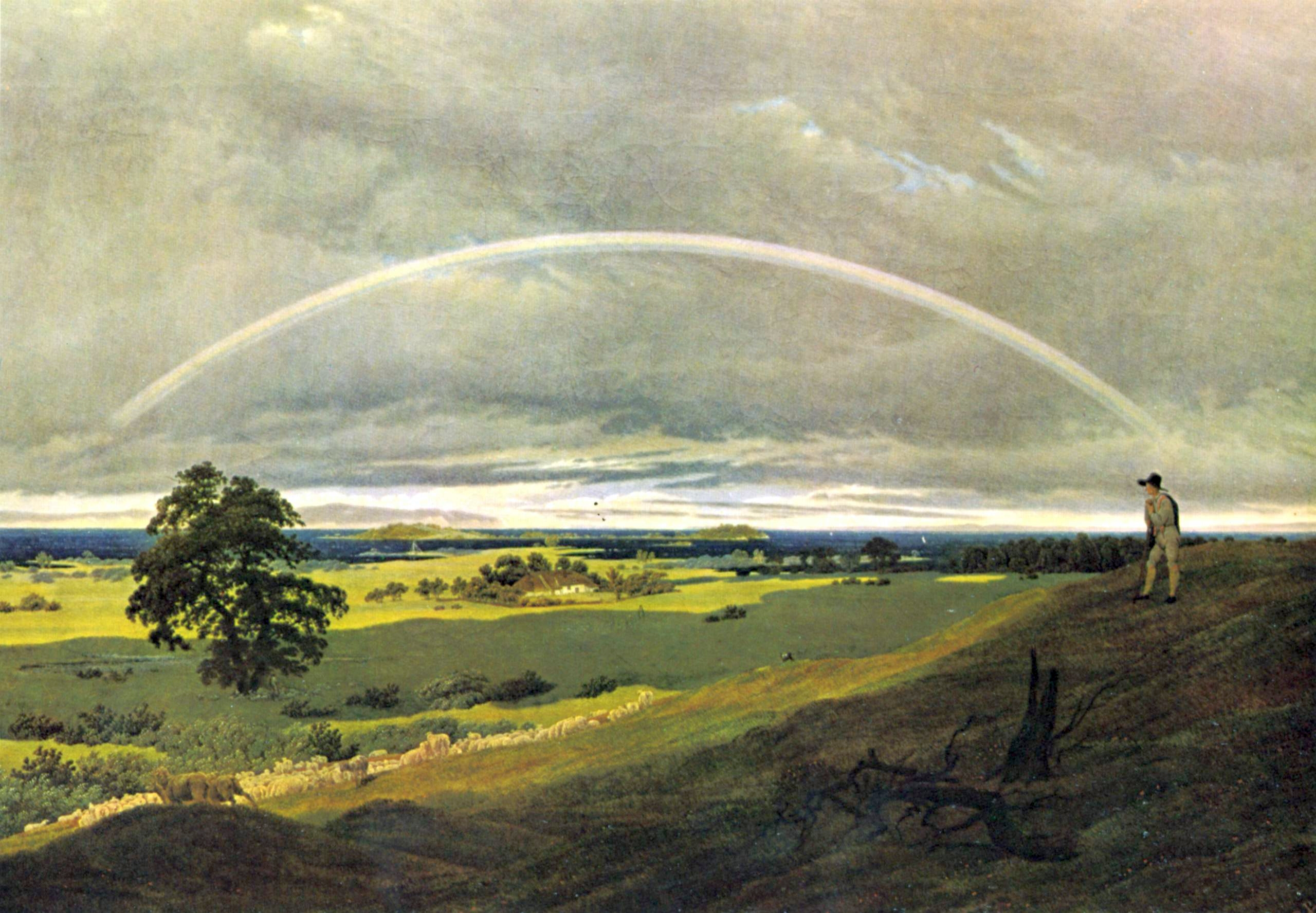
Caspar David Friedrich painting: Rugia Landscape with Rainbow, with Vilm in the background
