= List of castles and palaces in Mecklenburg-Vorpommern =

This list encompasses castles, palaces and stately homes described in German as Burg (castle), Festung (fort/fortress), Schloss (manor house) and Palais/Palast (palace). Many German castles after the Middle Ages were mainly built as royal or ducal palaces rather than as a fortified building.

== Mecklenburg ==
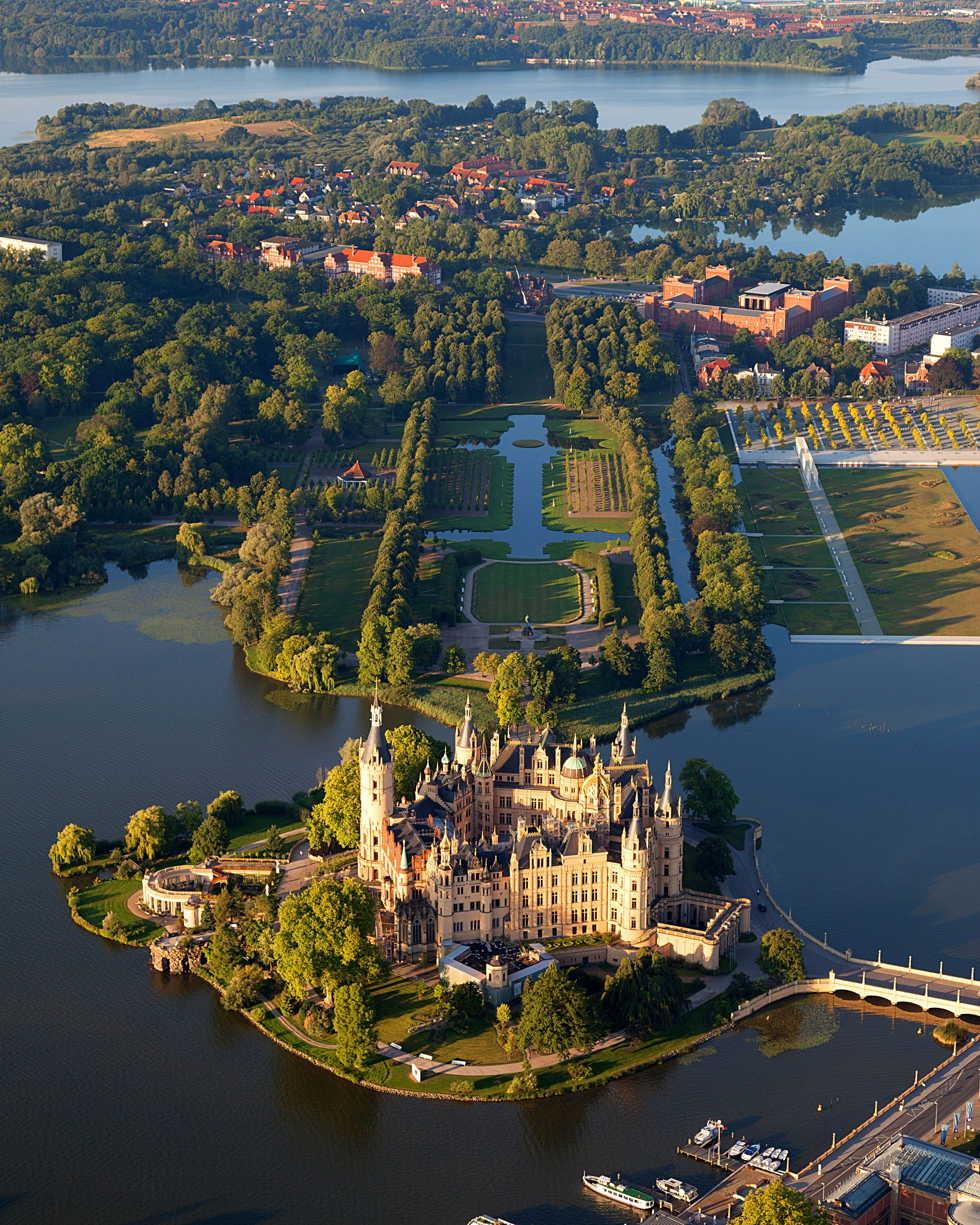
Schwerin Palace

- Schloss Bothmer, near Klütz
- Bülow Hunting Lodge, Bülow
- Dargun Palace (ruins), Dargun
- Festung Dömitz, Dömitz
- Friedrichsmoor Hunting Lodge, Neustadt-Glewe
- Schloss Gadebusch, Gadebusch
- Jagdschloss Gelbensande
- Grubenhagen Castle, Vollrathsruhe
- Güstrow Palace, Güstrow
- Schloss Hohenzieritz, Hohenzieritz
- Schloss Kaarz, Weitendorf
- Schloss Kittendorf, Kittendorf
- Liepser Schlösschen
- Ludwigslust Palace, Ludwigslust
- Schlossinsel Mirow, Mirow
- Alte Burg Neustadt-Glewe, Neustadt-Glewe
- Neues Schloss Neustadt-Glewe, Neustadt-Glewe
- Schloss Neustrelitz (destroyed), Neustrelitz
- Alte Burg Penzlin, Penzlin
- Schloss Neue Burg Penzlin, Penzlin
- Plau Castle, Plau am See
- Festungsanlage Poel, Poel
- Schloss Roggenhagen, near Neubrandenburg
- Schwerin Palace
- Stargard Castle, Burg Stargard
- Schloss/Rittergut Steinbeck (destroyed), Bellin near Güstrow
- Stuer Castle, Stuer
- Schloss Varchentin, Varchentin
- Wesenberg Castle, Wesenberg
- Schloss Wiligrad, Lübstorf
- Wredenhagen Castle, Wredenhagen
- Löcknitz Castle

== Vorpommern ==
- Conerow Castle (ruins), Wodarg
- Haus Demmin (ruins), Demmin
- Schloss Hohendorf
- Schloss Karlsburg, Karlsburg
- Klempenow Castle, Breest
- Landskron Castle (ruins)
- Löcknitz Castle, Lröcknitz
- Müggenburg Water Castle, Neuenkirchen near Anklam
- Osten Castle (ruins)
- Quitzin Hunting Lodge, near Grimmen
- Wasserschloss Quilow, near Anklam
- Schloss Schlemmin, Schlemmin
- Spantekow Fortress, Spantekow
- Schloss Ueckermünde, Ueckermünde
- Schloss Wrodow

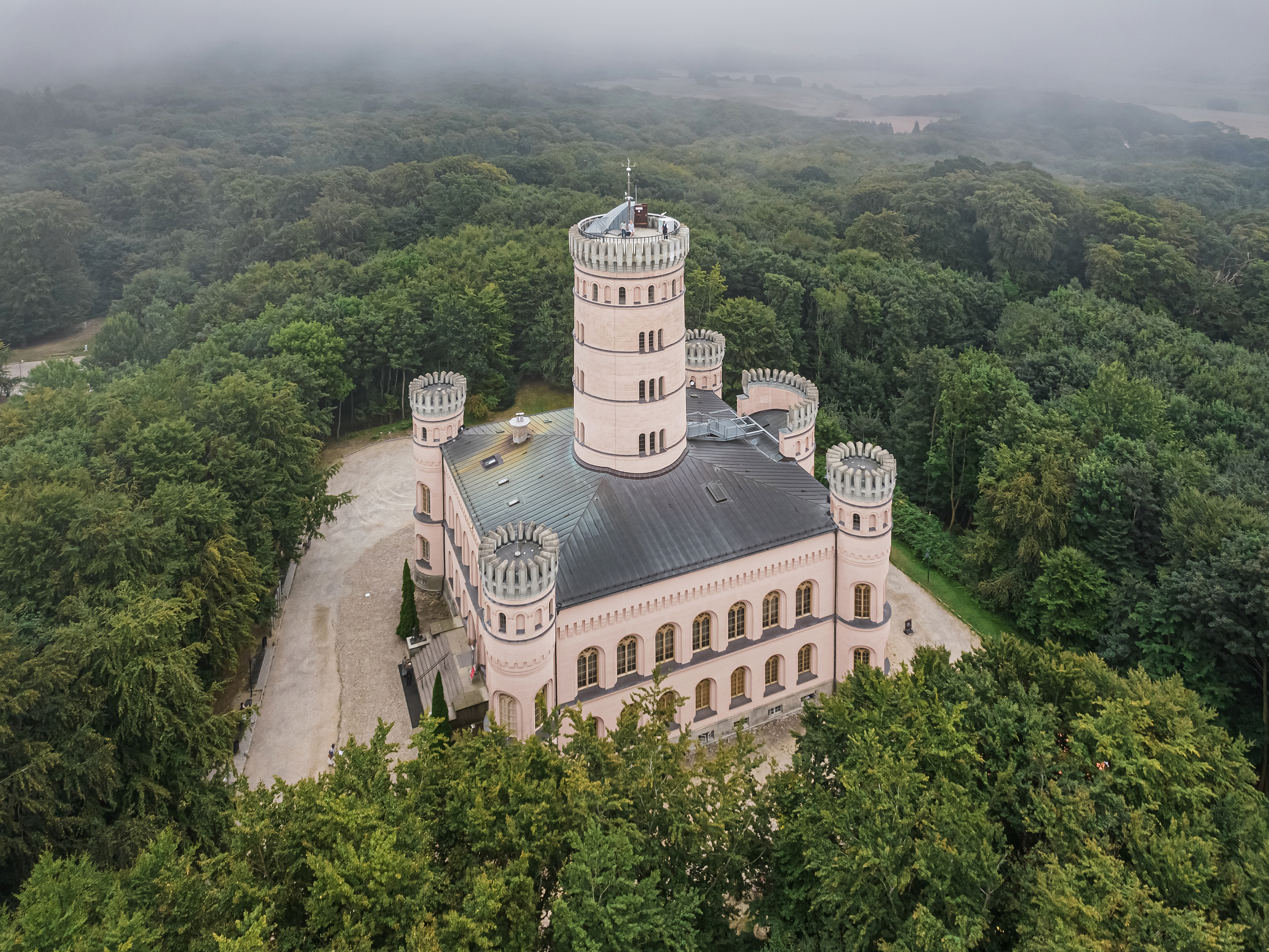
Granitz Hunting Lodge, Rügen Island

=== Isle of Rügen ===
- Jaromarsburg, Kap Arkona
- Granitz Hunting Lodge, near Binz
- Dwasieden Castle (destroyed), Sassnitz
- Putbus Palace (destroyed), Putbus
- Spyker Castle, Glowe

=== Isle of Usedom ===
- Wasserschloss Mellenthin (moated castle), Mellenthin
- Schloss Pudagla
- Schloss Stolpe

== See also ==
- List of castles
- List of castles in Germany
