= Granitz =

Coordinates: 54°23′13.03906″N 13°38′56.90″E

The Granitz (German pronunciation: [ˈɡʁaːnɪts]) is a wooded ridge in the southeast of Germany's largest island, Rügen, between the Baltic Sea resorts of Binz and Sellin. The woods cover an area of 982 hectares and are designated as a nature reserve. Since 1991 they have been part of the Southeast Rügen Biosphere Reserve.

Characteristic of the Granitz are its rich stands of beech and sessile oak and its rolling landscape of push end moraines, which in some ways resemble a mountain landscape. To the north and east the Granitz is bounded by a cliffed coast on the Baltic Sea. In the south it adjoins the Mönchgut region and in the north, the narrow bar of the Schmale Heide. The 23-acre (9.3 ha) Black Lake (Schwarzer See) lies in the Granitz as do several kettle bogs. A number of non-native stands of conifers are being turned into a near-natural forest.

No roads of any description run through the Granitz, but there are many cycle and footpaths. Local transport and access to the area is provided by the Rügen Light Railway and Binz Seaside Railway (Binzer Bäderbahn).

On the highest point, the Tempelberg (107 m above sea level (NN)), Prince Wilhelm Malte I of Putbus had the Granitz hunting lodge constructed in the 19th century. Other landmarks include Granitz House, the grave site of Finnish warriors and the Cross Oak (Kreuzeiche).

The name is probably of Slavic origin and comes from the personal name, Granza, used by the Rani tribe, which first appears as a prince's name in the Saxo Grammaticus in 1168. In 1888, the Waldhalle, a tourist restaurant, was built on the hill of Falkenberg on the clifftop path from Binz to Sellin near the coast. The building had to be abandoned and demolished in the 1980s as a result of coast collapse. Only a few remains of foundations on the cliff face of the Baltic Sea coast recall the existence of the building.

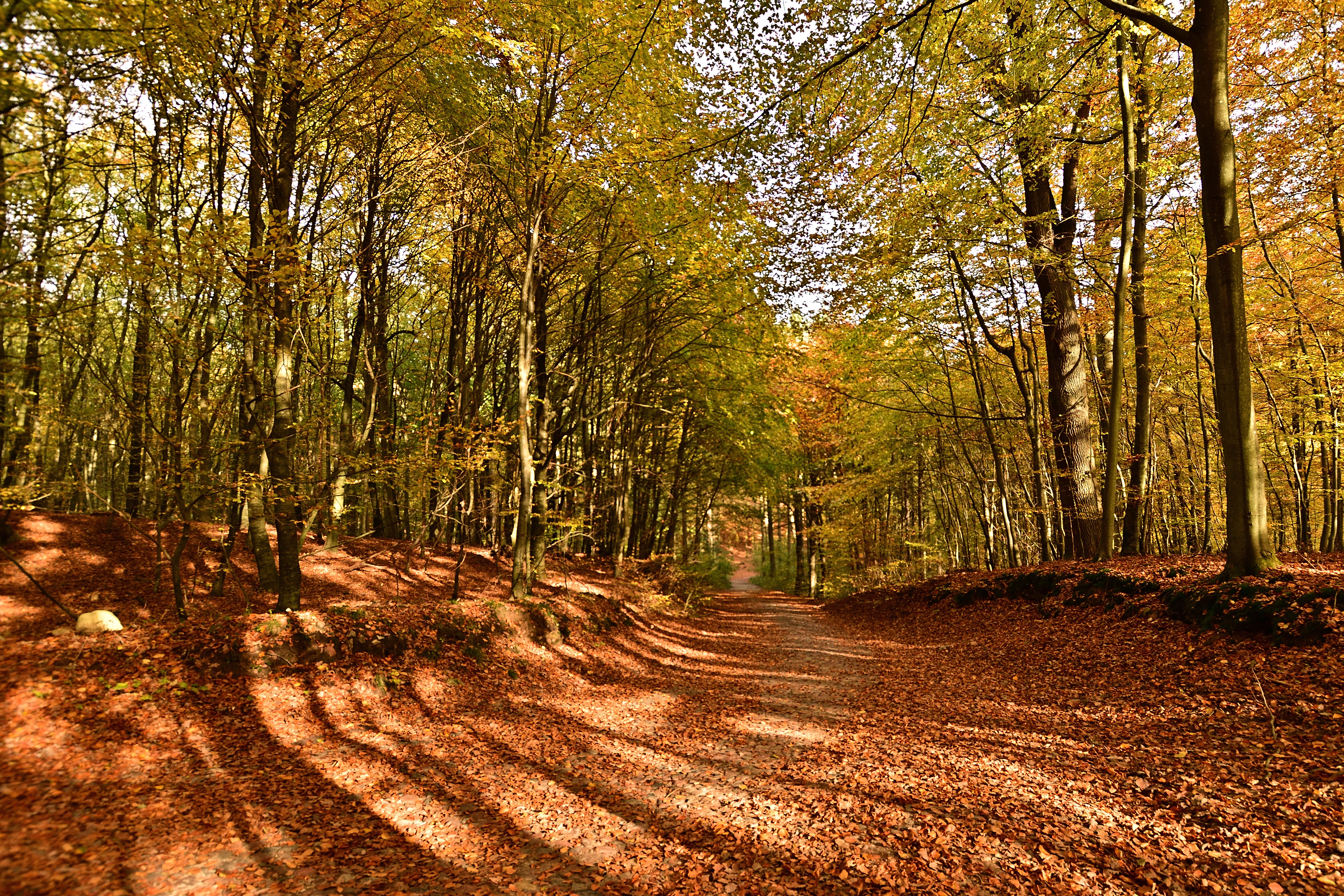
Autumn in the Granitz

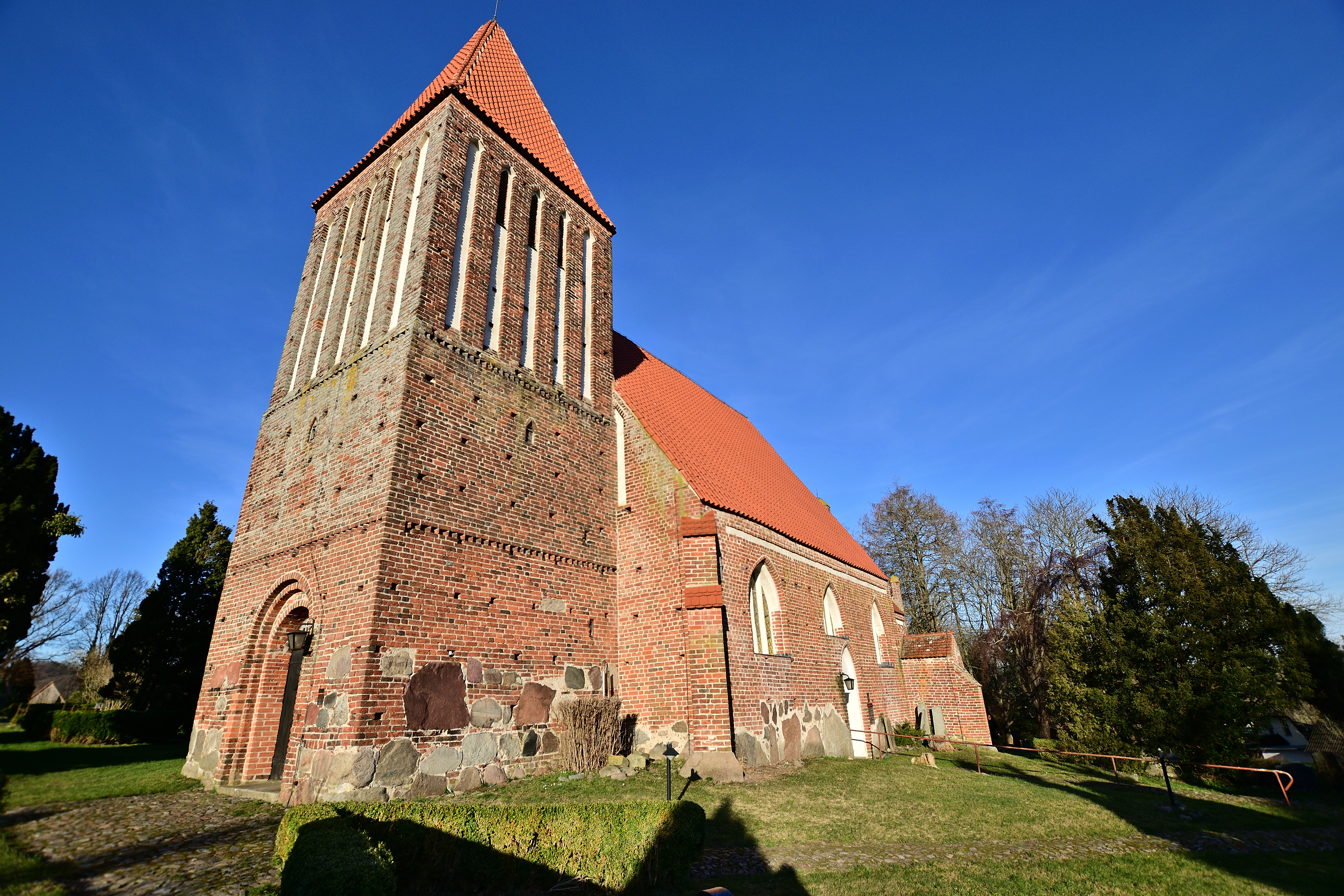
Church of Sankt Andreas in Lancken Granitz

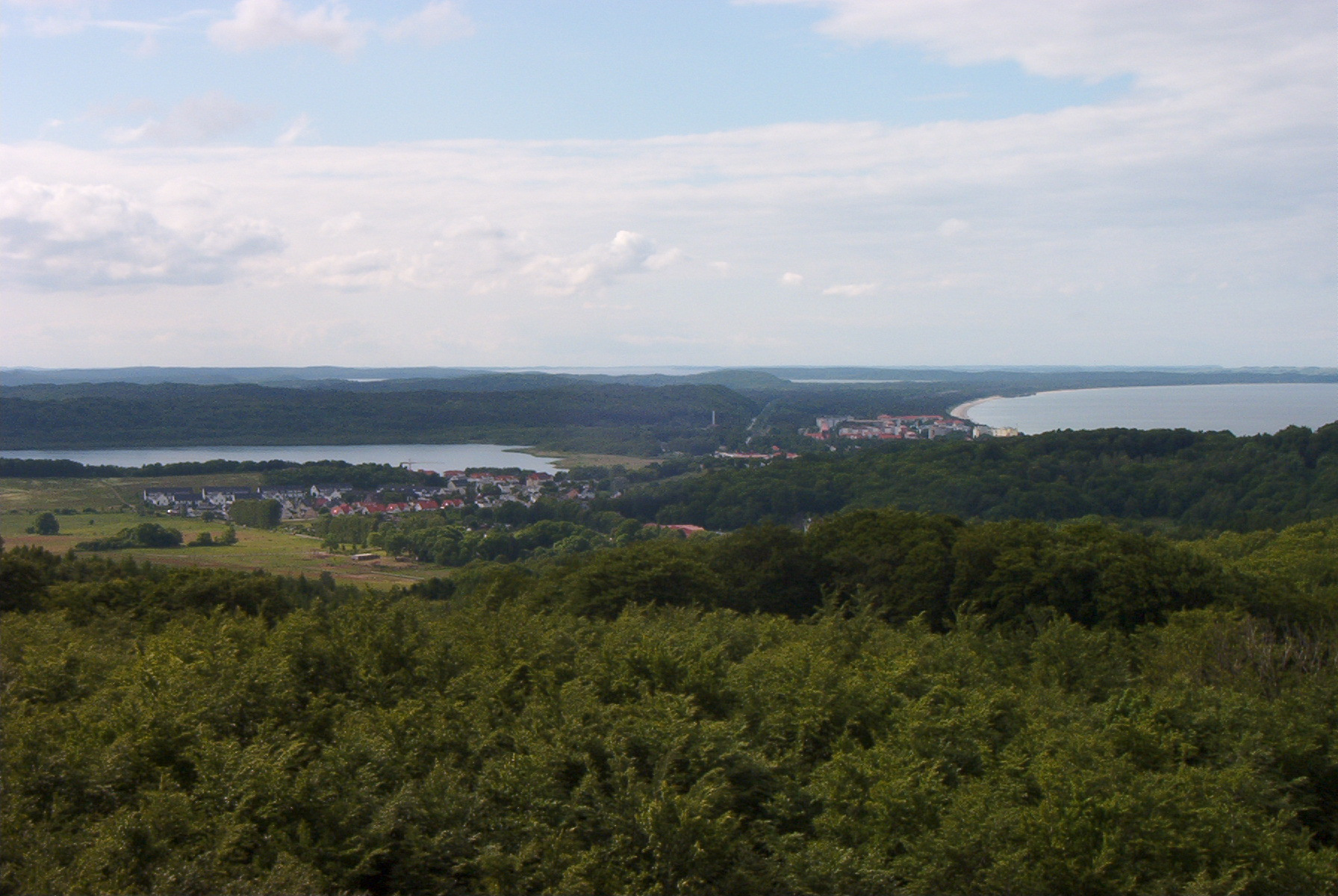
View over the foothills of the Granitz from the hunting lodge (a castle) looking towards Binz, Rügen Island

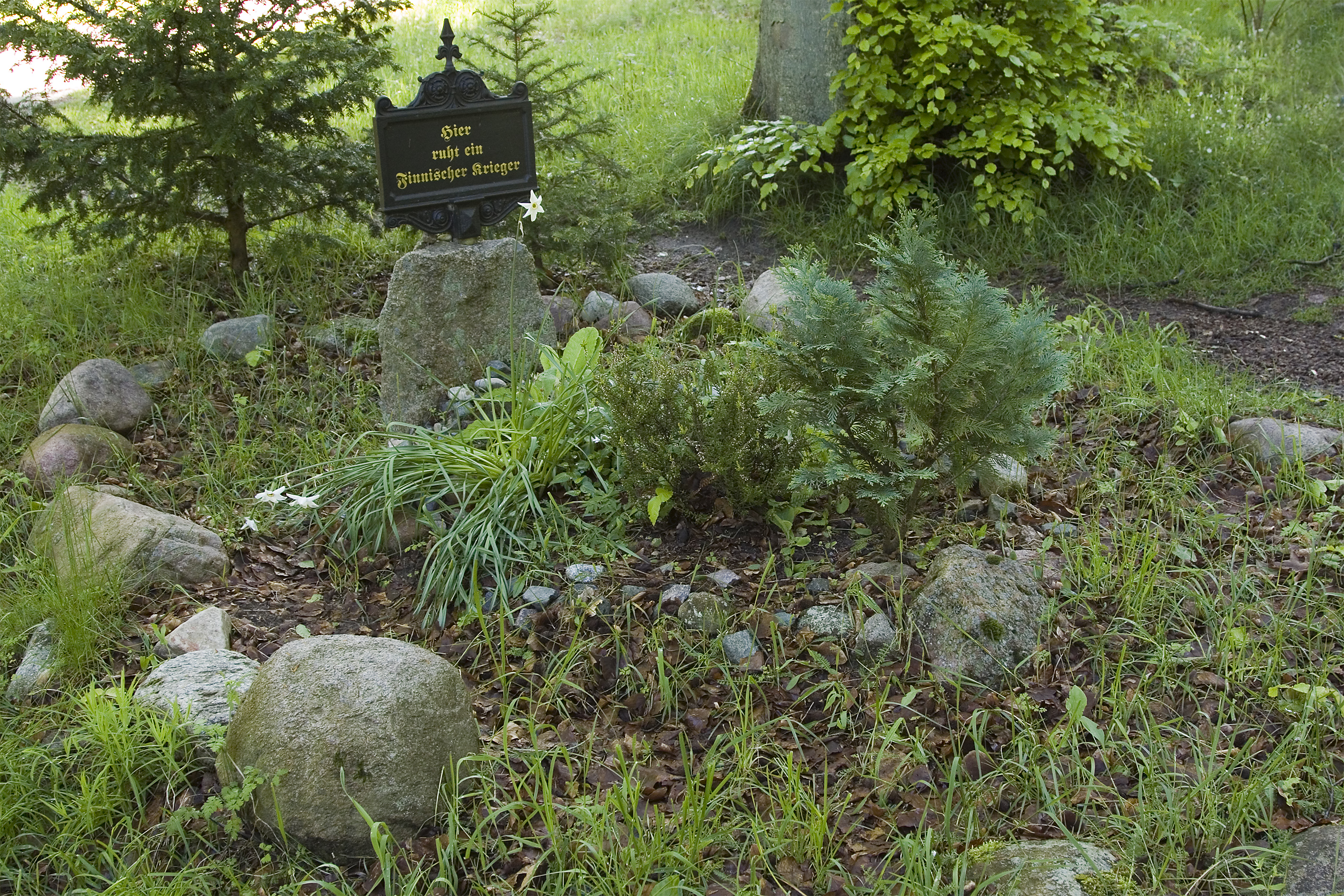
Grave of a Finnish warrior

== See also ==
- Granica
