= Baldone Manor =

Manor house in Baldone. Latvia

- Zemgale, Latvia
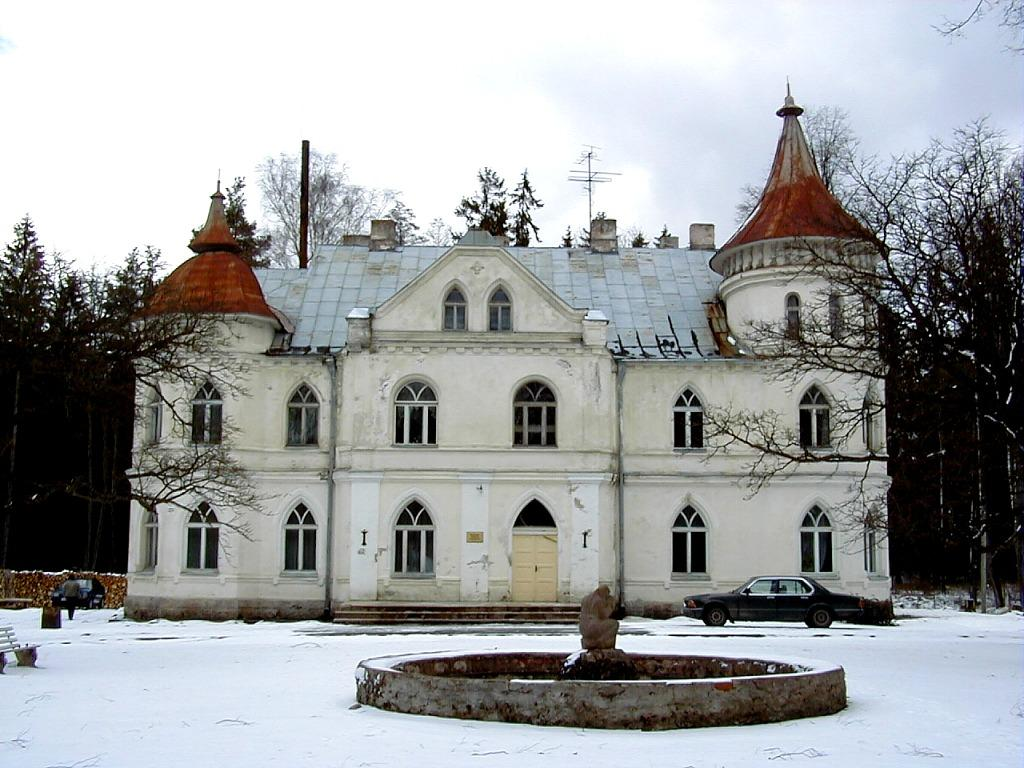

Site information
- Type: Manor

Location
- Coordinates: 56°44′53.0″N 24°24′00.4″E

Baldone Manor, also called White Castle (Latvian: Baltā pils), is a manor house in Baldone, Ķekava Municipality in the Semigallia region of Latvia. It was built in 1901 as a hunting lodge (German: Jagdschloss). At present Baldone Music School is operating in the former hunting lodge.

== History ==
The castle was built near Baldone Forest by Adam V. Mickiewicz (1865-1920), who later became the head of the Baltic Agricultural and State Property Administration. He was married to Elisabeth Buckhaven. Manor house was always painted white, and therefore has its name — White Castle (Latvian: Baltā pils). During the First World War, the castle housed a Russian army hospital until October 1915, and later a German army hospital. After the First World War, the White Castle became one of Baldone's spas, which belonged to the Mickiewicz family, but they did not occupy the entire manor house, and it was also used as children's shelter. Nicholas Mickiewicz who inherited the property, had a son in 1929 Denis Mickiewicz, who emigrated with much of his family to German-occupied Poland at the beginning of World War II, later to the United States, where he became a professor of Russian literature at Duke University. He is the founder of the Yale Russian Chorus at Yale University. In September 1944 the German administration moved the orphanage to Mencendarbe Manor, where a second orphanage was operating at that time. As a result, the premises were vacated and a German army infirmary moved in.

After World War II, building was used by the Baldone Sanatorium, which could accommodate 75 people. It was both a boarding house for girls with tuberculosis and a boarding room in the gynecological department. From 1980 the White Castle was owned by Baldone Hospital. Although the hospital was not built there, the collective farm "Baldone" built a dormitory where the collective farm workers lived.

In 1985, the Baldone School of Music was opened in the building, which became a cultural center where local children learned their first music skills and concert experience. In 1993, Baldone Elementary School of Music was established in parallel. In 2011, school was renamed the Baldone Music School by the name of the famous conductor Baldone County, Janis Dumins. The historical interior of the castle has not survived.

== Manor park ==
Manor park with exotic trees always has been well maintained, it is recorded in the Latvian List of natural resources.

== See also ==
- List of palaces and manor houses in Latvia
