= Granitz Hunting Lodge =

Coordinates: 54°22′50″N 13°37′38″E

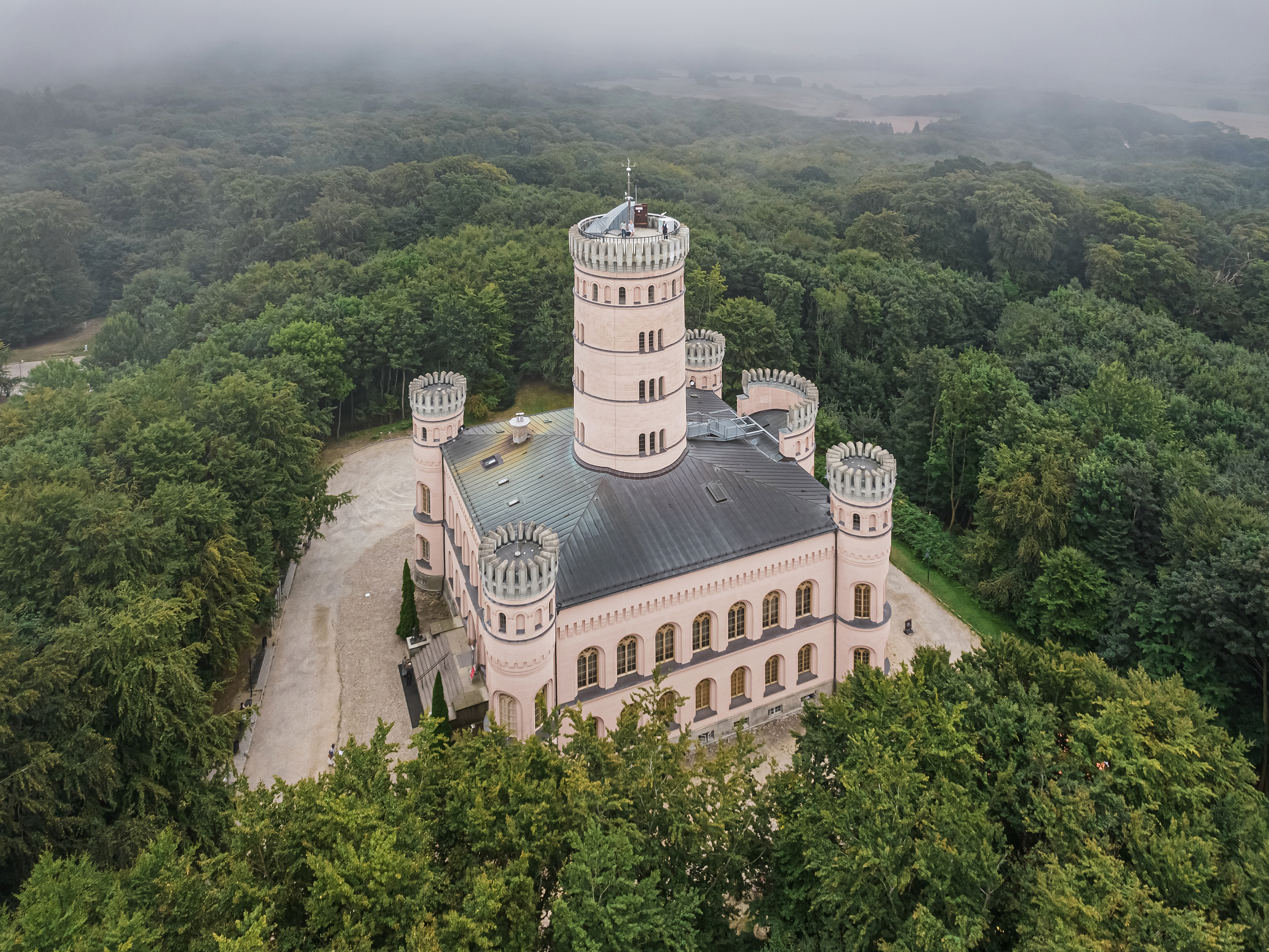
Granitz Hunting Lodge in 2022

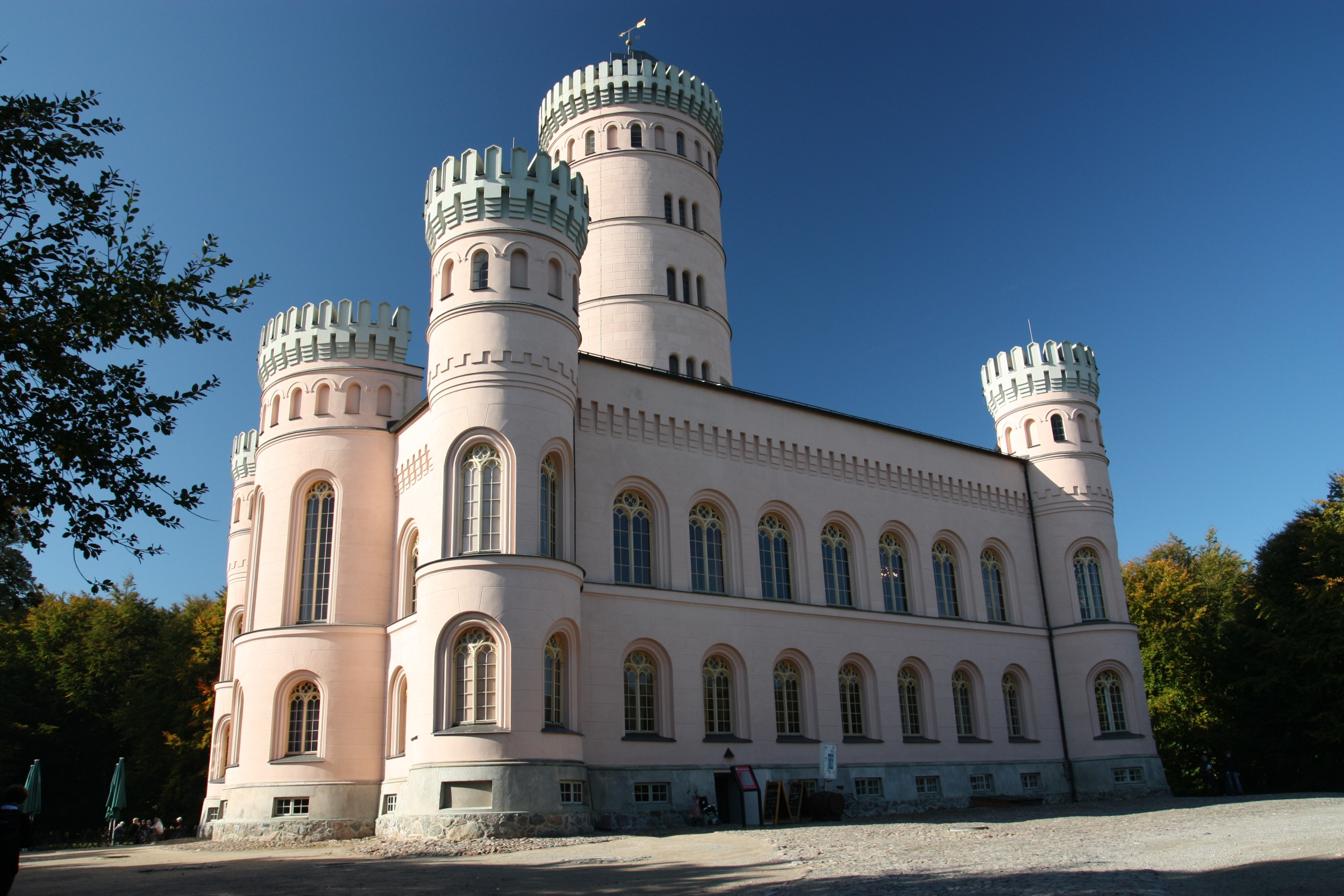
Granitz Hunting Lodge

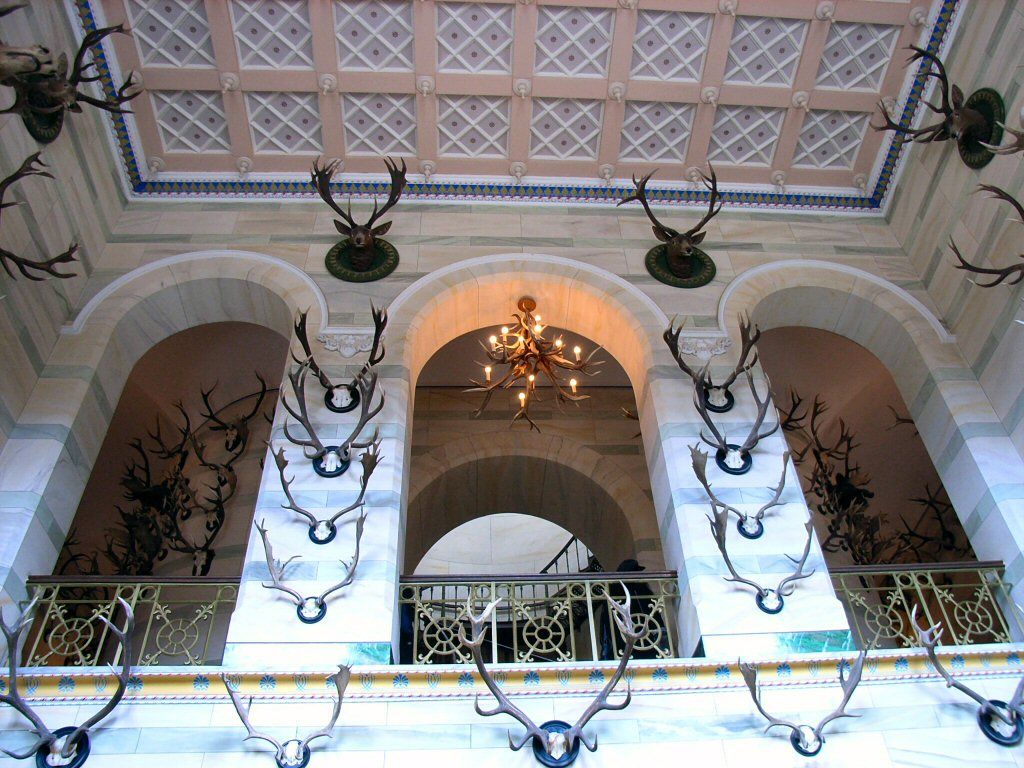
Entrance hall

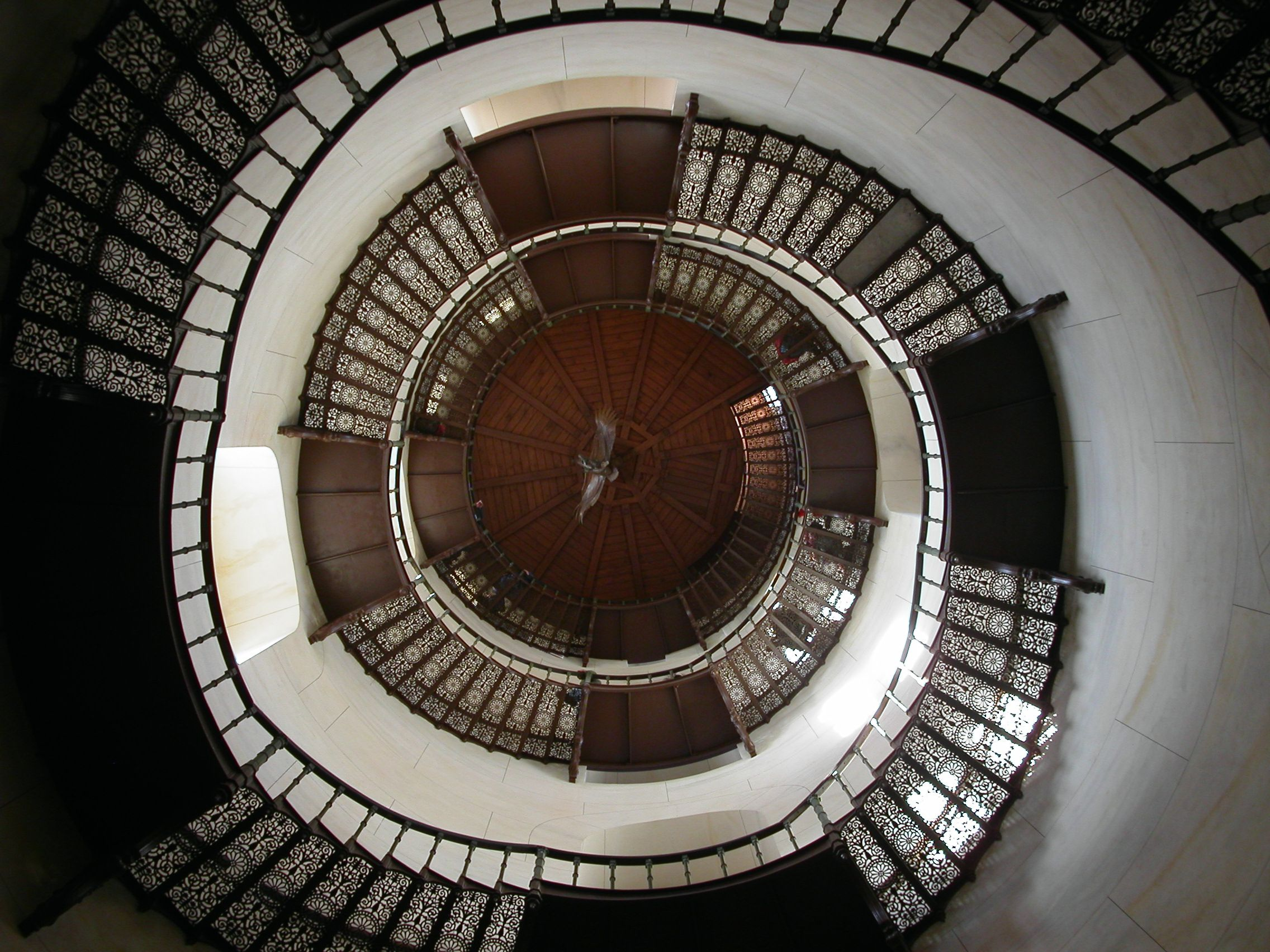
Circular staircase in the central tower

Granitz Hunting Lodge (German: Jagdschloss Granitz) is located on the German island of Rügen in the vicinity of the seaside resort of Binz. With over 200,000 visitors per year it is the most popular castle or schloss in Mecklenburg-Vorpommern.

== Location ==
The lodge lies in the middle of the forested Granitz ridge, which covers an area of about 1,000 hectares (2,500 acres) and has been part of the Southeast Rügen Biosphere Reserve since 1991. The name Tempelberg given to the highest hill in the Granitz comes from the 18th century, when a small hexagonal belvedere stood on the site of the present schloss. The quickest way to get there is from the Baltic seaside resort of Binz on the Rügen Light Railway or the Hunting Lodge Express (Jagdschlossexpress).

== History ==
The hunting lodge (Jagdschloss) was built on the highest hill in East Rügen, the 107 m above sea level (NN) high Tempelberg, in the years 1838 to 1846 by order of Prince Wilhelm Malte I of Putbus, based on a design by Berlin architect, Johann Gottfried Steinmeyer in the style of the North Italian Renaissance castellos. It was once a popular holiday destination for European nobility and prominent people; for example, Frederick William IV, Christian VIII, Otto von Bismarck, Elizabeth von Arnim, and Johann Jacob Grümbke numbered amongst its visitors.

The lodge was owned by the von Putbus family until 1944 and passed into Nazi hands on the imprisonment of Malte von Putbus. The family was finally dispossessed as part of the East German land reforms and the castle remains today in state hands. After the end of the Second World War many of the furnishings were lost or stolen, several works of art were taken to the Berlin Art Depot, the agency for the administration of Soviet assets in Germany, and transferred in 1953 to the state museums in Berlin.

Attempts by the grandson of Malte zu Putbus, Franz zu Putbus, to get the family seat returned failed in court. The building is used today as a museum.

The castle was renovated at the beginning of the 21st century at a cost of 7.9 million euros.

== Design ==
The two-story, plastered, brick edifice has a rectangular ground plan and four small corner towers. In the centre of the building in the old courtroom there is a 38-metre-high central tower, erected later based on plans by Karl Friedrich Schinkel. Inside is a cantilevered circular staircase with 154 cast-iron steps. The static forces of the heavy iron staircase are entirely absorbed by the side walls; because it virtually clamped to the tower.

From the observation platform, 145 metres above sea level (NN), on the roof of the tower, there is a panoramic view in all directions, especially over the south and east of Rügen. In clear visibility the island of Usedom may be seen.

== Exhibitions ==
Old hunting rifles are displayed in the "Stags of the World" (Hirsche der Welt) exhibition as well as furniture from the 19th century. In addition there are temporary exhibitions, for example of paintings. Under the direction of experts from the Pomeranian State Museum at Greifswald a permanent exhibition about Prince Malte I zu Putbus and his castle-building project has been created.

== See also ==
- List of castles in Mecklenburg-Vorpommern

== Literature ==
- Peter Feist (1995), Jagdschloss Granitz (in German), Berlin: Kai Homilius Verlag, ISBN 3-931121-05-4
- Andreas Vogel (2003), Johann Gottfried Steinmeyer und Putbus (in German), Schwerin: Thomas Helms Verlag, ISBN 978-3-931185-82-4
- Heike Kramer (2010), Jagdschloss Granitz (in German), Schwerin: Thomas Helms Verlag, ISBN 978-3-940207-68-5
