= Mencendarbe Manor =

Manor house in Latvia

Mercendarbe Manor
- Semigallia, Latvia
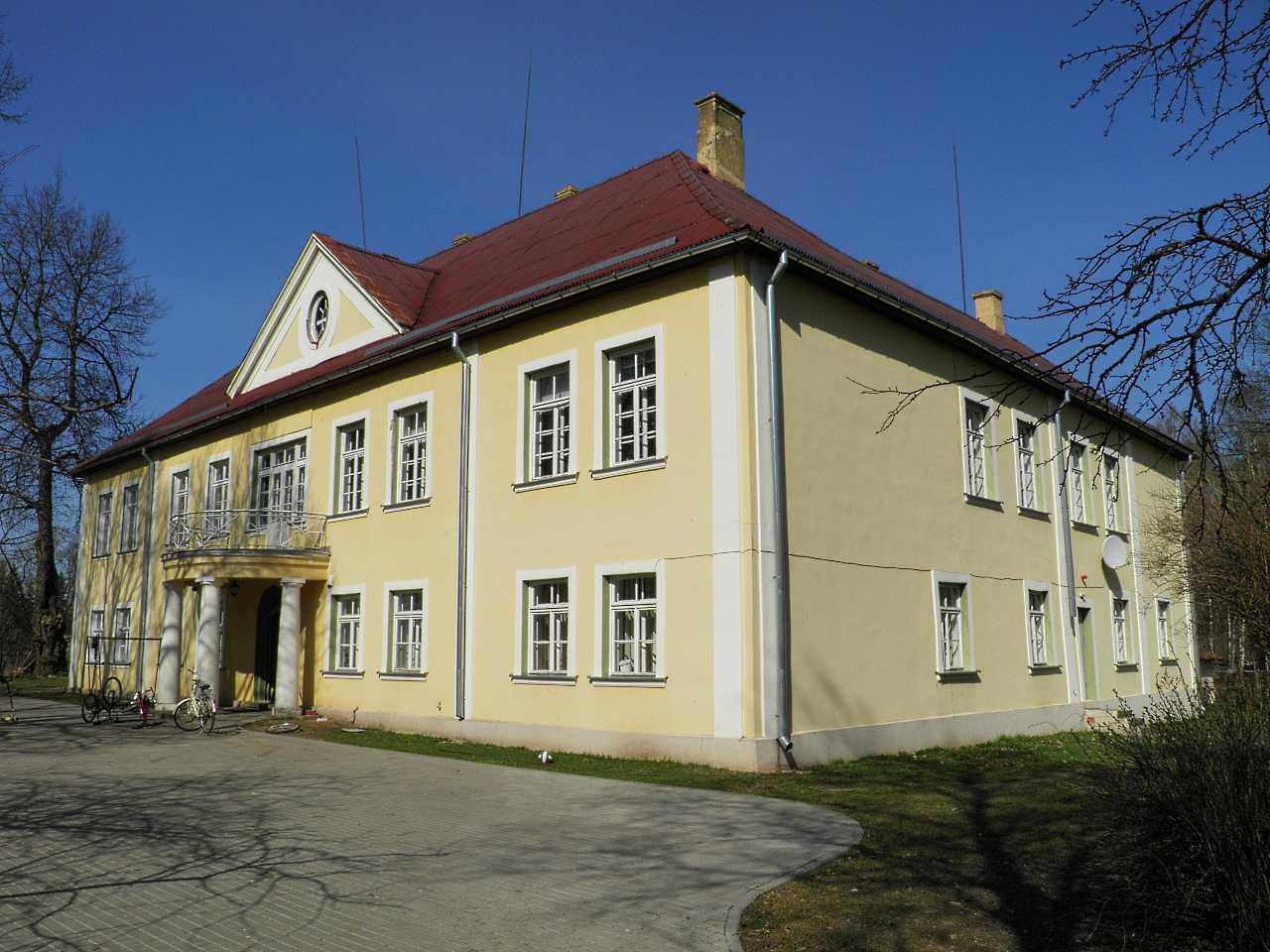

Site information
- Type: Manor

Location
- Coordinates: 56°45′56.3″N 24°25′52.2″E

Mercendarbe Manor, also called Mercendorf Manor and Mercendarbe Manor (German: Gut Märzendorf) is a manor house in the Baldone Parish of Ķekava Municipality, in the Semigallia region of Latvia.

== History ==
Originally estate was owned by Peter von Biron (1724–1800), the last Duke of Courland. On 11 August 1786, along with the associated land estates and lakes, manor was sold to Baron Friedrich Georg von Lieven (1748–1800) for 31,000 thalers. Baron von Lieven liked to use the castle as summer residence and hunting lodge, for example for duck hunting. After his death, his son Karl Georg von Lieven managed the estate. In 1905 Freiherr Alexander von Lieven was named as the owner. The last owner was Carlos von Lieven (1879–1971). Until World War I, the estate remained in the possession of the Lieven family.

From 1920 to 1939, the owners of the manor changed regularly. In 1939 a children's home was opened on the estate, it was only closed in 2012. Currently, the mansion is home for Museum of Baldone.

== See also ==
- List of palaces and manor houses in Latvia
