= City Palace =

City Palace may refer to:

- City Palace, Berlin, Germany
- City Palace, Brunswick, Germany
- City Palace, Potsdam, Germany
- Wiesbaden City Palace, Germany
- Schloss Weimar, Germany
- City Palace, Jaipur, India
- City Palace, Udaipur, India
- Mysore Palace or City Palace, a palace in Mysore, India

== See also ==
- Residenz
- Stadtschloss (disambiguation)
