= Schloss =

Type of stately home found in German-speaking regions

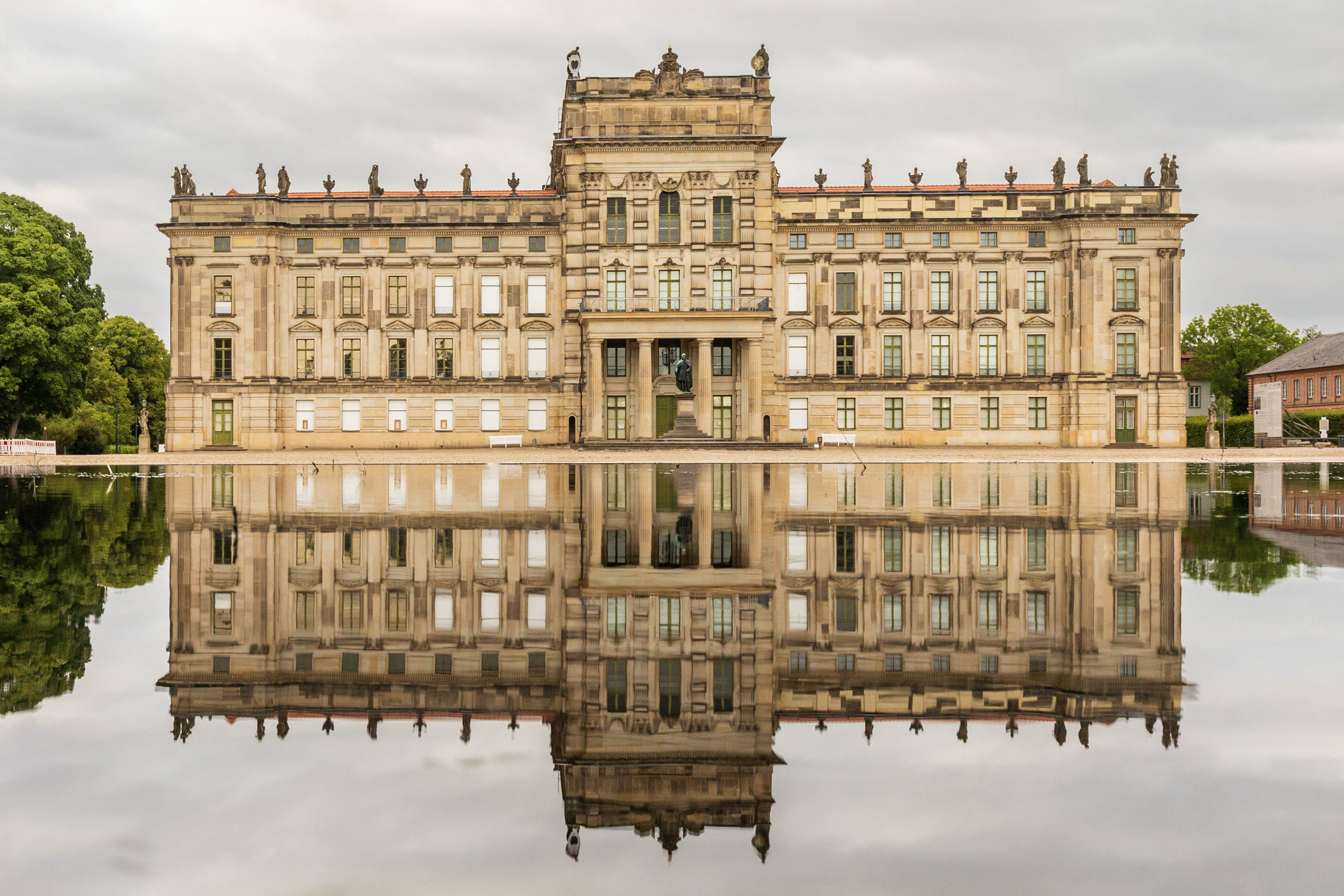
Schloss Ludwigslust in Germany

Schloss (German pronunciation: [ˈʃlɔs]; pl. Schlösser [ˈʃlœsɐ]), formerly written Schloß, is the German term for a building similar to a château, palace, or manor house.

Related terms appear in several Germanic languages. In the Scandinavian languages, the cognate word slot/slott is normally used for what in English could be either a palace or a castle (instead of words in rarer use such as palats/palæ, kastell, or borg). In Dutch, the word slot is considered to be more archaic. Nowadays, one commonly uses paleis or kasteel. But in English, the term does not appear; for instance, in the United Kingdom, this type of structure would be known as a stately home or country house.

Most Schlösser were built after the Middle Ages as residences for the nobility, not as true fortresses, although originally, they often were fortified. The usual German term for a true castle is Burg, while that for a fortress is Festung (sometimes also Veste or Feste), and typically either Palast or Burg for a palace. However, the term Schloss is still used for many castles, especially those that were adapted as residences after they lost their defensive significance. Many adaptations took into account new tastes arising during the Renaissance and Baroque periods.

Like a castle, a Schloss may be surrounded by a moat; it is then called a Wasserschloss (water castle). Other related structure types include the Stadtschloss (a city palace), the Jagdschloss (a hunting lodge), and the Lustschloss (a pleasure palace or summer residence).

== Examples of Schlösser ==
Although they appeared much earlier than the period defined by this term, medieval Carolingian Kaiserpfalzen structures are sometimes considered as being Schlösser in nature. Among those that would qualify are the Palace of Aachen and the Imperial Palace of Goslar.

Gothic

- Schloss Albrechtsburg in Meißen, considered to be Germany's oldest Schloss
- Schloss Allner
- Schloss Blutenburg in Munich, a "castle" in English, but a Schloss in German

Renaissance

- Schloss Glücksburg
- Schloss Güstrow
- Schloss Johannisburg
- Schloss Mespelbrunn
- Schloss Neuburg

Baroque

- Schloss Belvedere in Vienna
- Schloss Esterhazy in Eisenstadt
- Schloss Hellbrunn in Salzburg
- Schloss Ludwigsburg
- Schloss Ludwigslust
- Schloss Mirabell in Salzburg
- Schloss Moritzburg
- Schloss Münster
- Schloss Nymphenburg in Munich
- Schloss Pillnitz
- Stadtschloss Potsdam
- Schloss Rastatt
- Schloss Sanssouci
- Schloss Schleißheim in Oberschleißheim, a northern suburb of Munich
- Schloss Schönbrunn in Vienna
- Schloss Schwetzingen

Neo-Baroque

- Schloss Linderhof
- Schloss Herrenchiemsee

Neoclassicism

- Schloss Charlottenhof
- Schloss Glienicke
- Schloss Weimar
- Schloss Wilhelmshöhe
- Schloss Bellevue

Historicism

- Schloss Babelsberg
- Schloss Callenberg
- Schloss Drachenburg
- Schloss Granitz
- Schloss Marienburg
- Orangerieschloss Potsdam
- Schloss Schwerin
- Schloss Stolzenfels
- Burg Hohenzollern, a "castle" both in English and German, when really a fully-flung Schloss
- Schloss Ringberg in Kreuth, Bavaria

Cross overs

(Relating to places in use for long periods of times, having been extended and perhaps having had renovations in different styles than those of their respective eras – and therefore, displaying at least two and often, multiple styles)

- Stadtschloss Berlin
- Münchner Residenz
- Stadtschloss Darmstadt
- Schloss Weilburg

== Note ==
In another context, Schloss is also the German word for a lock.

== See also ==
- Burg (disambiguation)
- Festung
- Residenz
