= Marshal's Cabin =

Museum and restaurant in Loppi, Finland

Coordinates: 60°43′02″N 24°12′47″E

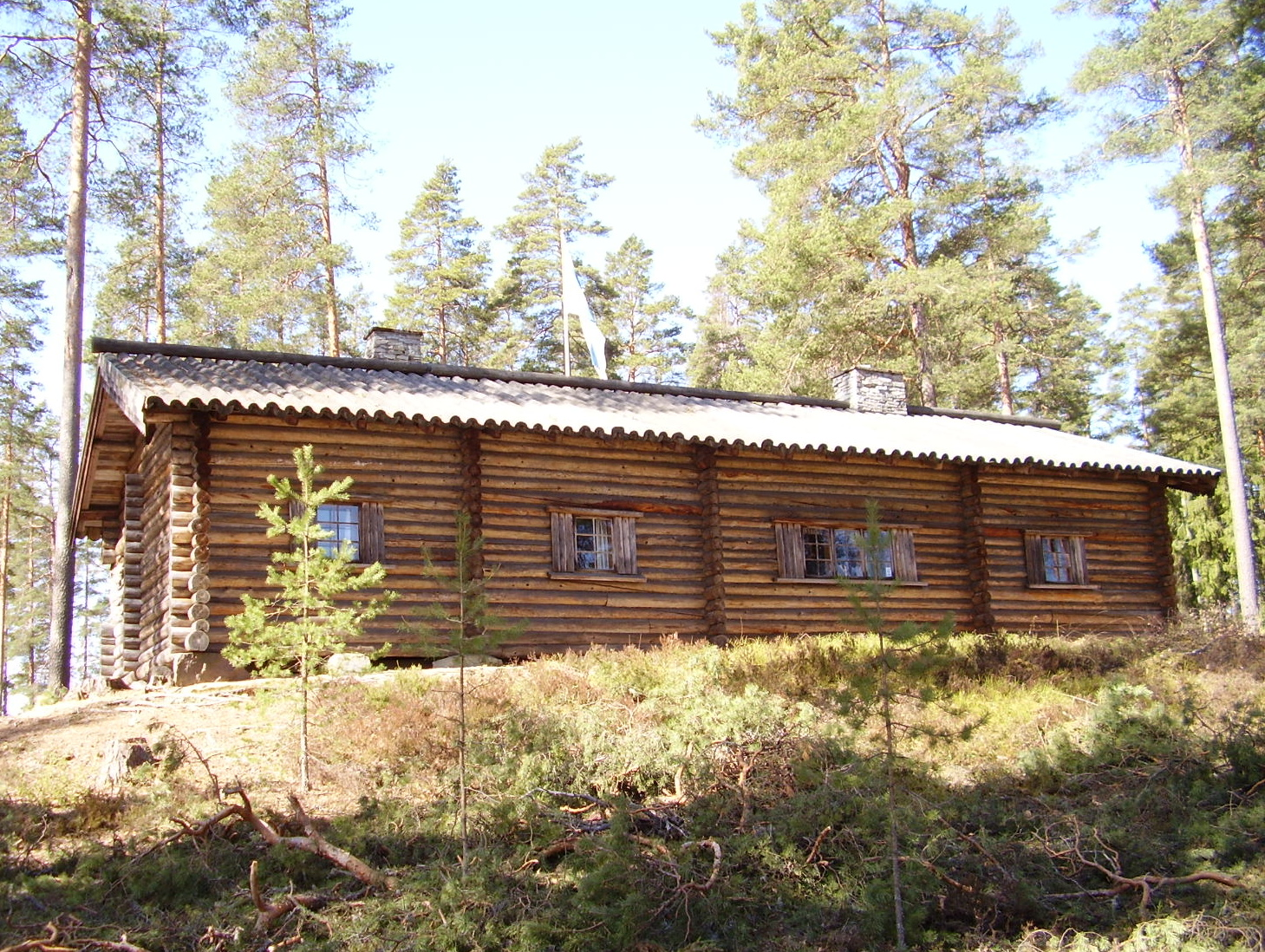
Mannerheim's hunting cabin

The Marshal's Cabin (or Marski's Lodge; Finnish: Marskin Maja) is a current museum and restaurant at the shores of Lake Punelia in Loppi, Finland, near the Räyskälä village. Originally, the cabin with its courtyards was built as a 14th division birthday present for Marshal C. G. E. Mannerheim in 1942 and was originally located in Rugozero, East Karelia. It also includes a log-built summer house, a banqueting hall and a sauna.

== History ==
The Marshal's Cabin was built during the Continuation War in 1942 and was originally a gift from the soldiers of the 14th Division, commanded by Major General Erkki Raappana, to Marshal Mannerheim, the 75-year-old Commander-in-Chief of the Finnish Defence Forces. The original location was on the shores of Lake Leksozero in Keihäsniemi in Rugozero in Finnish-occupied East Karelia. The house was designed by an architect, Lieutenant Eino Pitkänen. Pitkänen also designed the interior of the cabin, with the exception of textiles. The house was handed over to Mannerheim on June 5, 1942, with a gift certificate.

At the end of the Continuation War, the cabin was demolished and a new place was sought for it on the west side of the future state border. The original builders of the cabin re-erected the building on the shores of Lake Punelia in Loppi during May and June 1945. Mannerheim first arrived at the cabin on June 21, 1945, when Major General Raappana solemnly handed over the keys to the cabin to its owner. Due to his duties as President of the Republic and his deteriorating health, the Marshal reportedly visited the inn at its new location only eight times, the last time in September 1948.

In 1948, Mannerheim donated the cabin that had become redundant to the Finnish Hunters' Association, which, however, had no use for it. Ironically, despite the name of the place as a hunting lodge, Mannerheim never used the place for hunting. Eventually, four officers' organizations co-founded an association called "Marshal Mannerheim's Hunting Lodge Association", which acquired the cabin with its estates and renovated it into a museum. The Marshal's Cabin has been open to the public during the summer since 1959. The cabin has an open porch, a large living room with fireplaces, a kitchen, a Marshal's bedroom and rooms for adjutants and missionaries. The cabin originally had a peat roof, which was later replaced by the current firewood roof.

== See also ==
- Mannerheim Museum

== Sources ==
- Tauno Oksanen, Jukka Partanen & Pasi Tuunainen (2009). Mannerheim Rukajärvellä (in Finnish). Helsinki: Gummerus. ISBN 978-951-20-7938-4.
