= Schwarzer See (Granitz) =

Lake in Mecklenburg-Vorpommern, Germany

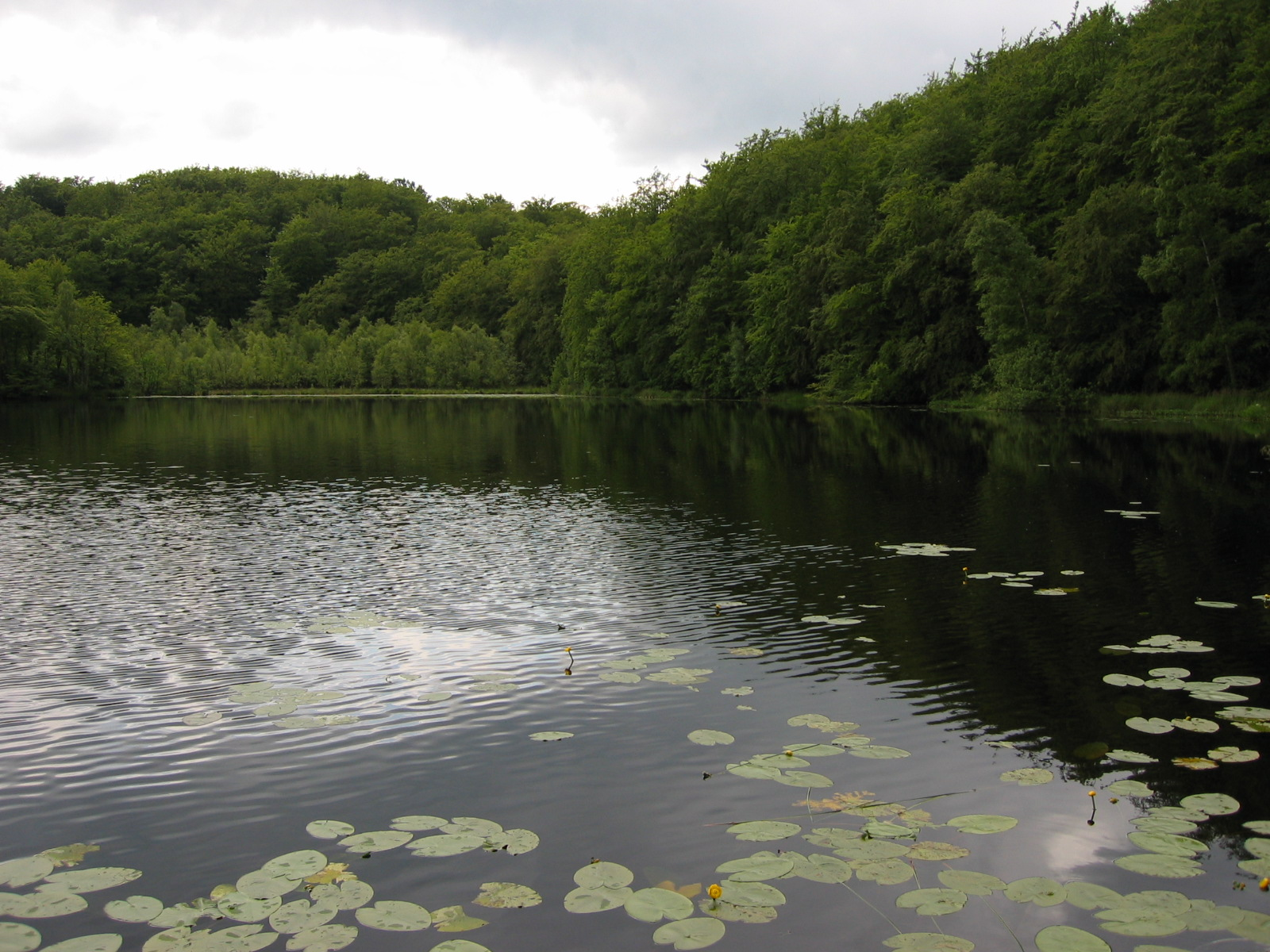
- Schwarzer See

- Location within Mecklenburg-Vorpommern
- Location: Mecklenburg-Vorpommern, Germany
- Coordinates: 54°23′37″N 13°40′14″E
- Surface area: 23 ha (57 acres)
- Max. depth: 15 m (49 ft)
- Surface elevation: 54.2 m (178 ft)

The Schwarzer See is a lake on the German Baltic Sea island of Rügen. It belongs to the municipality of Sellin and is located in the Granitz Forest.

The lake has an area of 23 hectares, a greatest depth of 15 metres and the elevation of its water surface above sea level is 54.2 m above sea level (NHN). The lake, which is poor in nutrients, is one of the very rare types of waterbody, a so-called kettle lake (Kesselsee).

Around the shores the formation of transitional bogs and raised bogs is taking place. It places there is a quagmire vegetation. Here, peat moss, cottongrasses, bog-bean, cranberries and bog rosemary occur.

The entire lake, the bogs around its shores and a 100-metre-wide strip of the wood surrounding the lake are designated as a core zone of the Southeast Rügen Biosphere Reserve. That said, the lake is accessible to hikers and cyclists along the path from Binz to Sellin. The lake itself can be reached on a small wooden jetty.
