= Quitzin Hunting Lodge =

Hunting lodge in Splietsdorf, Germany

Quitzin Castle
- Jagdschloss Quitzin
- Splietsdorf, Mecklenburg-Vorpommern
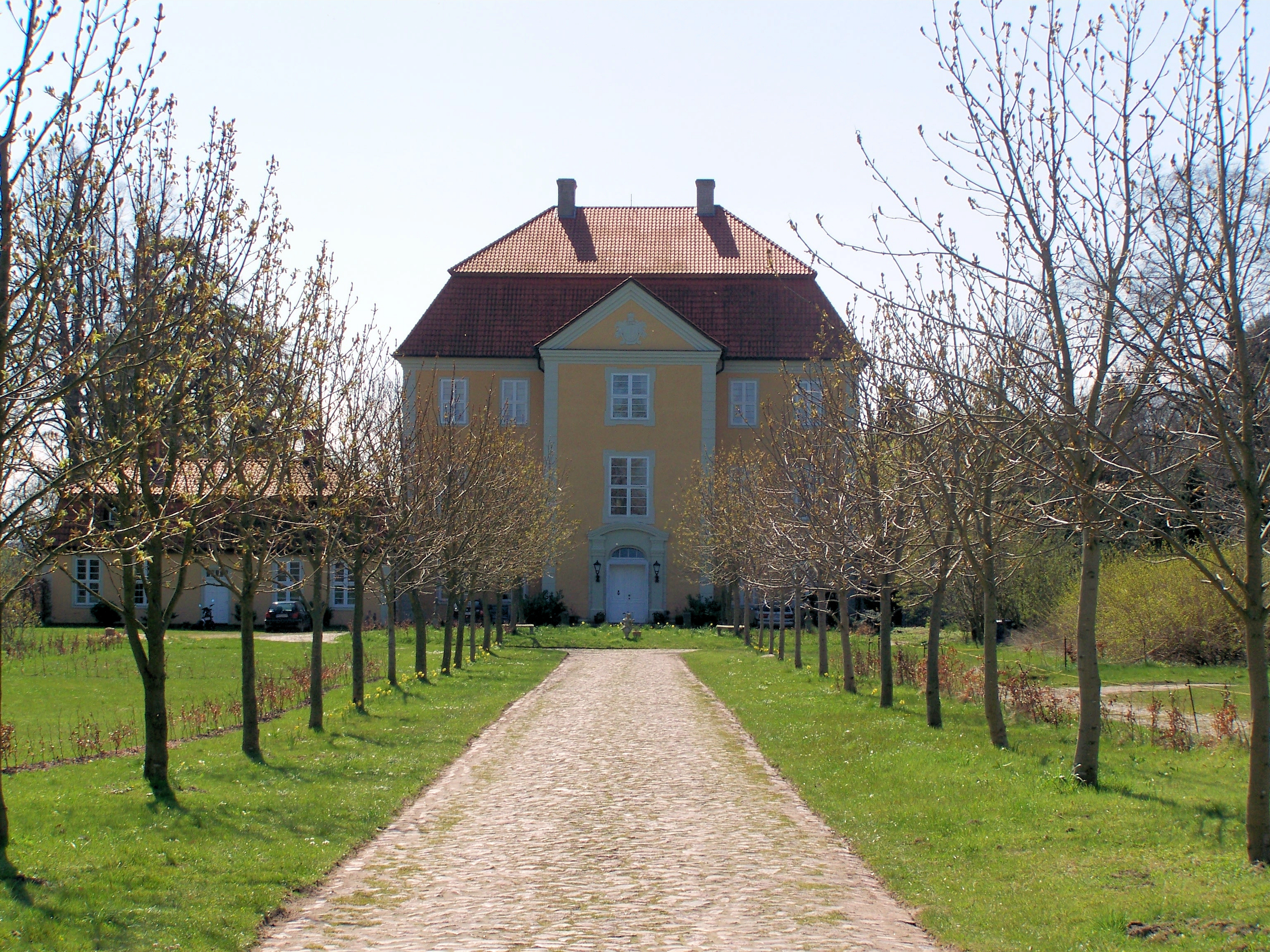
- Quitzin Castle

Site information
- Type: Jagdschloss

Location
- Coordinates: 54.114722°N 12.971389°E

Quitzin Castle (German: Jagdschloss Quitzin) is a Jagdschloss in Splietsdorf municipality, Germany.

== History ==
The presently visible so-called Jagdschloss or "hunting castle" is built on the foundations of a castle from the 13th century. In 1607, a Renaissance manor replaced the old fortress, and during the 18th century, it was transformed into the presently visible Baroque edifice. The estate has been in the possession of several German aristocratic families, among them the counts von Küssow. The last owner of the estate before World War II, Burghard von Veltheim Schönfließ, was an active member of the Widerstand or resistance to Nazism. After World War II, he was not allowed by the East German authorities to keep his estate. It was converted first into a refugee camp, and was later used by the East German civil defence. They rebuilt, neglected and also deliberately destroyed much of the building. Following the German reunification, the castle was handed back to the family of the last owners before the war. It has since been restored and renovated.

The castle lies in an English landscape garden which was preceded by a formal Baroque garden.
