= Jagdschloss =

Building set in a wildlife park or a hunting area

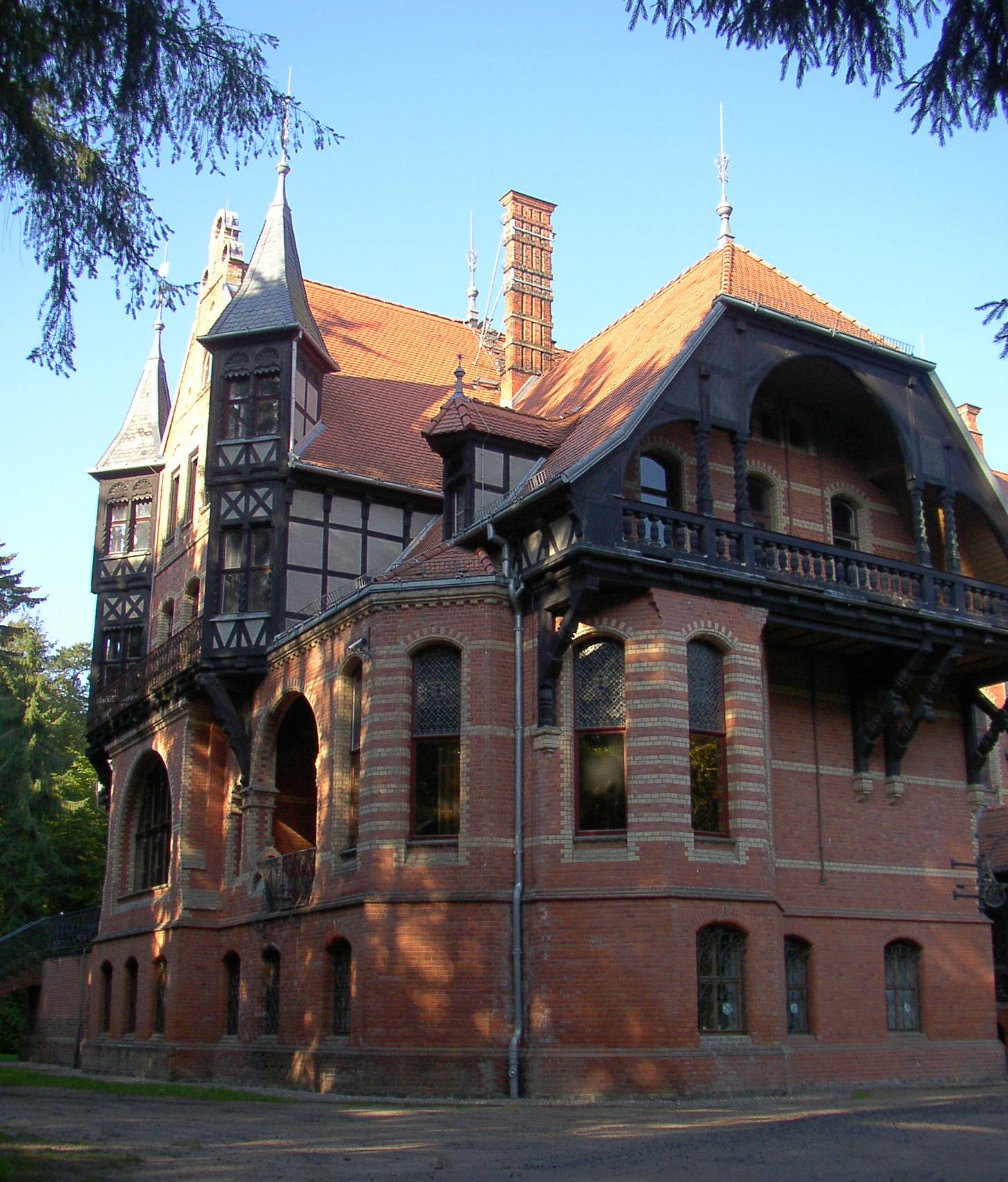
Jagdschloss Gelbensande

A Jagdschloss (German pronunciation: [ˈjaːktˌʃlɔs]) is a hunting lodge in German-speaking countries. It is a schloss set in a wildlife park or a hunting area (such as a forest, field or by a lake) that served primarily as accommodation for a ruler or aristocrat and his entourage while hunting in the area.

== Characteristics ==
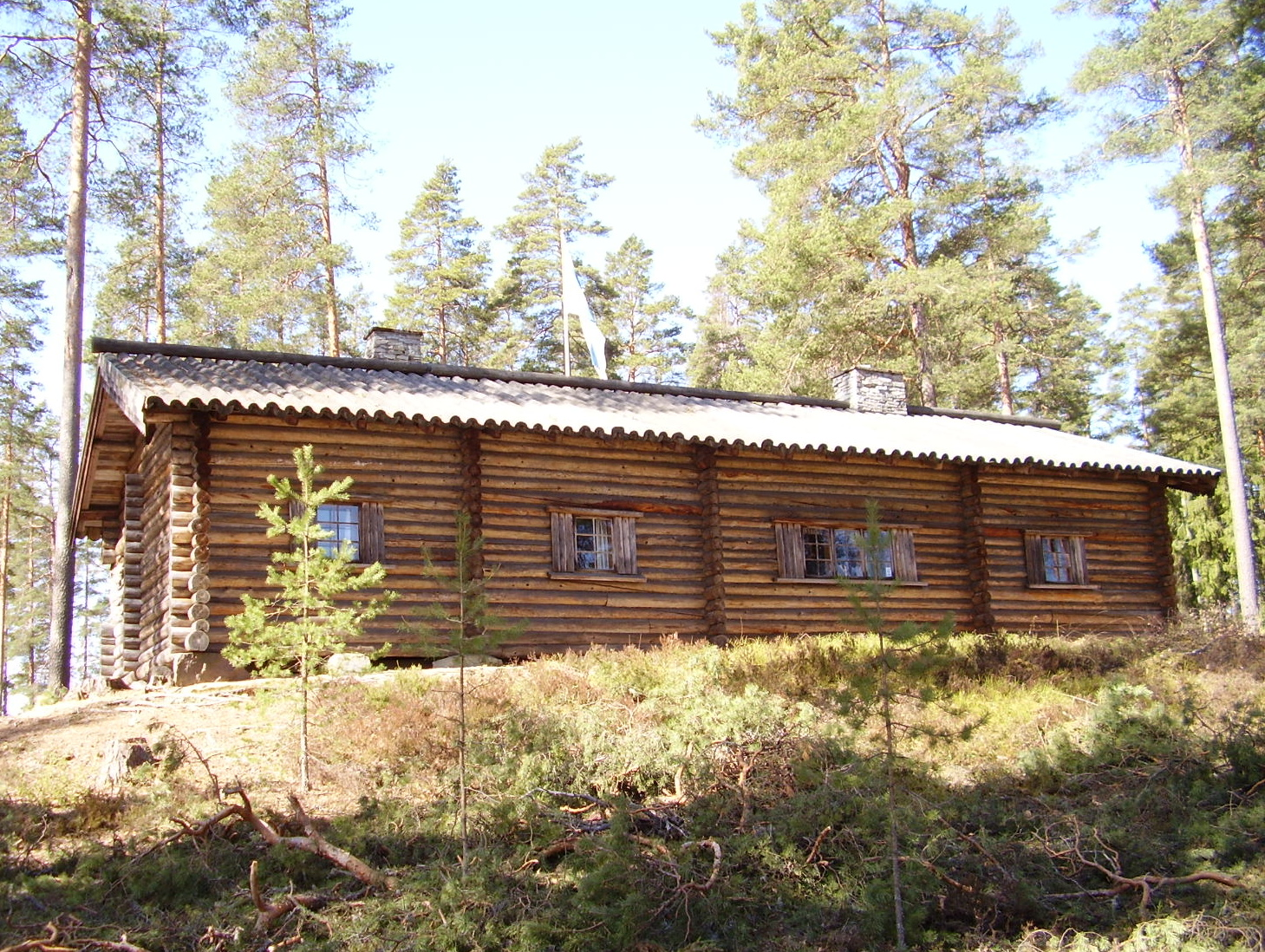
The Marshal's Cabin, a Jagdschloss of Marshal Mannerheim in Loppi, Finland

A Jagdschloss was often the venue for a banquet accompanying a hunt, and sometimes it also hosted festivals and other events. The term Jagdschloss is often equated to the Lustschloss or maison de plaisance, particularly as the hunt was also a recreational activity. However, a Lustschloss and Jagdschloss differ in function as well as architecture. The layout and furnishing of a Lustschloss is unconstrained, while that of a Jagdschloss is always related to hunting: the walls may be adorned with antlers and other trophies, with scenes of hunting, and also by a deliberate use of wood or other natural materials.

A Jagdschloss could also be very lavishly furnished, but unlike a Lustschloss, timber-framed buildings or log cabins were not uncommon. Only a few imposing stone buildings have survived, which colours the general understanding of what a Jagdschloss is today. A Jagdschloss often had stables and other outbuildings used to house hunting equipment, coaches and the entourage. Larger examples often form self-contained ensembles, while smaller ones, known as Jagdhäuser, were often built within larger complexes such as castle parks and gardens, within range of the Residenz of the owner.

== Surviving Jagdschlösser ==
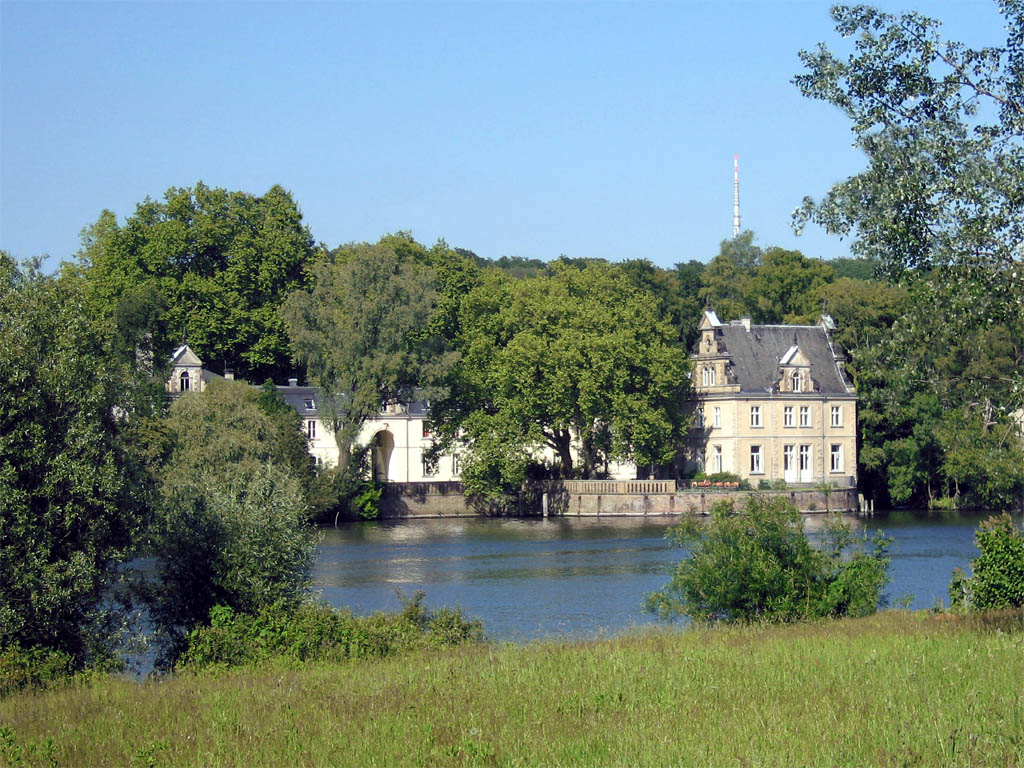
Glienicke Hunting Lodge

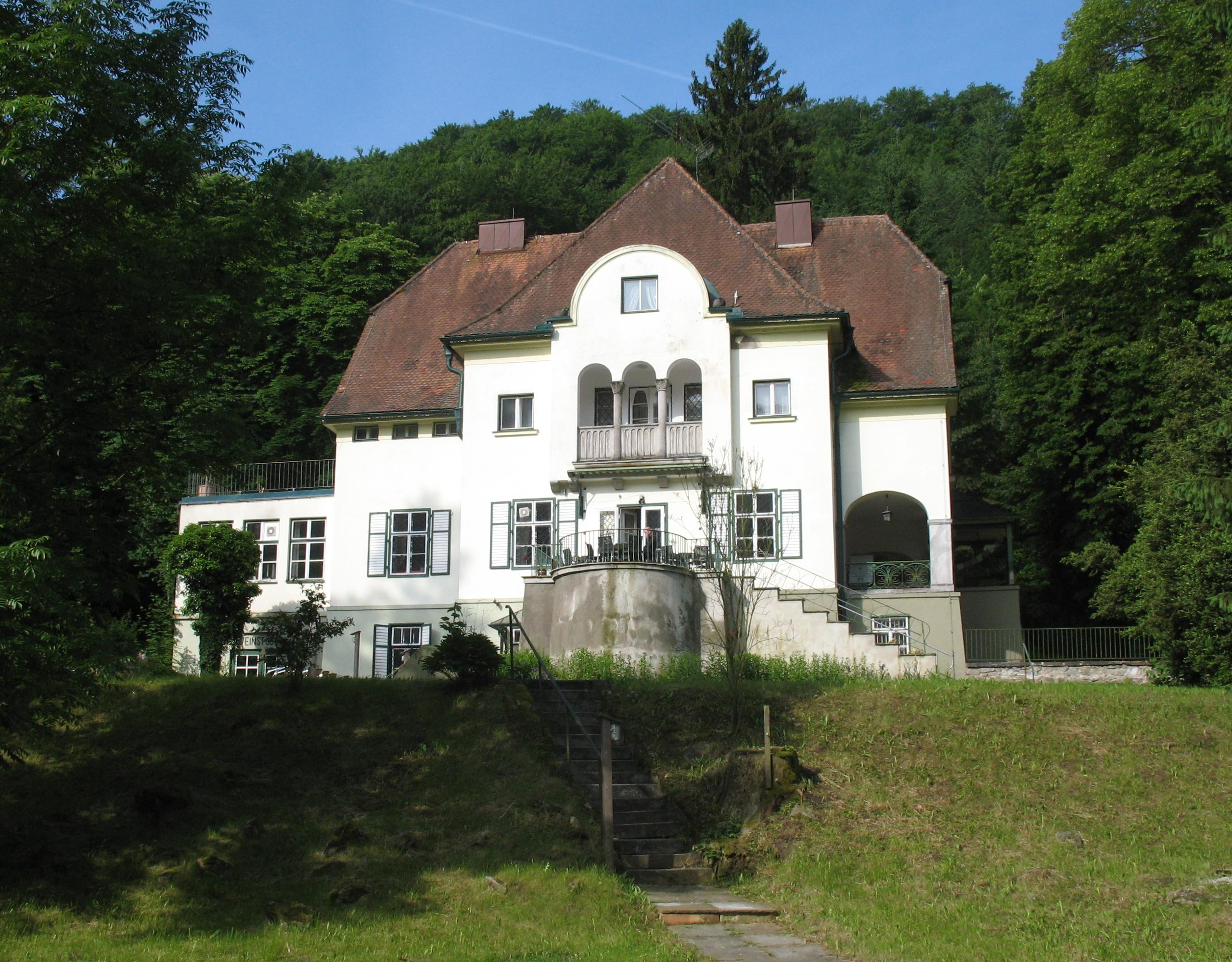
Jagdschloss Wolfstein in Kochholz

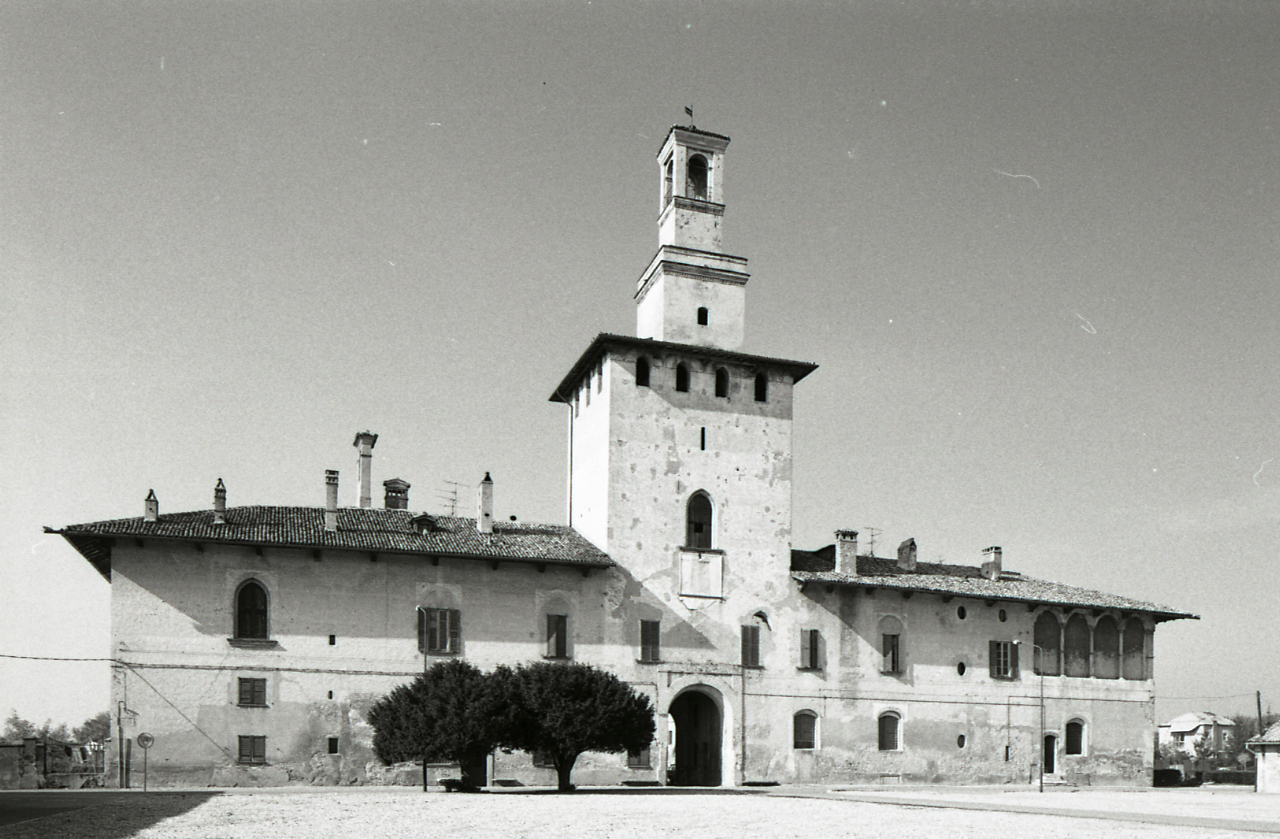
Visconti castle, Cusago. Photo by Paolo Monti.

- Amalienburg in the park of Nymphenburg Palace, Bavaria
- Augustusburg Hunting Lodge in Augustusburg, Saxony
- Baldone Manor in Zemgale, Latvia.
- Clemenswerth in Sögel, Lower Saxony
- Schloss Engers
- Falkenlust in Brühl, North Rhine-Westphalia
- Gelbensande Hunting Lodge
- Glienicke Hunting Lodge
- Göhrde Hunting Lodge
- Granitz Hunting Lodge
- Grünau Hunting Lodge by Neuburg on the Danube
- Grunewald Hunting Lodge in Berlin
- Hubertusstock Hunting Lodge in the Schorfheide
- Jagdschloss Kranichstein in Darmstadt
- Letzlingen Hunting Lodge
- Marshal's Cabin in Loppi, Finland
- Moritzburg Castle in Saxony
- Quitzin Hunting Lodge in Western Pomerania
- Rominten Hunting Lodge
- Springe Hunting Lodge
- Stern Hunting Lodge in Potsdam
- Wolfsgarten Castle in Hesse
- Wolfstein Hunting Lodge in Kochholz
- Schloss Fuschl in Austria
- Schloss Gräfendorf in Grafendorf
- Schloss Holzheim in Hesse

== See also ==
- Hunting Lodge (U.K.)
- Lustschloss
- Pavillon de chasse

== Literature ==
- Monique Chatenet (ed.): Maisons des champs dans l'Europe de la Renaissance. Actes des premières Rencontres d'architecture européenne, Château de Maisons, 10-13 juin 2003. Picard, Paris, 2006, ISBN 2-7084-0737-6, (De Architectura 11).
- Claude d'Anthenaise (ed.): Chasses princières dans l'Europe de la Renaissance. Actes du colloque de Chambord (1er et 2 octobre 2004). Fondation de la Maison de la Chasse et de la Nature. Actes Sud, Arles, 2007, ISBN 978-2-7427-6643-7.
- Heiko Laß: Jagd- und Lustschlösser: Art and culture of two sovereign construction tasks; shown in Thuringian constructions of the 17th and 18th century. Imhof, Petersberg, 2006, ISBN 3-86568-092-5
