= Stadtschloss =

Stadtschloss is the German word for a palace of a town, and may refer to:

- Stadtschloss, Berlin (Berlin City Palace), the former residence of the Hohenzollern rulers of Prussia and Imperial Germany
- Stadtschloss, Brunswick, residence of the Brunswick dukes from 1753 to 1918
- Stadtschloss, Darmstadt, former residence and administrative seat of the landgraves of Hesse and from 1806 to 1919 of the Grand Dukes of Hesse-Darmstadt
- Stadtschloss Hanau, the former residence of the counts of Hanau, and later secondary residence of the landgraves of Hesse-Kassel (later Electors of Hesse)
- Stadtschloss Kassel, the former residence of the landgraves of Hesse-Kassel
- Stadtschloss, Potsdam, another former Hohenzollern royal residence in Potsdam, Germany
- Stadtschloss, Weimar, the former residence of the Grand Dukes of Sachsen-Weimar-Eisenach
- Stadtschloss, Wiesbaden, the former residence of the Dukes of Nassau and current seat of the Hessian parliament

== See also ==
- Residenz
- City Palace (disambiguation)
