= Malte of Putbus =

Swedish-German Prince, Statesmen and General

His Serene Highness Wilhelm Malte von Putbus
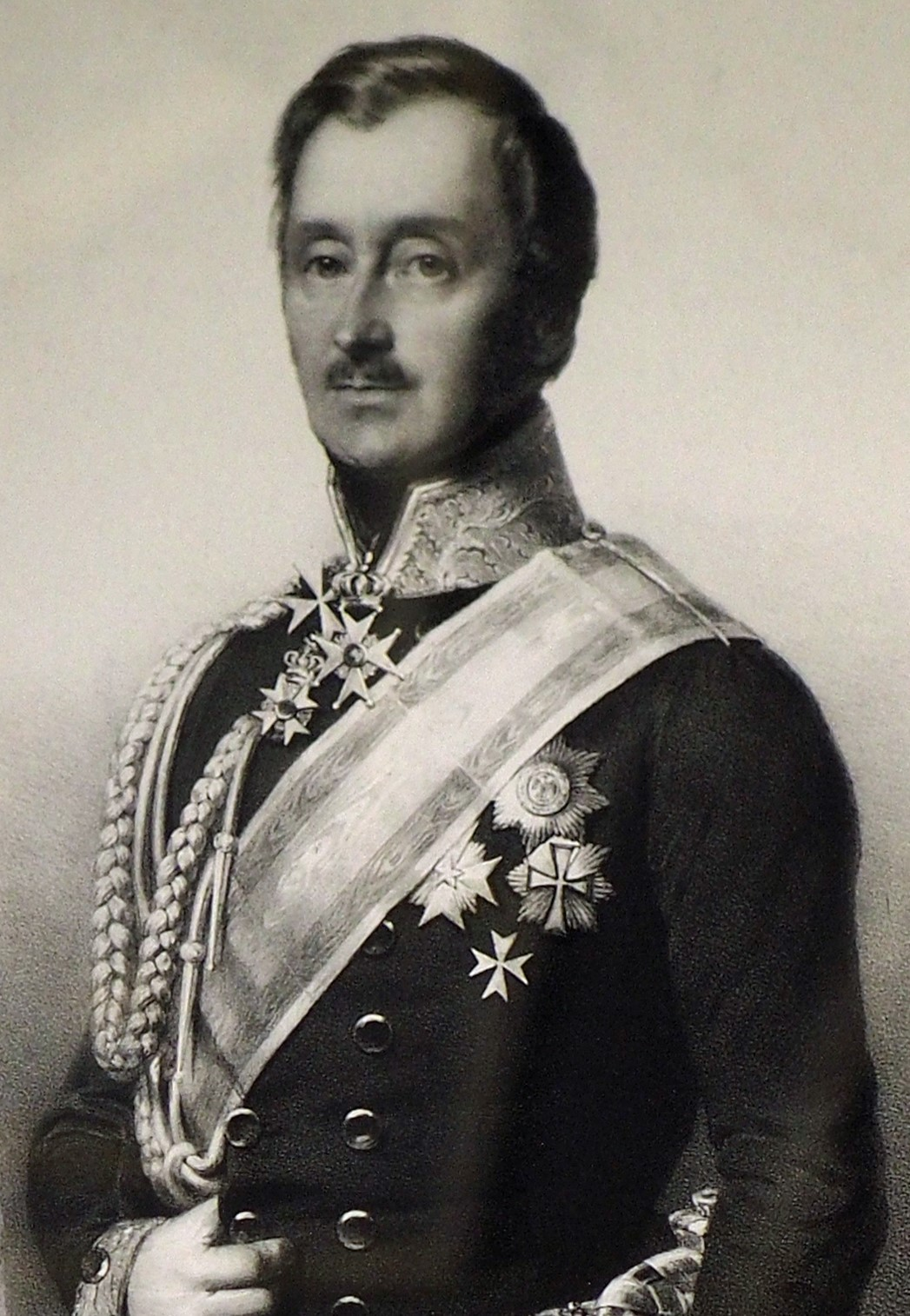
- Wilhelm Malte in a Prussian generaladjutants uniform.

Vice Governor of Pomerania
- In office 1813–1815
- Monarch: Charles XIII
- Preceded by: Carl Mörner af Tuna
- Succeeded by: (Swedish Pomerania ceded to Prussia)

Governor of New Pomerania and Rügen, Hereditary Lord Marshal
- In office 1815–1854
- Monarchs: Frederick William III; Frederick William IV
- Succeeded by: Wilhelm

Chancellor of the University of Greifswald
- Monarchs: Frederick William III; Frederick William IV
- Succeeded by: Wilhelm

Personal details
- Born: 1 August 1783 Putbus, Pomerania, Sweden
- Died: 26 September 1854 (aged 71) Putbus, Pomerania, Prussia
- Resting place: Vilmnitz church
- Education: University of Greifswald; University of Göttingen

Military service
- Rank: General of Infantry
- Unit: Life Guards of Horse
- Commands: 2nd Landwehr Regiment

Wilhelm Malte I Fürst und Herr zu Putbus (1783 – 1854) was a German prince (Fürst) from the old Slavic-Rügen noble family of the lords of Putbus. He acted as a Swedish governor in Swedish Pomerania and later, under Prussian rule, as the chairman of the regional council (Kommunallandtag) of Pomerania and Rügen.

As a result of his extensive building activity, Wilhelm Malte left many traces of the first half of the 19th century on the island of Rügen. Under his rule, his home town of Putbus was greatly expanded in the classical style and is still known today as "The White Town".

== Life ==
Wilhelm Malte was born on 1 August 1783 in Putbus, when Rügen still belonged to Sweden as a result of the Thirty Years' War. He was the son of the Swedish Marshal of the Court, Malte Friedrich of Putbus and his wife Sophie Wilhelmine, née Countess von der Schulenburg. After studying at the University of Greifswald and Göttingen, he entered military service in Sweden on 21 July 1800 with the Stockholm Life Hussars. After becoming a Swedish chamberlain on 14 September 1802, Wilhelm Malte was elevated on 25 May 1807 by King Gustav IV Adolf of Sweden to the rank of a prince (Fürst).

After the end of French occupation, he was nominated in 1813 by the Swedish Crown Prince and Regent, later Charles XIV John Bernadotte, as Governor-general of Swedish Pomerania. This office was traditionally linked to the office of Chancellor of the University of Greifswald.

As a result of the Treaty of Kiel, Rügen became Danish for a short time in 1814 and then went to Prussia in 1815 in exchange for its support in the cession of Norway to Sweden, not least because of the involvement of the prince. In 1817, Wilhelm Malte's princely rank was confirmed by Frederick William III of Prussia, and so was his position as Governor-general. The office of university chancellor was approved and the honour of a hereditary Lord Marshal (Erblandmarschall) of the House of Putbus was bestowed on the prince. This also gave him the right to preside over the regional council (Kommunallandtag) for Neuvorpommern and Rügen. and an individual vote (Virilstimme) in the Pomeranian provincial parliament.

In the same year, he acquired the lordship of Spyker from Count Magnus Fredrik Brahe. He held the title of a governor-general as well as the corresponding salary, because an appointment as the President (Regierungspräsident) of the government district of Stralsund would have been tantamount to a curb of his powers.

King Frederick William III entrusted him with diplomatic missions, such as the coronation of the British Queen Victoria.

Under his rule, there was a building boom that has left an indelible mark on the island of Rügen, and he also presided over economic and cultural development. In 1832, Putbus Palace, originally a castle complex from the 14th century, extended in the Renaissance and Baroque periods, was redesigned in a neoclassical style according to plans of the Berlin architect Johann Gottfried Steinmeyer. (After a fire, it was again redesigned in 1872, and demolished by communist East Germany in 1962.) 1827-1836 Wilhelm had the new Granitz Hunting Lodge built on the site of an older hunting lodge, based on plans by Karl Friedrich Schinkel.

He was also involved in sugar mills and chalk factories, had shipbuilding established in Seedorf and founded the first seaside resort on Rügen at Lauterbach. He had 655 acres of land settled with indivisible peasant holdings, held under hereditary leases. In addition, in 1836, he founded the Pedagogium Putbus, a school for boys from the middle classes and aristocracy. This laid the foundation of a tradition of education in Putbus that continues to the present day.

The prince died on 26 September 1854 at Putbus of a bladder disease after a long illness. He was laid to rest in the family vault of Putbus in the church at Vilmnitz.

== Progeny ==
With the death of Wilhelm Malte, the House of Putbus died out because of the untimely death of his only son, Malte (born 16 September 1807, died 28 April 1837). The title of prince and primogeniture went to his grandson, Wilhelm Carl Gustav Malte, Reichsgraf von Wylich und Lottum (born 16 April 1833, died 18 April 1907), son of his eldest daughter, Clotilde (born 23 April 1809, died 19 October 1894), bestowed by the Prussian king. He left two daughters and was succeeded by the elder one, Asta, Countess of Wylich und Lottum, Princess of Putbus. Upon her death in 1934, she left her estate, including one sixth of the island of Rugen, to her sister Viktoria Wanda's son, Malte von Veltheim (1889-1945), who took on the name „von Putbus“ (with consent of the German minister of the Interior). He later turned against the Nazi regime and died on 10 February 1945, allegedly killed with a poisonous injection, at Sachsenhausen concentration camp.

His only son, Franz von Putbus (b. 28 May 1927, d. 5 April 2004), styled himself as Prince and Lord of Putbus (recognized by the judicial committee of the umbrella organization of Germany's nobility associations, and such entered into the Almanach de Gotha). He tried in vain to recover his father's expropriated fortunes, but his claim was turned down by the Federal Administrative Court in 1998. He however bought back minor parts of it, including a house on the Circle in front of Putbus Palace (which had been demolished by the East German Government in 1962). He was succeeded by his only son, Malte, prince of Putbus (born 1964).

== Images ==
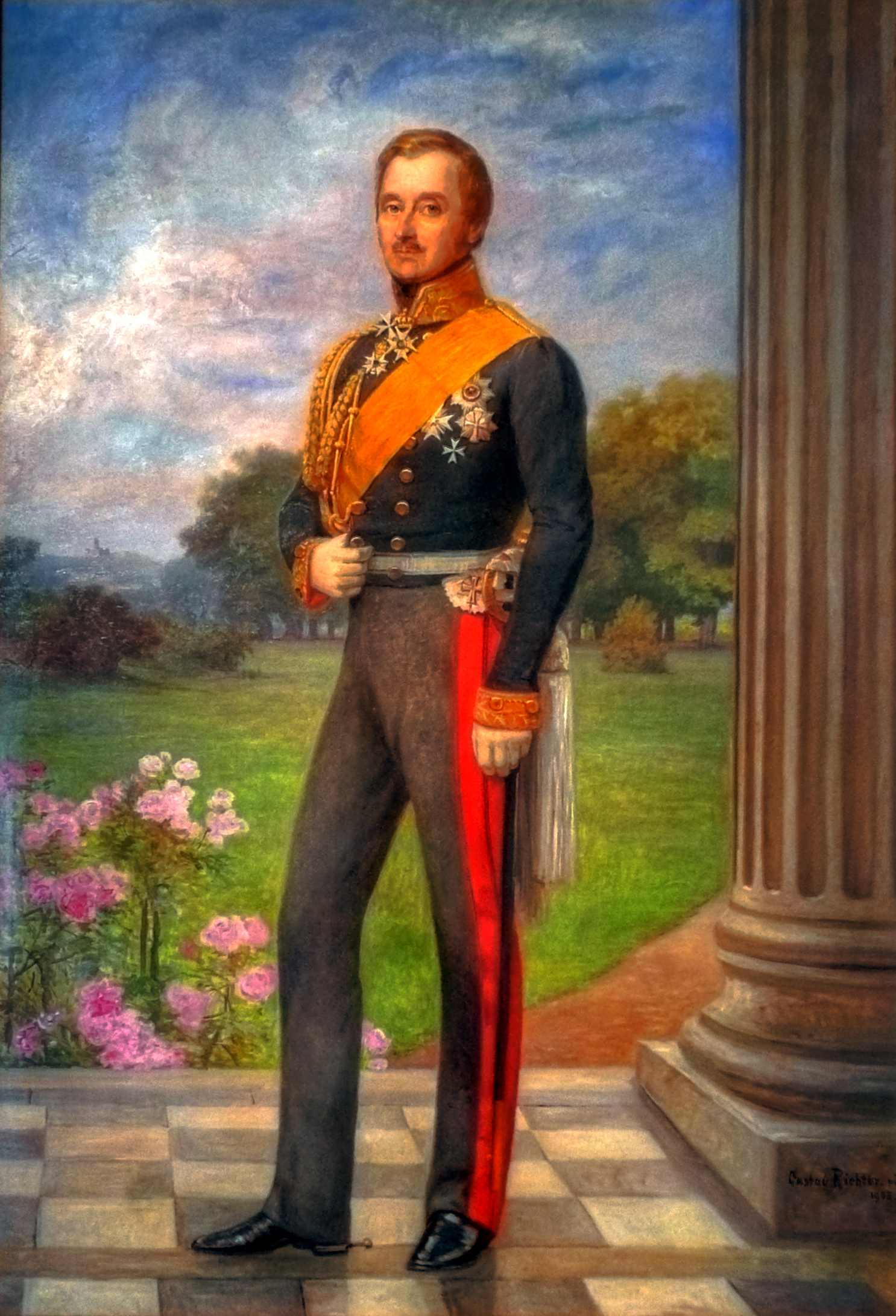
Portrait of Wilhelm Malte I, Granitz Hunting Lodge

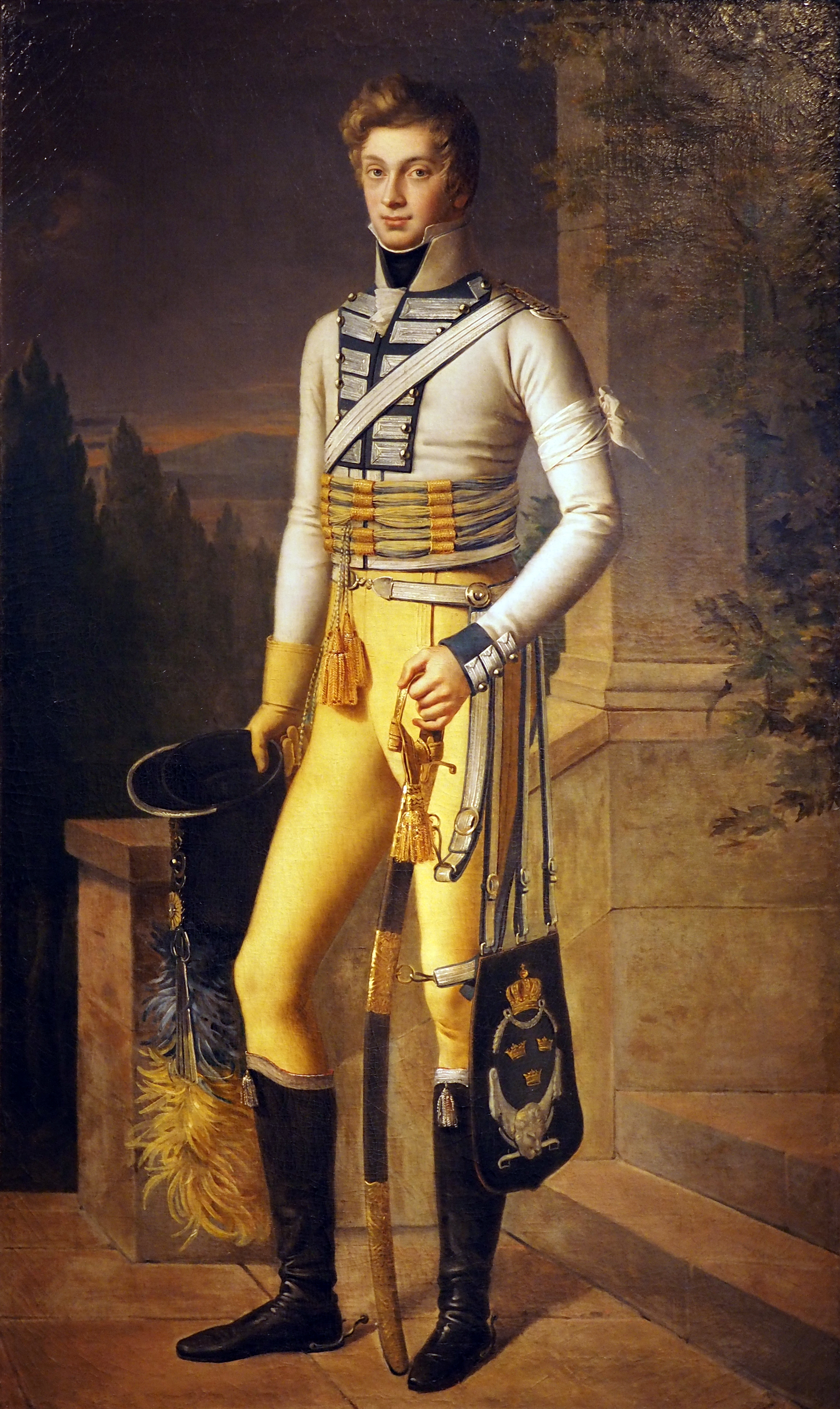
A young Wilhelm Malte in the uniform of a cornet in the Swedish Light Life Dragoon Regiment, oil painting in Granitz Hunting Lodge on Rügen.

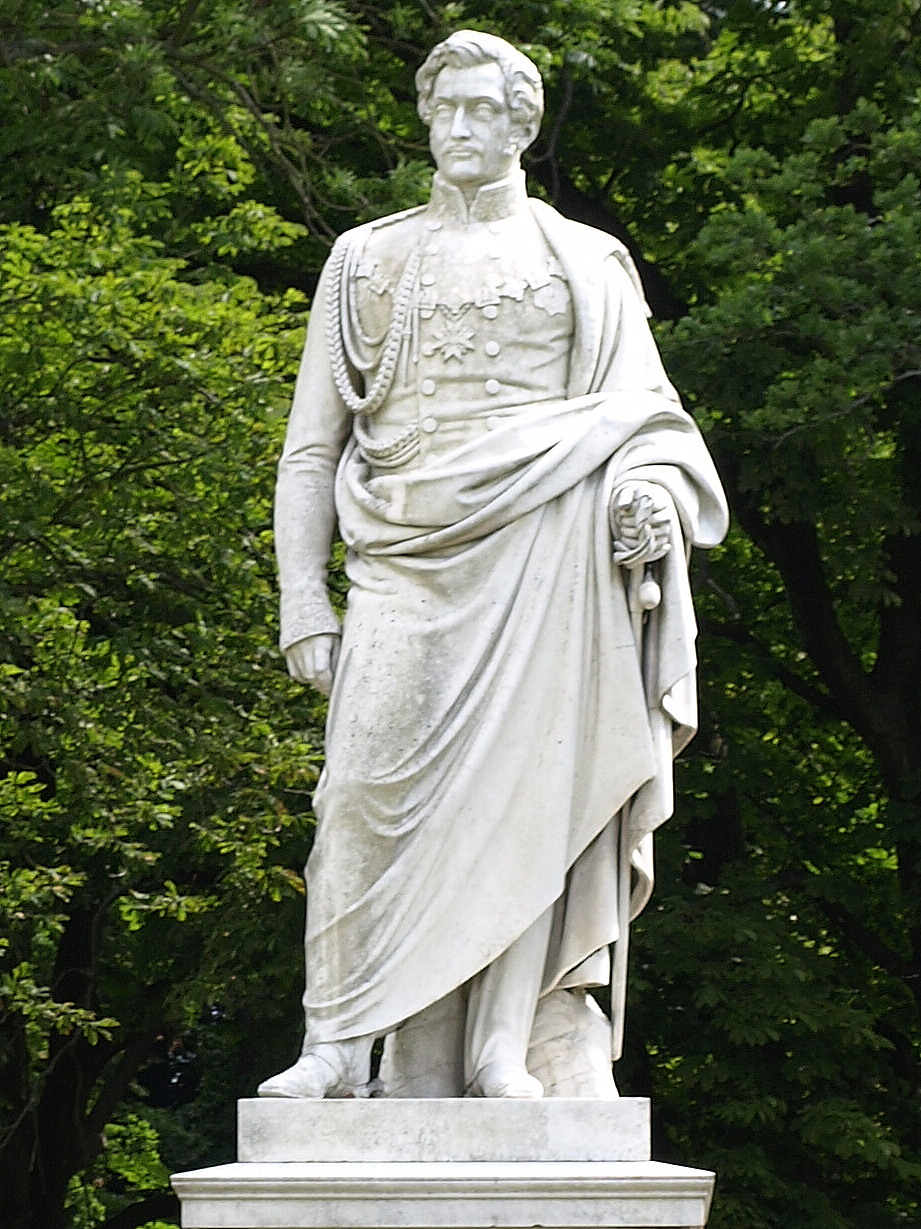
Monument to Wilhelm Malte I, erected in 1859 by Friedrich Drake

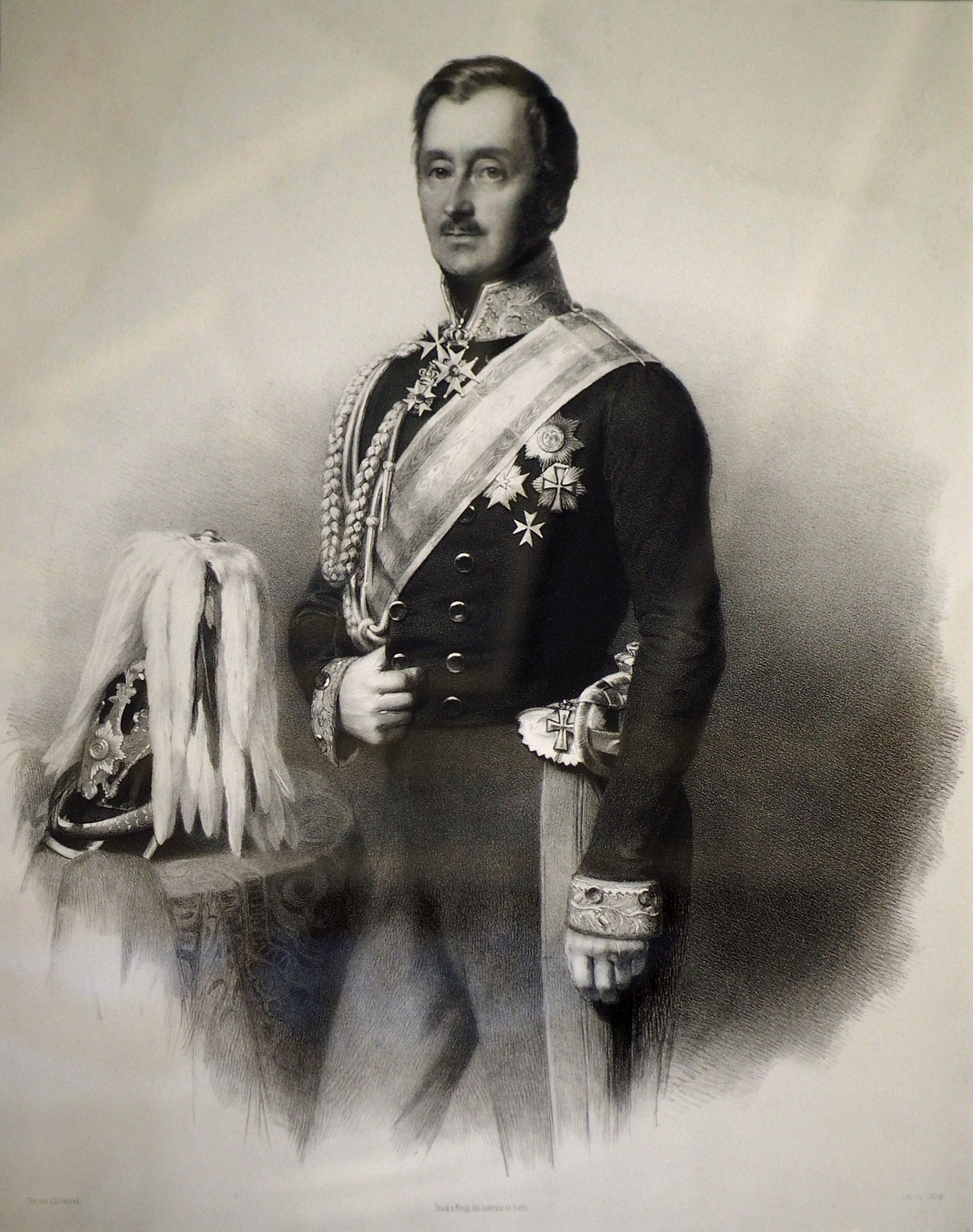
Lithography of Wilhelm Malte I wearing the sash of the Order of the Red Eagle and the Star in Diamonds

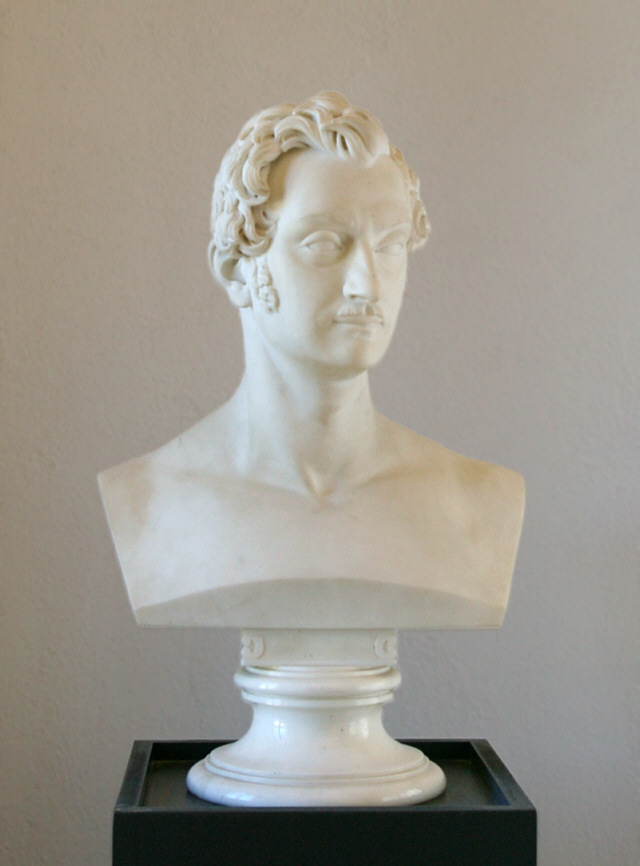
Bust of Wilhelm Malte I, Granitz Hunting Lodge

== Honours and awards ==
- Prussia:
  - Knight of the Order of the Black Eagle, with Collar.
  - Knight of the Order of the Red Eagle 1st Class, in Diamonds.
  - Knight of Honor of the Order of Saint John, (Bailiwick of Brandenburg).
- Sweden:
  - Knight of the Order of the Sword.
  - Commanders Grand Cross of the Order of the Polar Star.
- Denmark:
  - Grand Cross of the Order of the Dannebrog, in Diamonds.

=== Arms ===
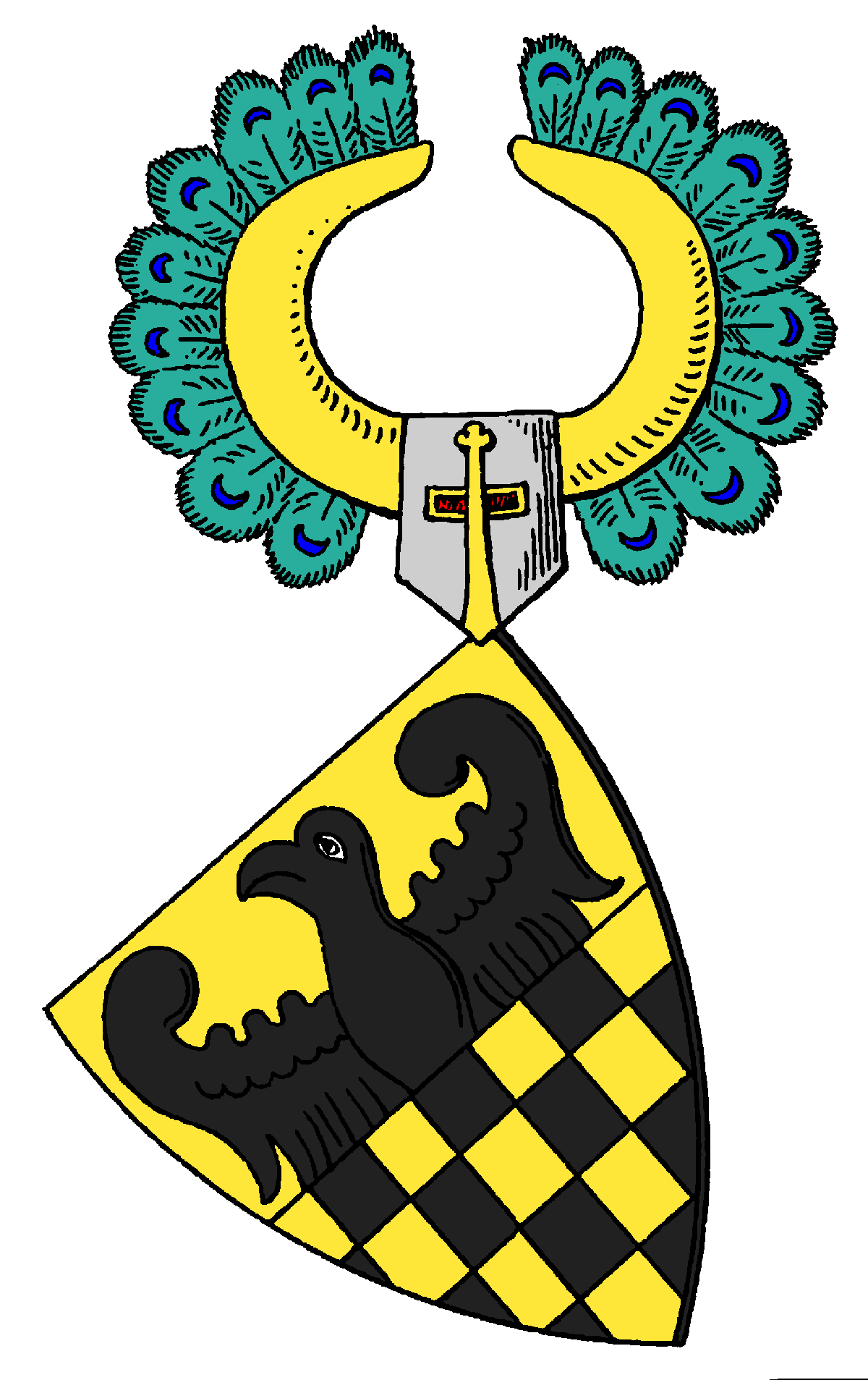
Coat of arms of the ancient Putbus family.

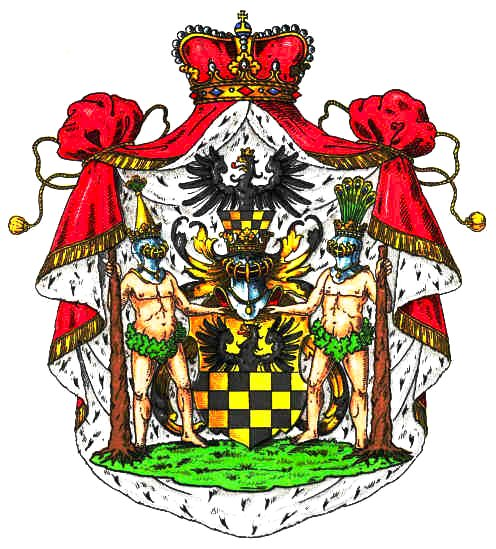
Coat of arms of Wilhelm Malte I as Prince of Rügen.

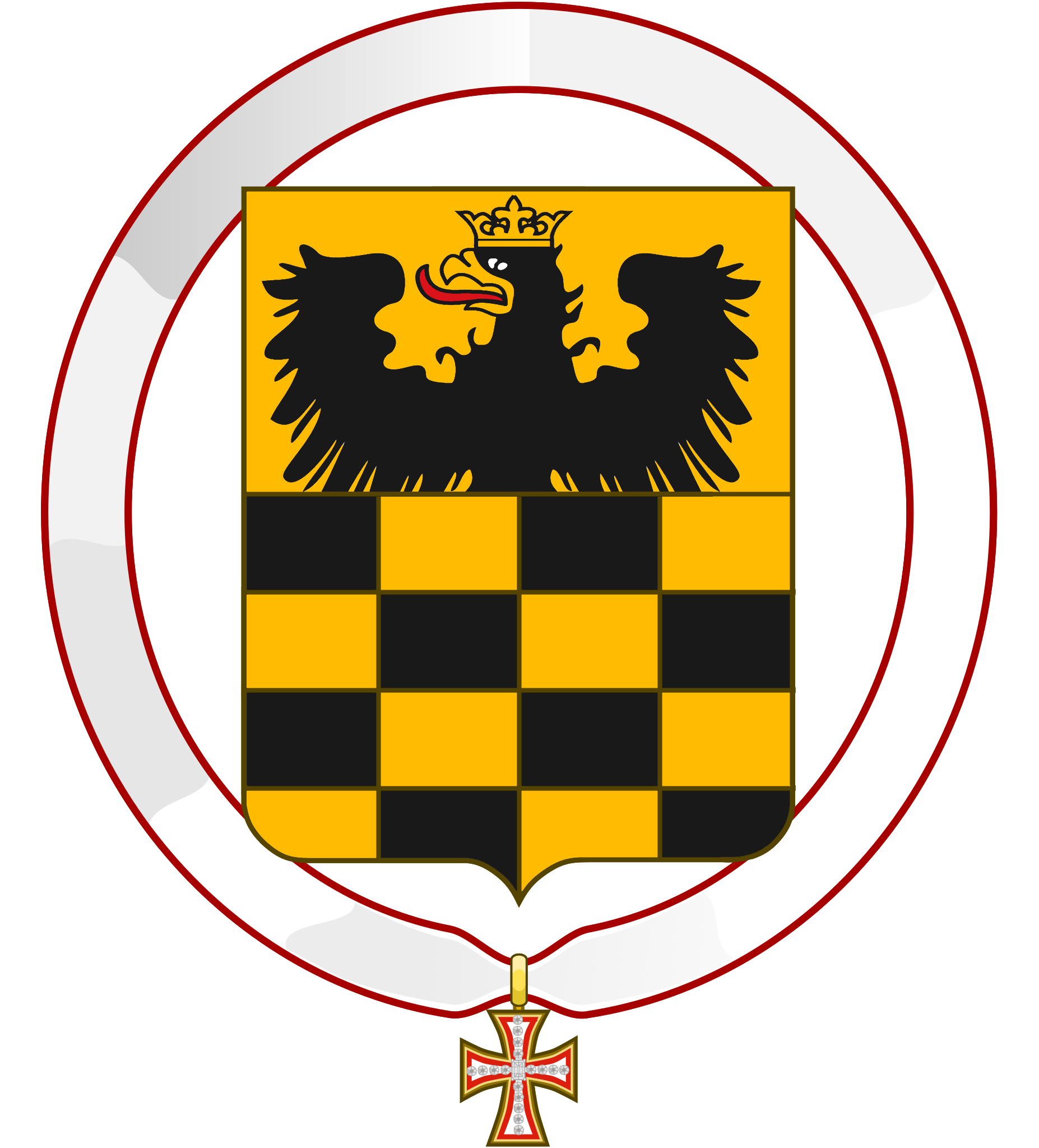
Coat of Arms of Wilhelm Malte I as a Knight of the Order of the Dannebrog.

== Buildings ==
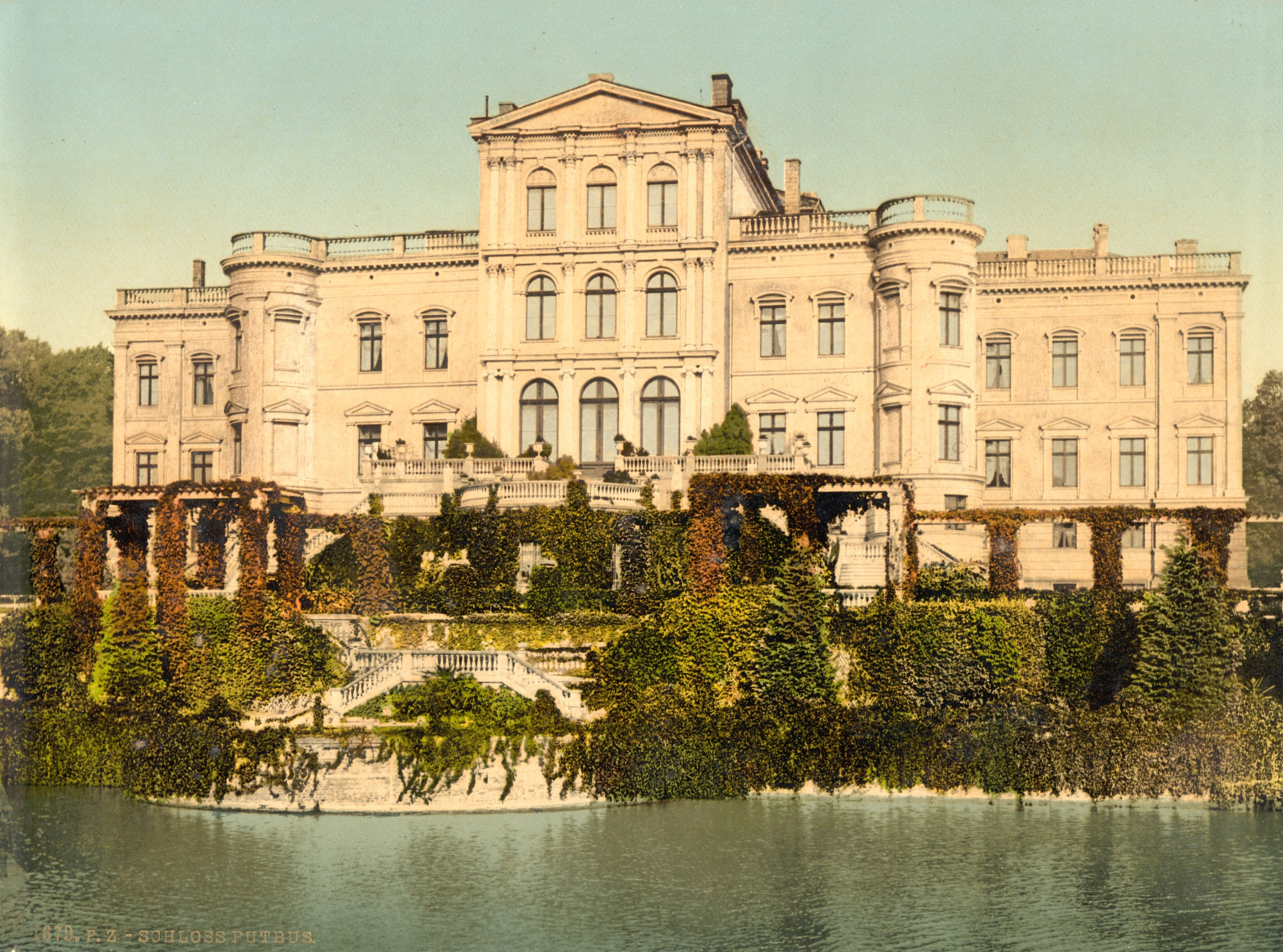
Putbus Palace (around 1900; demolished in 1962)

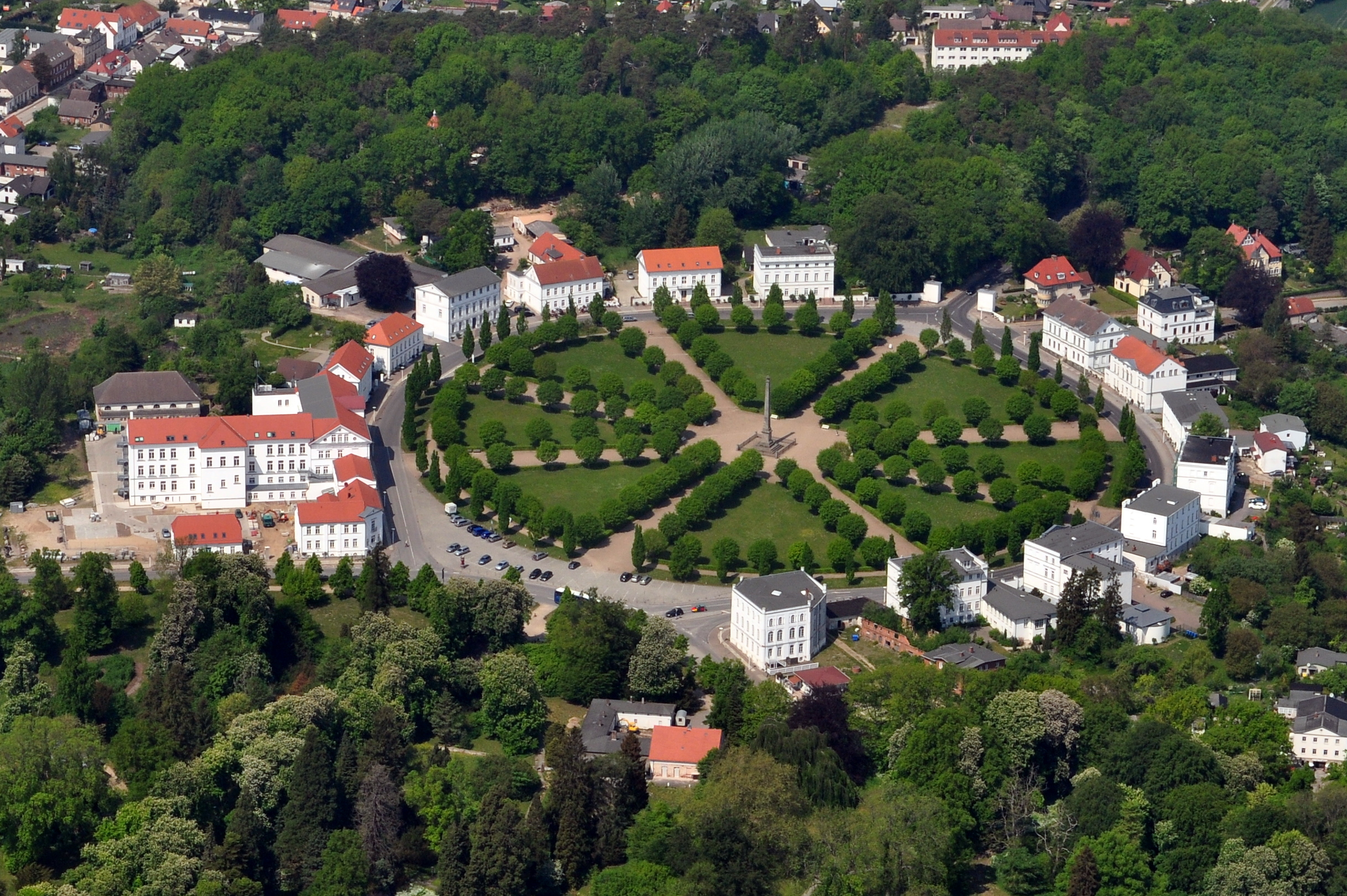
Putbus Circus, residence of officials and administration, with the empty former location of the palace, bottom left

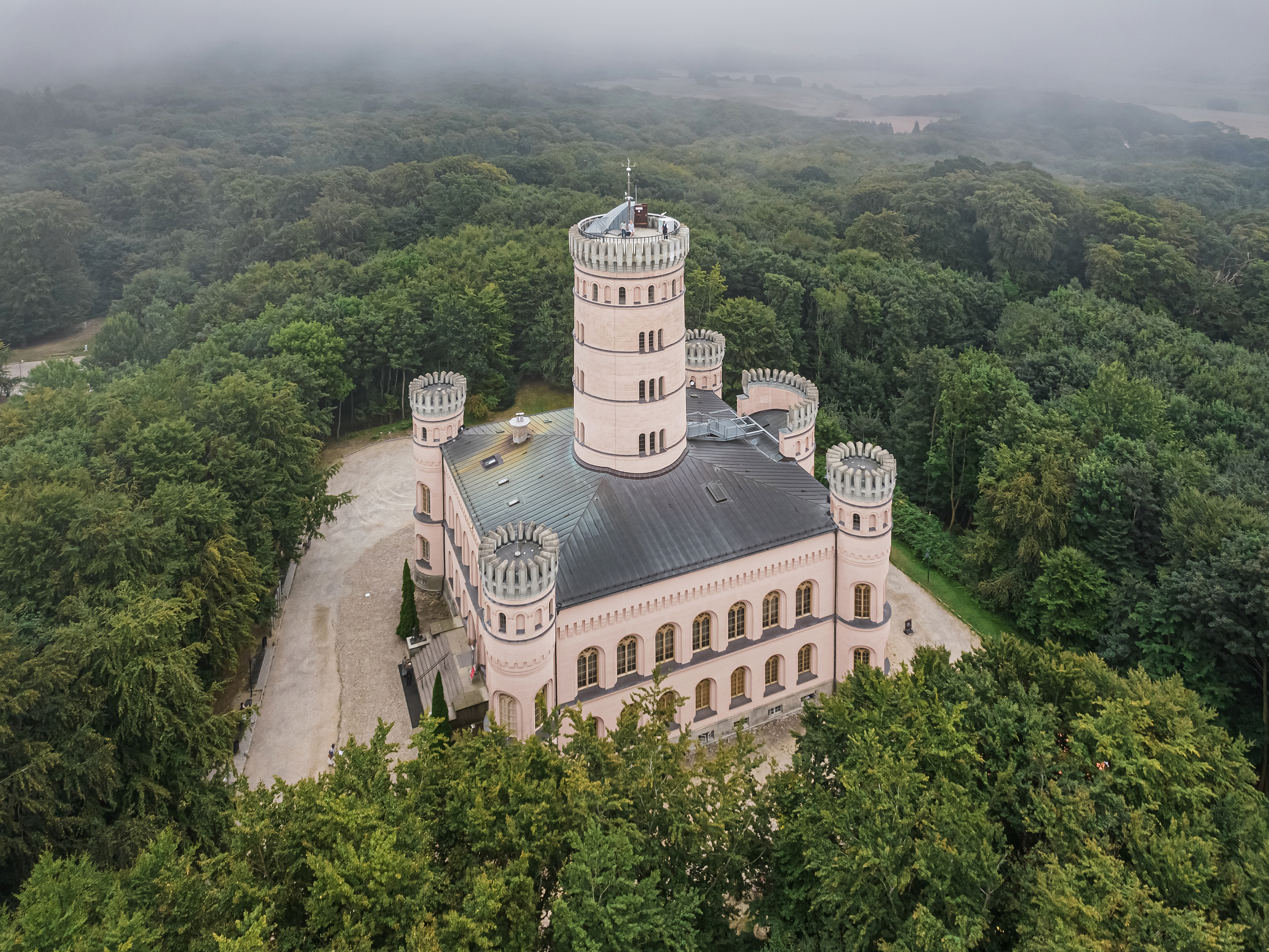
Granitz Hunting Lodge

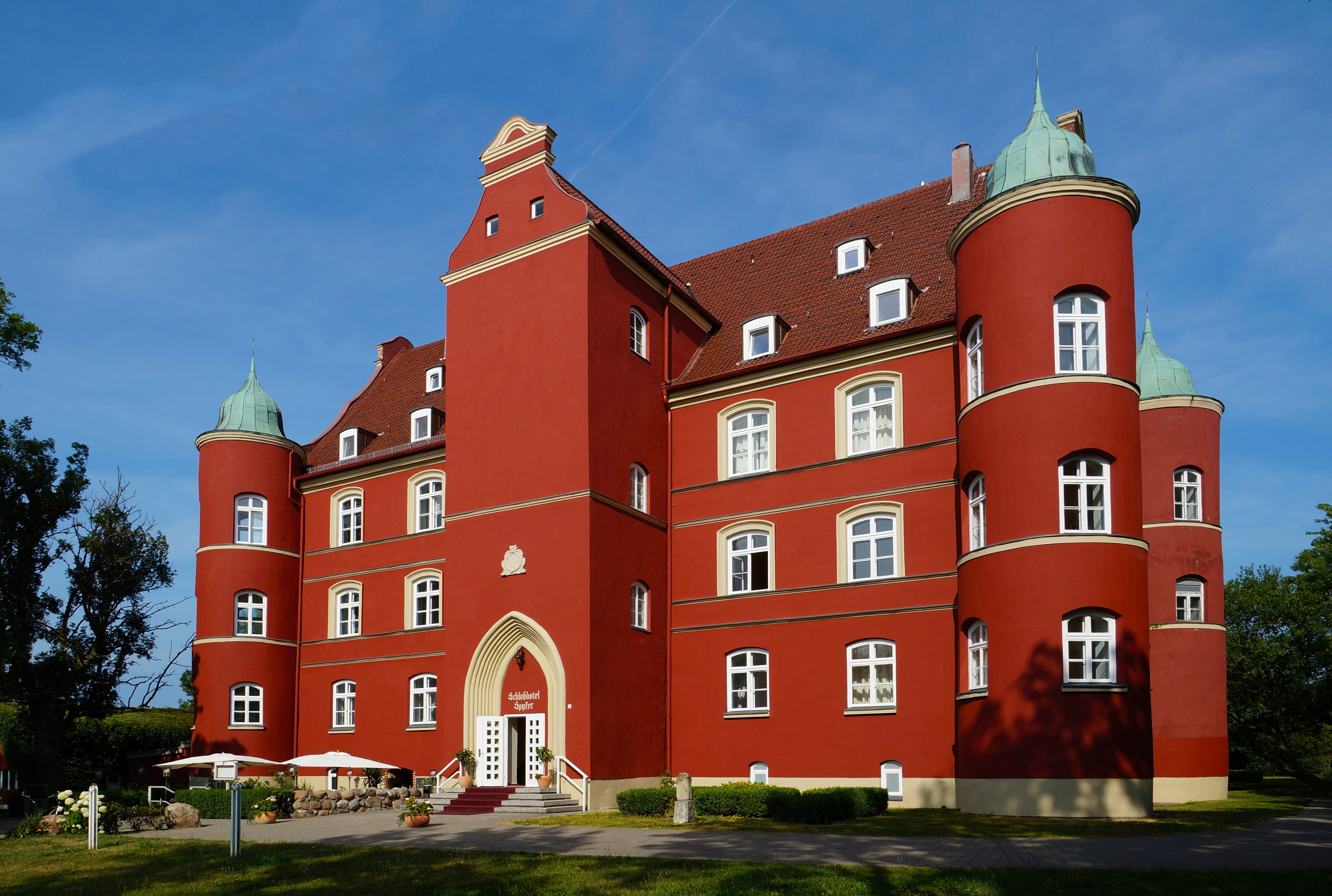
Spycker Castle, Rügen (acquired in 1817)

== Literature ==
- Kurt von Priesdorff: Soldatisches Führertum, Vol. 4, Hanseatische Verlagsanstalt Hamburg 1936-1945, pp. 141–142
- Andre Farin: Wilhelm Malte zu Putbus und seine Fürstenresidenz auf der Insel Rügen. Eine Biographie über eine norddeutsche Gründerpersönlichkeit des 19. Jahrhunderts. 4th edition, Farin, Putbus 2007, ISBN 3-00-008844-X.
- Johannes Friedrich Weise: Zwischen Strandleben und Ackerbau. Die Herrschaft Putbus im 19. Jahrhundert. Ingo Koch Verlag, Rostock 2003, ISBN 3-935319-93-2.
- Theodor Pyl (1888). "Putbus, von" . Allgemeine Deutsche Biographie (in German). Vol. 26. Leipzig: Duncker & Humblot. pp. 738–742. - mentioned in family article
- Martin Schoebel (2003). "Putbus, Wilhelm Malte Fürst". Neue Deutsche Biographie (in German). Vol. 21. Berlin: Duncker & Humblot. pp. 17–18.
