= Count of Wylich and Lottum =

Count of Wylich and Lottum (German:Graf von Wylich und Lottum) may refer to:

- Carl Philipp, Reichsgraf von Wylich und Lottum (1650–1719), a Prussian field marshal
- Johann Christoph, Graf von Wylich und Lottum (1681–1727), a Prussian major-general
- Friedrich Wilhelm, Graf von Wylich und Lottum (1716–1774), a Prussian major-general, commandant of Berlin
- Friedrich Albrecht Karl Herrmann, Reichsgraf von Wylich und Lottum (1720–1797) a Prussian general of cavalry
- Heinrich Christoph Karl Herrmann, Reichsgraf von Wylich und Lottum (1773–1830), a Prussian major-general fought in the Napoleonic Wars including the Waterloo Campaign
- Carl Friedrich Heinrich, Graf von Wylich und Lottum (1767–1841), a Prussian infantry general and minister of state
- Wilhelm Carl Gustav Malte, Reichsgraf von Wylich und Lottum (1833–1907), in 1861 after the death of the last male member of the House of Putbus in the male line, he became Wilhelm Malte II, Prince of Putbus

== See also ==
de:Wylich und Lottum – an article on the German Wikipedia about this family
