= Wilhelm Malte II =

Prussian general and statesman (1833–1907)

His Serene Highness Wilhelm
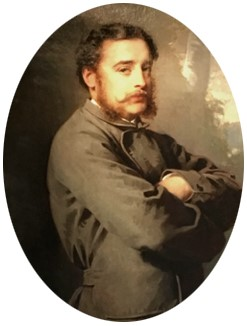
- Wilhelm C.G. Malte in his younger years from circa 1861.

Governor of New Pomerania and Rügen, Hereditary Lord Marshal
- In office 1861–1907
- Monarchs: Wilhelm I Frederick III; Wilhelm II
- Preceded by: Wilhelm Malte von Putbus
- Succeeded by: (office became de facto void by the late 19th century)

Chancellor of the University of Greifswald
- Monarchs: Wilhelm I Frederick III; Wilhelm II

Personal details
- Born: 16 April 1833 Naples, Kingdom of the Two Sicilies
- Died: 18 March 1907 (aged 74) Pegli, Genoa, Italy
- Resting place: Vilmnitz church
- Education: University of Greifswald; University of Göttingen; University of Berlin

Military service
- Rank: General of Cavalry

Wilhelm Malte II Fürst und Herr zu Putbus, born Wilhelm Carl Gustav Malte Reichsgraf von Wylich und Lottum (German: [wɪlˈhɛlːm mal̩ːtə]; 16 April 1833 – 18 April 1907) was a Prussian general and statesman. After the death of his maternal grandfather Malte the house of Putbus went extinct in the male line. In 1861 by decision of King Wilhelm I of Prussia the succession to the house of Putbus was passed down to Wilhelm C.G. Malte and he was given the title of Prince (Fürst) of Putbus.

== Biography ==
He was the second son of Count Hermann Friedrich von Wylich und Lottum (1796–1849) and his wife Clothilde, née Countess zu Putbus (1809–1894). His paternal grandfather was the Prussian general and finance minister Carl Friedrich Heinrich, Graf von Wylich und Lottum, his maternal grandfather was Prince Wilhelm Malte von Putbus, Vice Governor of Swedish Pomerania and from 1817 of Prussian New Western Pomerania.

After the death of Prince Wilhelm Malte on 26 September 1854, his wife Princess Luise, divorced Countess von Veltheim, née Freiin von Lauterbach, inherited the Majorat as a previous heir. The only son of the princely couple, Count Malte (1807–1837) was unmarried and died without a legitimate heir (his illegitimate son was not entitled to inherit). When Princess Luise died on 27 September 1860, Wilhelm Carl Gustav Malte, the second son of Clothilde, the eldest daughter of the princely couple, took over the inheritance.

At the express request of Prince Wilhelm Malte, the Swedish document of 1807 on his elevation to the rank of prince had stipulated that only the direct male successors should be entitled to the title of prince. In 1817, King Frederick William III had confirmed the rank of prince for Prussia. Therefore, in March 1861, contrary to Swedish provision, the Prussian King Wilhelm I raised his grandson Wilhelm Malte, Graf von Wylich und Lottum with the title Prince and Lord of Putbus to the Prussian princely status. Wilhelm Malte was a member of the Prussian House of Lords, until 1888 Obersttruchseß, as well as Hereditary Lord Marshal in the Principality of Rügen and the Land of Barth. As Prince of Putbus, he was entitled to a viril vote, he was a member of the Provincial Parliament of the Province of Pomerania.

Already under Wilhelm Malte there were close relations between the Prussian royal house and the house of Putbus. King Frederick William IV visited the princely residence in Putbus as crown prince in 1820, 1825 and in 1843, 1846, and 1853 as king. The close ties between Putbus and Berlin were further strengthened under Wilhelm Malte in 1860, still under the reign of Princess Luise, Crown Prince Frederick and his wife Victoria visited the residential palace in Putbus.

From 1818 to the middle of the 19th century, Lauterbach, a district of Putbus, was a luxury bath of the nobility, despite its distance to the sea. In order to make the residence even more attractive for bathers, Wilhelm Malte ordered the construction of a railway line from Putbus to the seaside resort of Binz, which was inaugurated in the summer of 1895. Four years later, the entire line to Göhren was completed.

In 1860 Putbus joined the Order of St. John as a Knight of Honour and became a Knight of the Law in 1867; he was a member of the Pomeranian Cooperative of the Order. The extensive possessions of the prince included several manors and estates, partly managed by himself, individually also leased, even to Putbus Palace belonged an assigned 732 ha manor.

He is buried at the Putbus family crypt at Vilmnitz Church.

== Progeny ==
=== Ancestry ===
Ancestors of Wilhelm Malte II

8. Malte Friedrich, Graf und Herr zu Putbus
4. Malte zu Putbus
9. Sophia Wilhelmina, Gräfin von der Schulenburg
2. Clothilde zu Putbus
10. Johann Christoph von Lauterbach
5. Luise von Lauterbach
11. Susanne Elisabeth Hindermann
1. Wilhelm zu Putbus
12. Friedrich Wilhelm, Graf von Wylich und Lottum
6. Carl Heinrich, Graf von Wylich und Lottum
13. Anna Dorothea Scherff
3. Hermann, Graf von Wylich und Lottum
14. Joachim Friedrich von Lamprecht
7. Sophie Luise Friederike von Lamprecht
15. Marie Luise Druckenbrodt

Wilhelm married his cousin Wanda Maria Freiin von Veltheim-Bartensleben (1837–1867), later Princess Wanda von Putbus, on 1 July 1857. The daughters of the first princely couple (Wilhelm Malte I and Luise), Clothilde (1809–1894), married to Count Hermann Friedrich von Wylich und Lottum, and Asta Luise (1812–1850), married to Franz von Veltheim (1812–1874), were the mothers of the second princely couple. Princess Wanda died on 18 December 1867 in Berlin, sixteen days after the birth of her fifth daughter Wanda Auguste. They had five daughters:

- Marie Luise Clotilde Agnes, Countess of Wylich and Lottum, Princess of Putbus (1858–1930) 1877 Franz von Veltheim (1848–1927) ⚭
- Asta Eugenie Countess of Wylich and Lottum, Princess of Putbus (1860–1934) Karl von Riepenhausen (1852–1929) ⚭
- Victoria Wanda, Countess of Wylich and Lottum (1861–1933) ⚭ 17 January 1888 Ludolph Heinrich von Veltheim
- Margarethe Rosa Alma, Countess of Wylich and Lottum (1864–1948) Hans Wurmb von Zinck (1849–1892) ⚭
- Wanda Auguste, Countess of Wylich and Lottum (1867–1930) Ernst zu Löwenstein-Wertheim-Freudenberg (1854–1931) ⚭

The heiress of the principality was first the eldest daughter Marie, then her next younger sister Asta. Since both had no surviving descendants, the Princely Putbus Fideikommiss fell in 1934 to the son of the third daughter Victoria, Malte von Veltheim-Lottum, who took the family name Malte von und zu Putbus on 20 October 1938 with the approval of the Reich Minister of the Interior. He died in 1945 in the Sachsenhausen concentration camp.

== Images ==
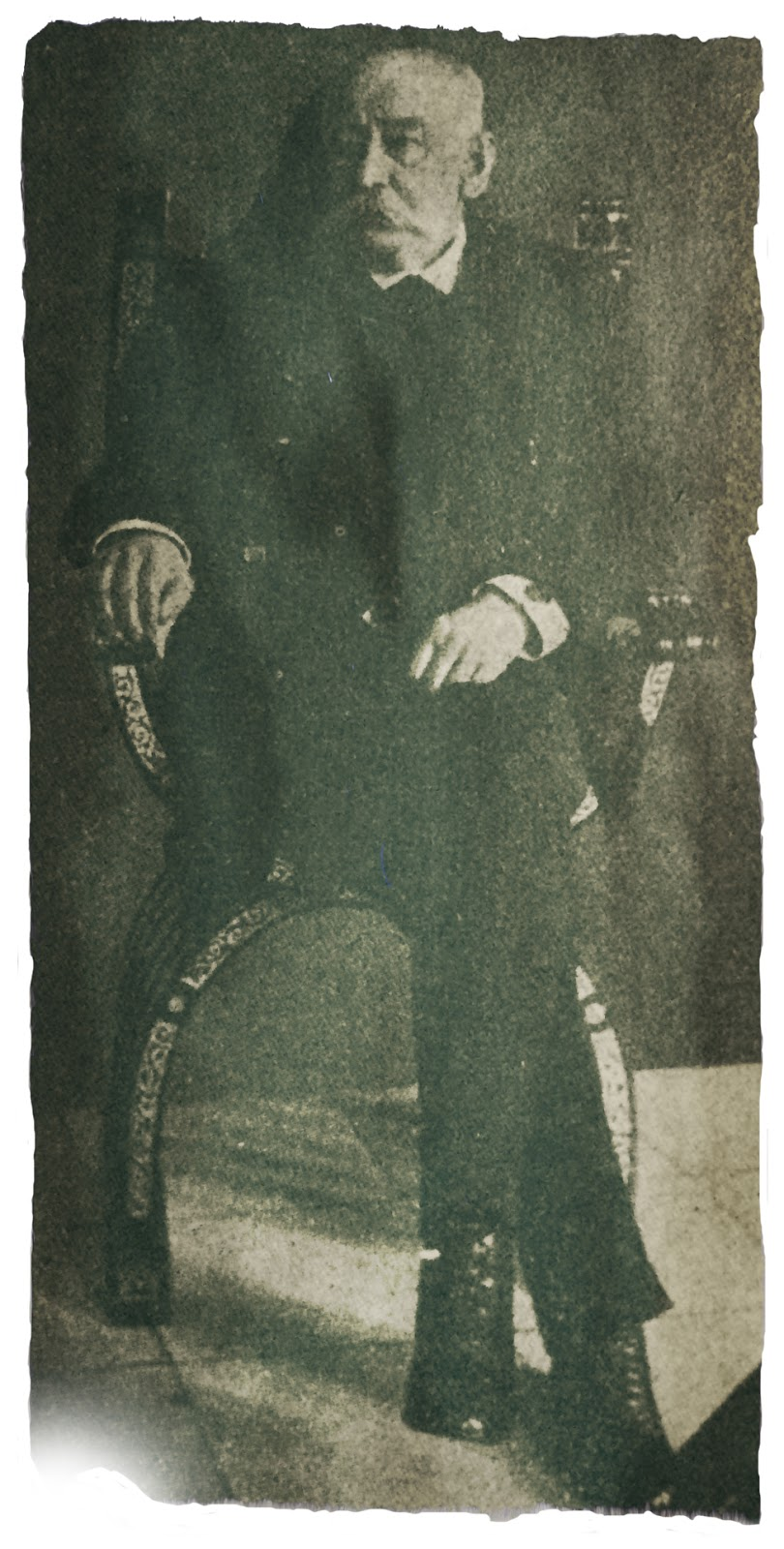
Wilhelm at Putbus Palace.

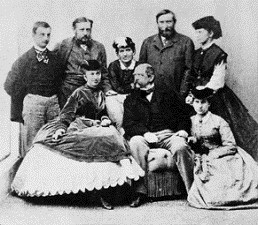
Wilhelm and his family with Chancellor Otto von Bismarck at the Putbus Palace in 1866

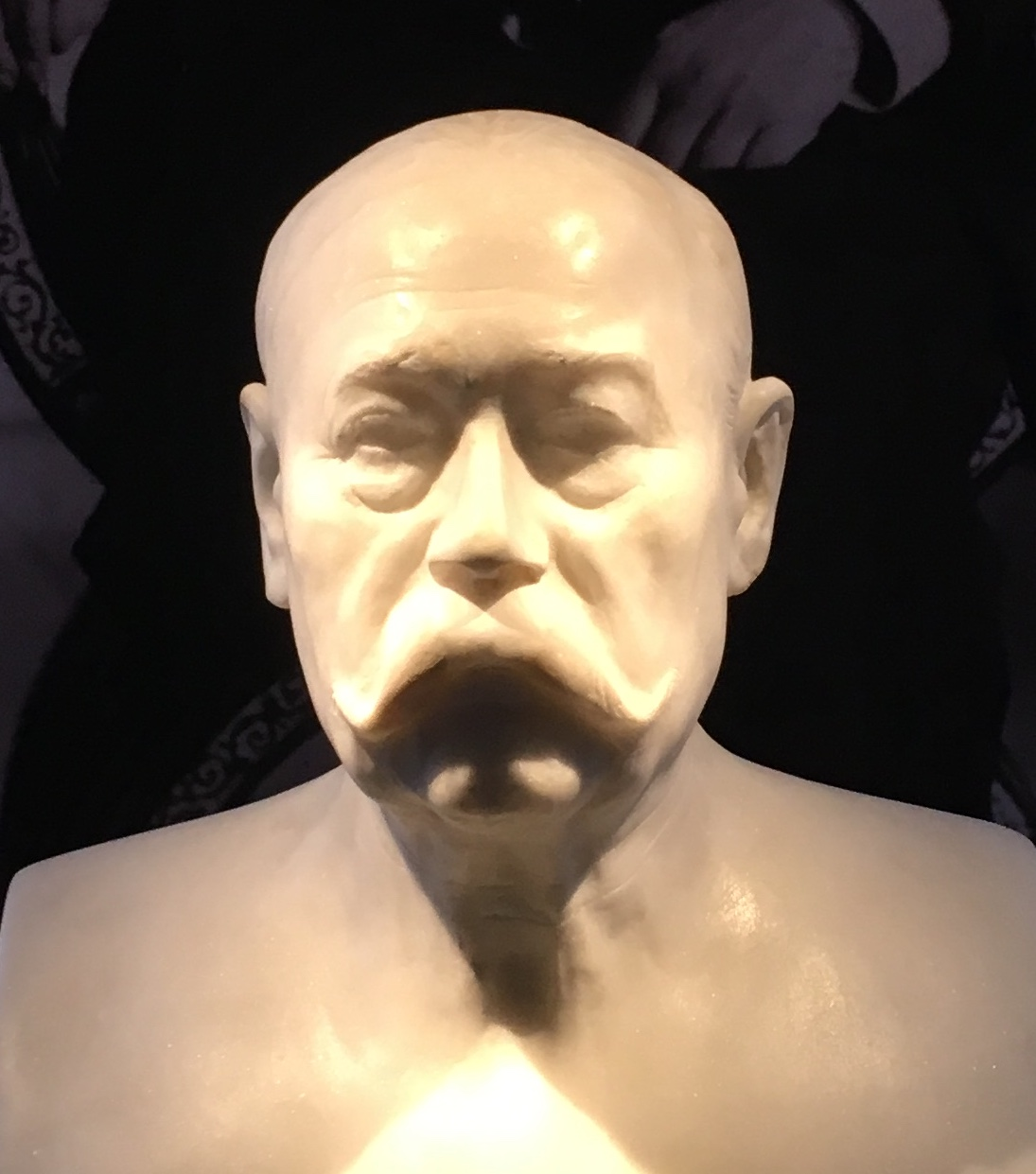
Bust of Wilhelm, Granitz Hunting Lodge

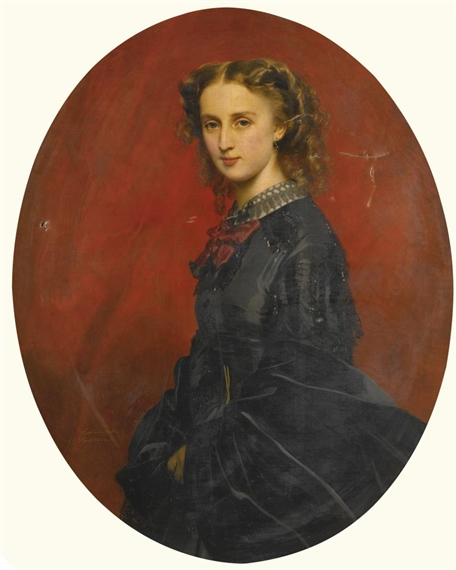
Portrait of Wilhelm's wife , Wanda Maria Baroness von Veltheim-Bartensleben, painted by Franz Xaver Winterhalter in 1858

== Honours and awards ==
- Prussia:
  - Grand Cross of the Order of the Red Eagle.
  - Commander of the Royal House Order of Hohenzollern.
  - Knight of Honour of the Order of Saint John, (Bailiwick of Brandenburg).
  - Iron Cross 2nd Class (1870).
- Bavaria:
  - Grand Cross of the Military Merit Order.
- Sweden-Norway:
  - Commander of the Order of Vasa.
- Mecklenburg-Schwerin:
  - Grand Cross of the Order of the Wendish Crown,

=== Arms ===
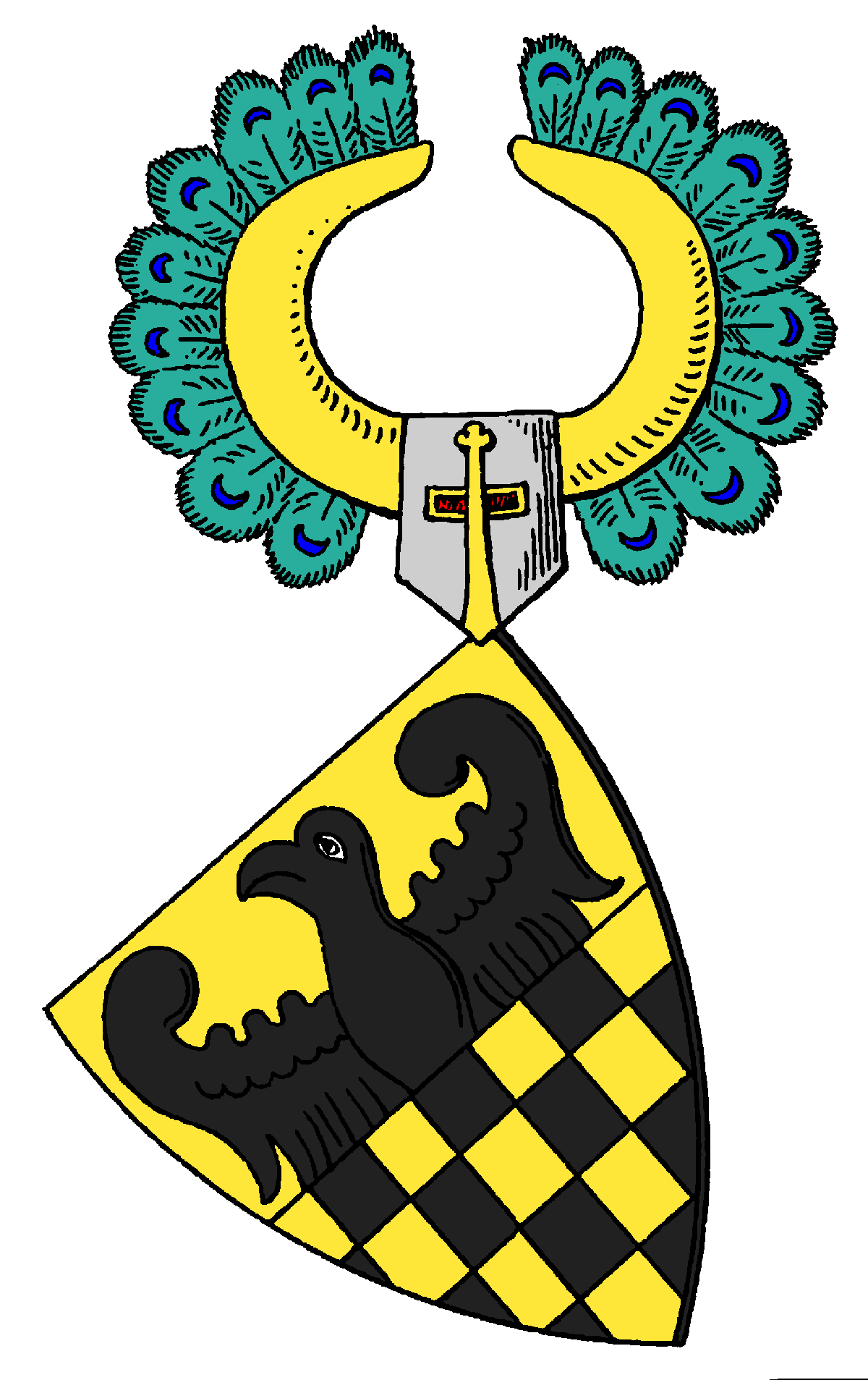
Coat of arms of the ancient Putbus family.

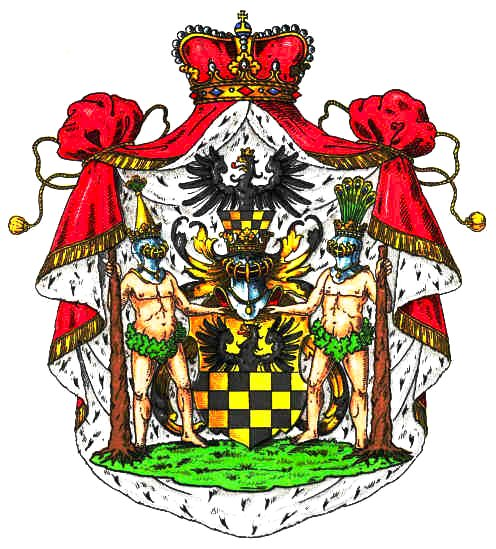
Coat of arms of Wilhelm as Prince of Rügen.

== Buildings ==
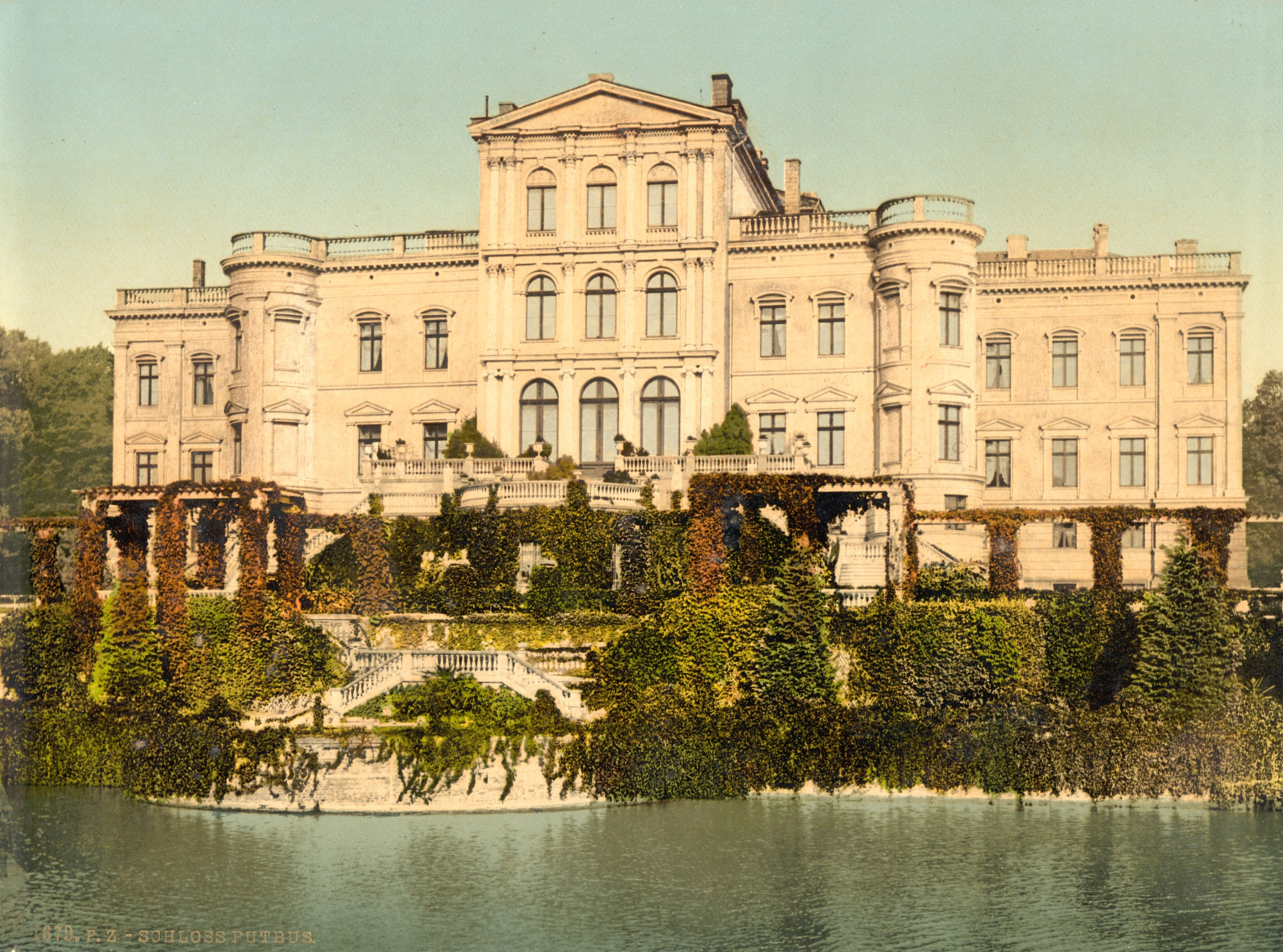
Putbus Palace (around 1900; demolished in 1962)

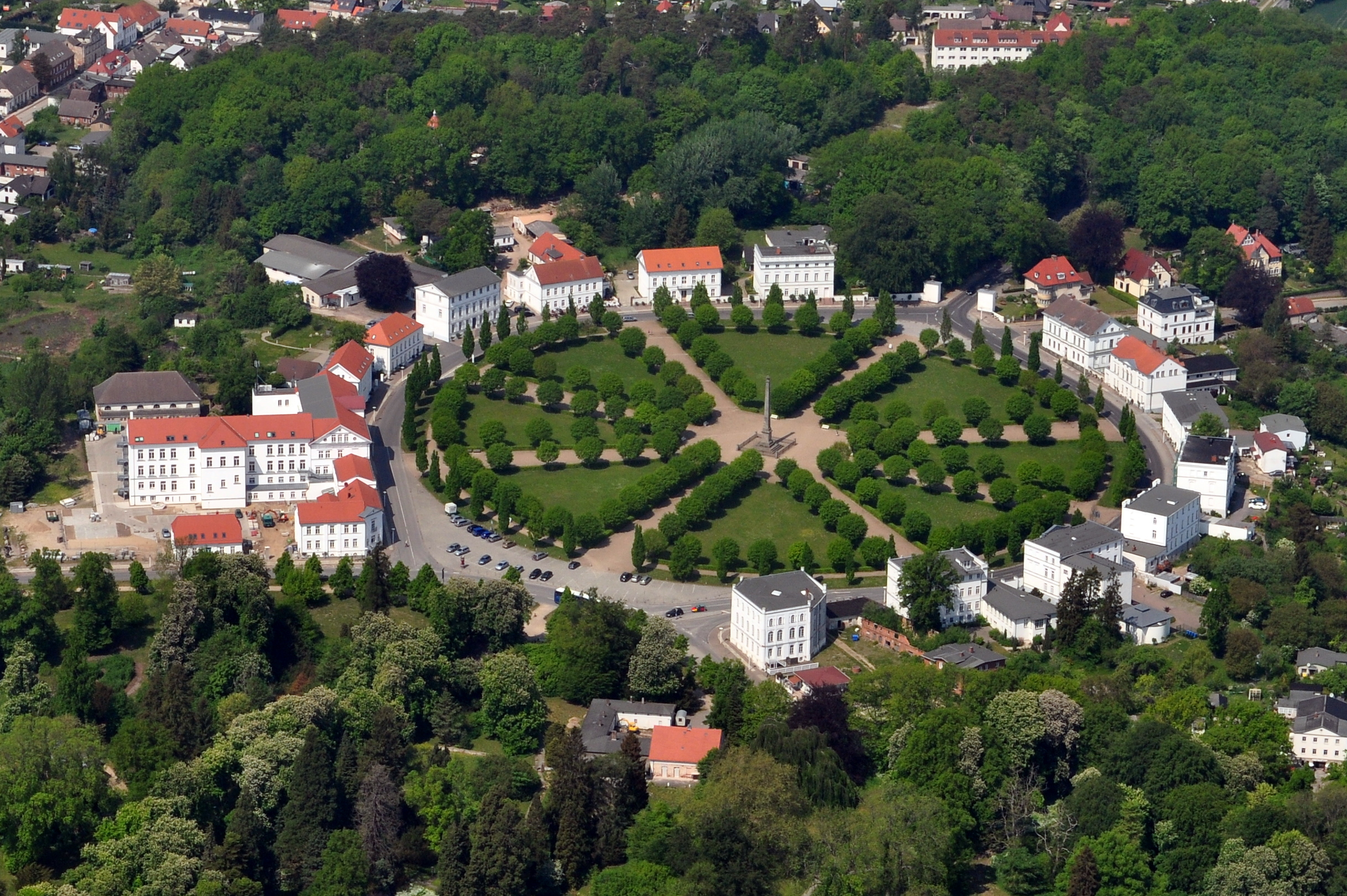
Putbus Circus, residence of officials and administration, with the empty former location of the palace, bottom left

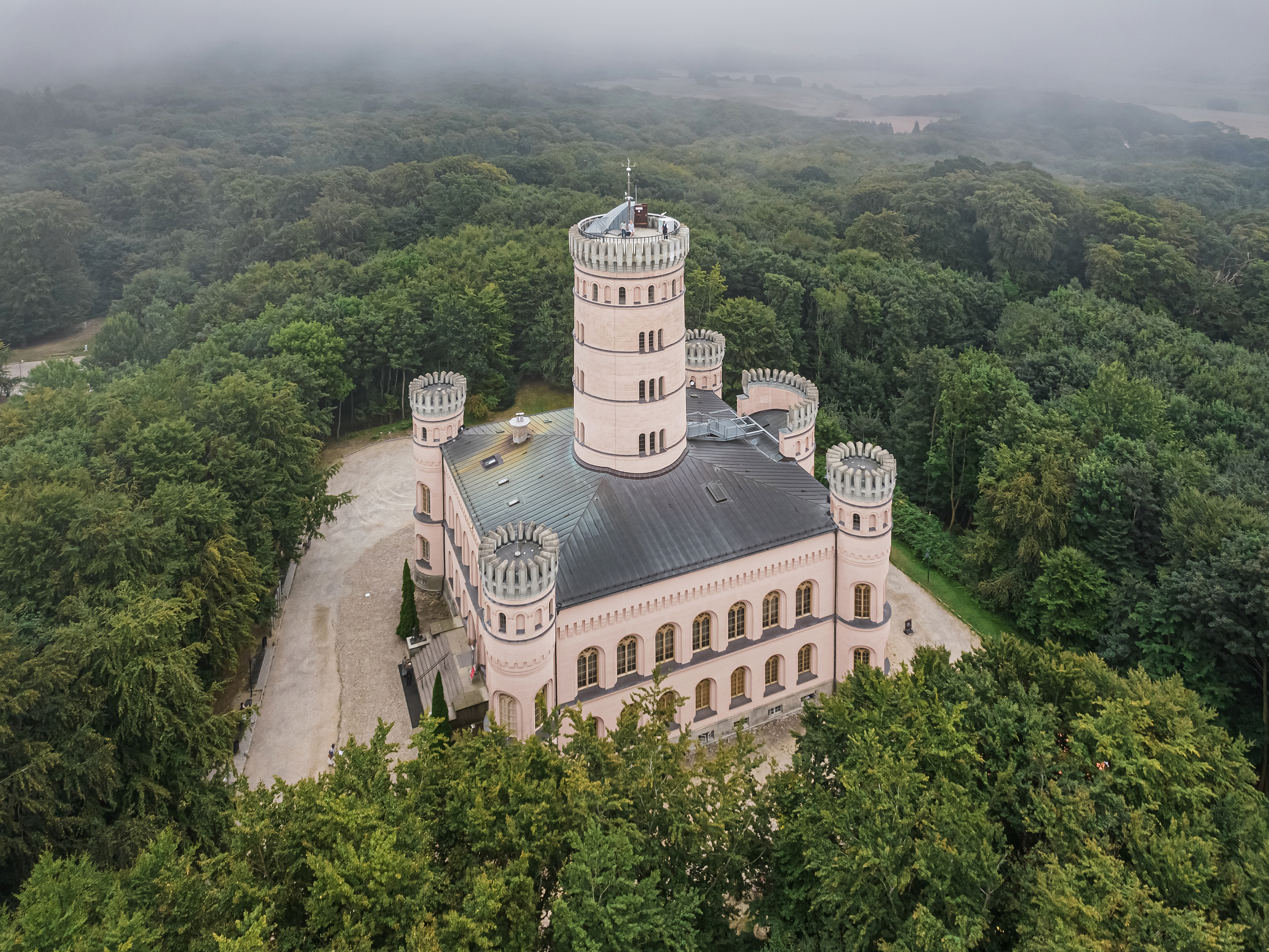
Granitz Hunting Lodge

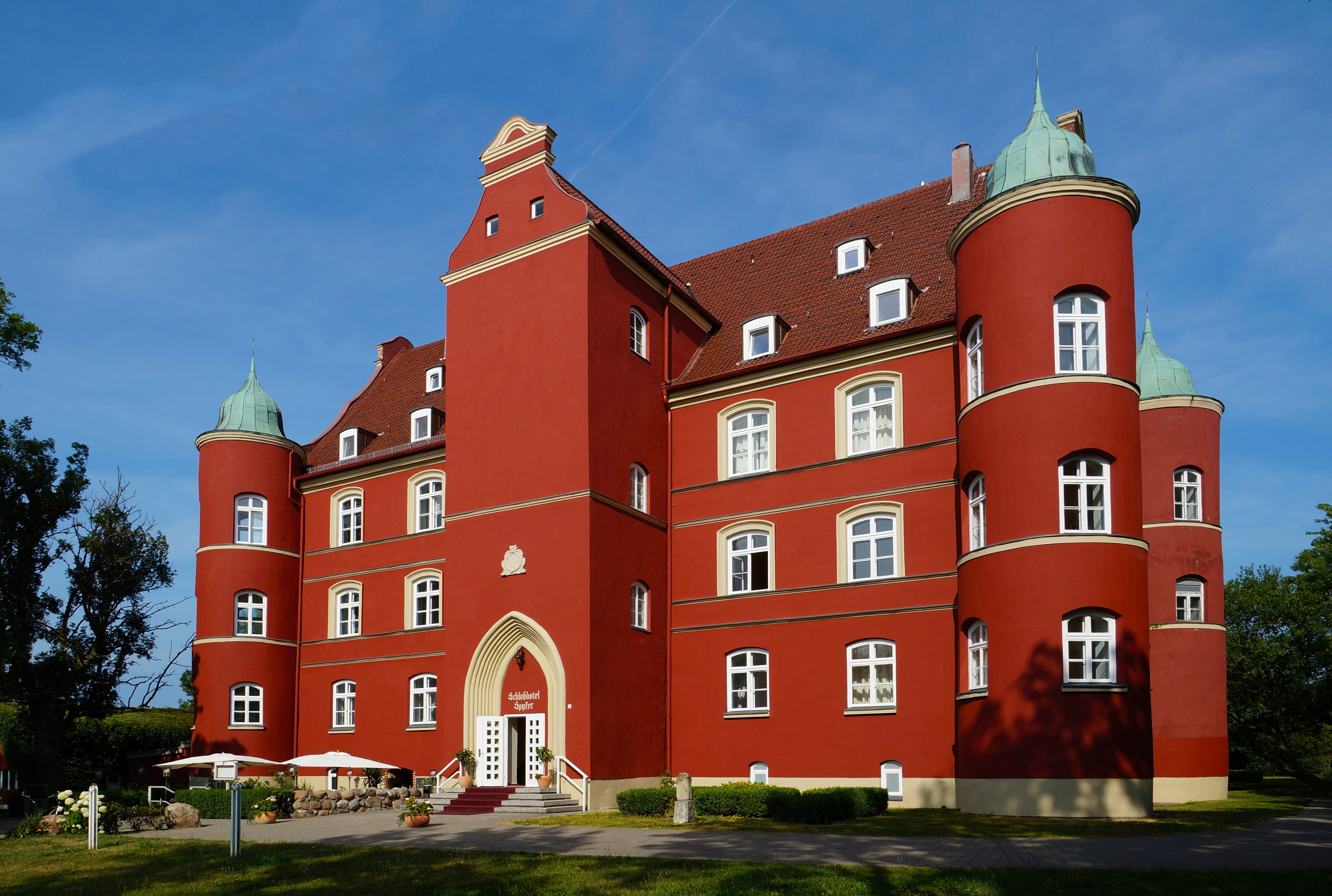
Spycker Castle, Rügen (acquired in 1817)
