= Putbus Palace =

Former palace on the isle of Rügen in Germany

Coordinates: 54.3503°N 13.4709°E

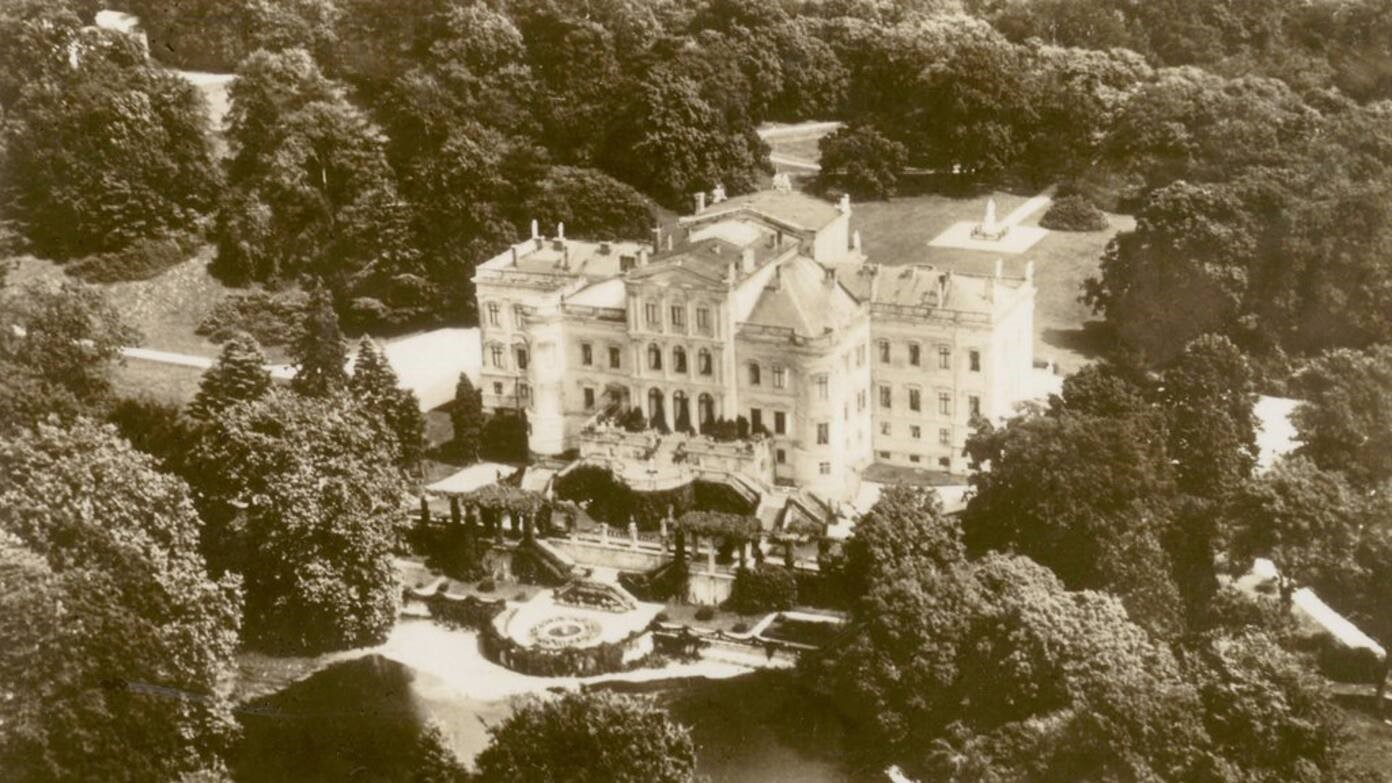
Schloss Putbus from the air

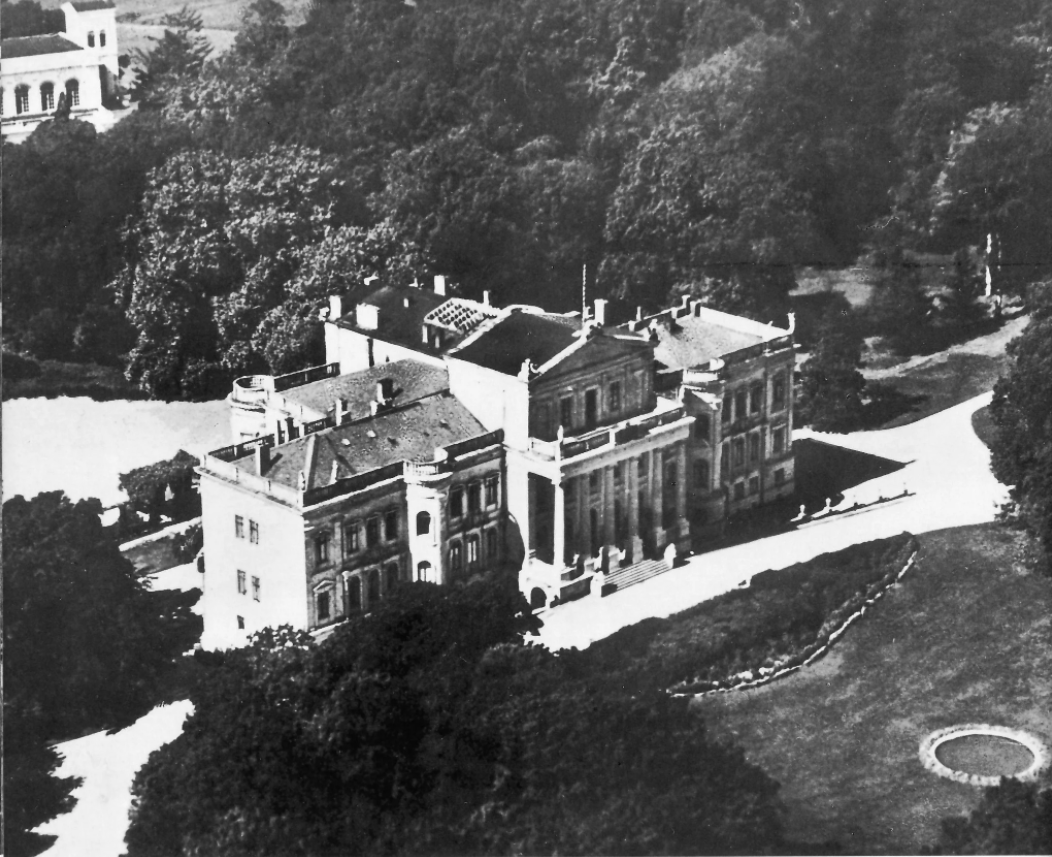
Schloss Putbus

Putbus Palace (German: Schloss Putbus) is a former neoclassical palace in Putbus, on the isle of Rügen in Germany. It was the seat of the princes of Putbus and the Putbus family in the city they founded in 1810, Putbus, which is also known as the White city of Rügen. During the communist period in East Germany, the palace was demolished in 1962 due to political reasons, and the remains were removed by 1964.

Today, the outline of the building in the green space and the lakeside terrace are still visible. In 2019, an association was founded for the reconstruction of the palace. A feasibility study was presented in November 2023, and the association is now raising public awareness and raising funding.

Putbus palace is also known as the palace behind the elderberry grove (German: Das Schloss hinter dem Holunderbusch).

== History ==
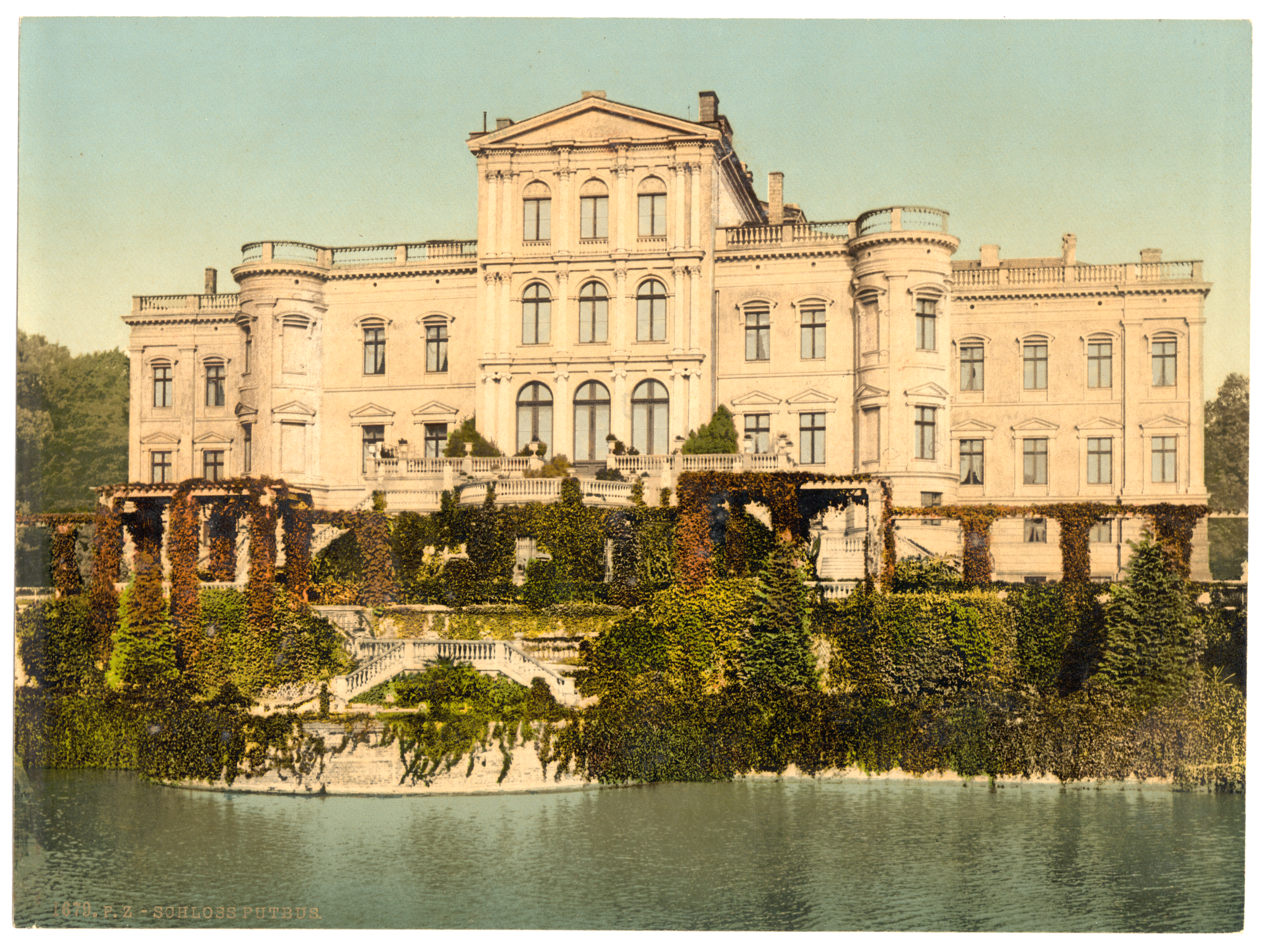
Schloss Putbus - Lakeside

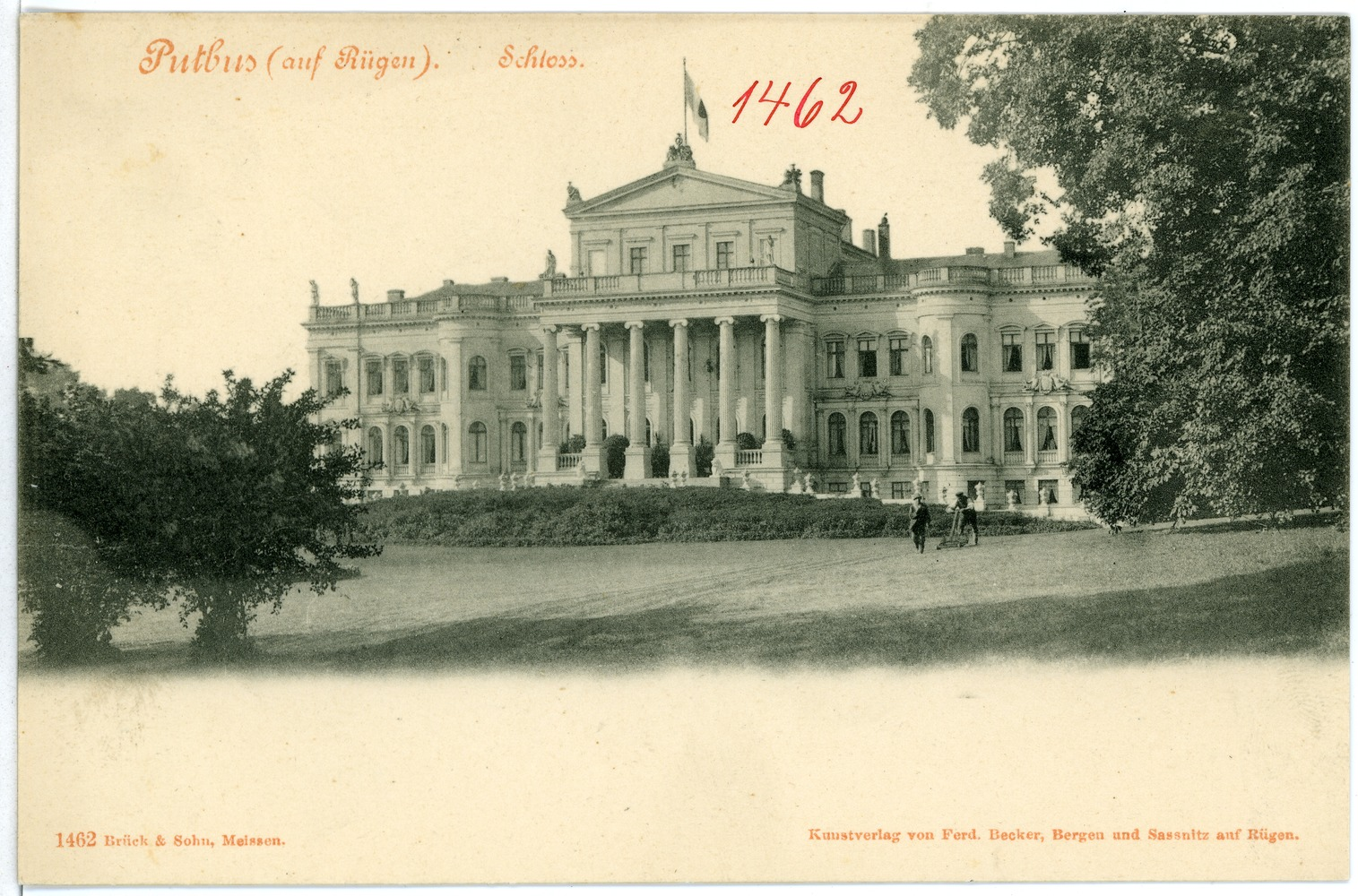
Schloss Putbus - Front

=== Middle ages ===
The first stronghold at Putbus was already there around 1200, in the times when Rügen was a Danish principality, ruled by the Wends. The Putbus family was a collateral line of the princely house. The name Putbus first appeared in 1286 and was adopted by all members of the family in the mid-14th century. With the extinction of the princes of Rügen in 1325, the family gained a leading role among the noble families of Rügen. They became the largest land owners on the island of Rügen, which they remained until the communist takeover after the Second World War.

They choose the Putbus stronghold as their main seat and constructed there a stone house, which was mentioned multiple times in documents from around 1371. It was a rectangular solid building located exactly in the middle of an area enclosed by a moat.

The documented designation of the building changed in 1416 from "house" to "castle”. In the 15th century, the castle was rebuilt in Gothic style. Between 1584 and 1594, Ludwig von Putbus added the southwestern wing to castle.

=== 17th and 18th centuries ===
At the start of the 17th century, the castle was rebuilt into a three-winged complex. The lords of Putbus were created counts of Holy Roman Empire in 1727, and counts in Sweden in 1731.

In 1725, count Moritz Ulrich von Putbus (1699–1769) renewed the castle in baroque style, with only the Gothic wing and the Renaissance part remaining. Also, he established a park in French formal style, including a belvedere (demolished around 1804/ 1805) and ice cellar (demolished in 1819).

=== 19th century: Wilhelm Malte I ===
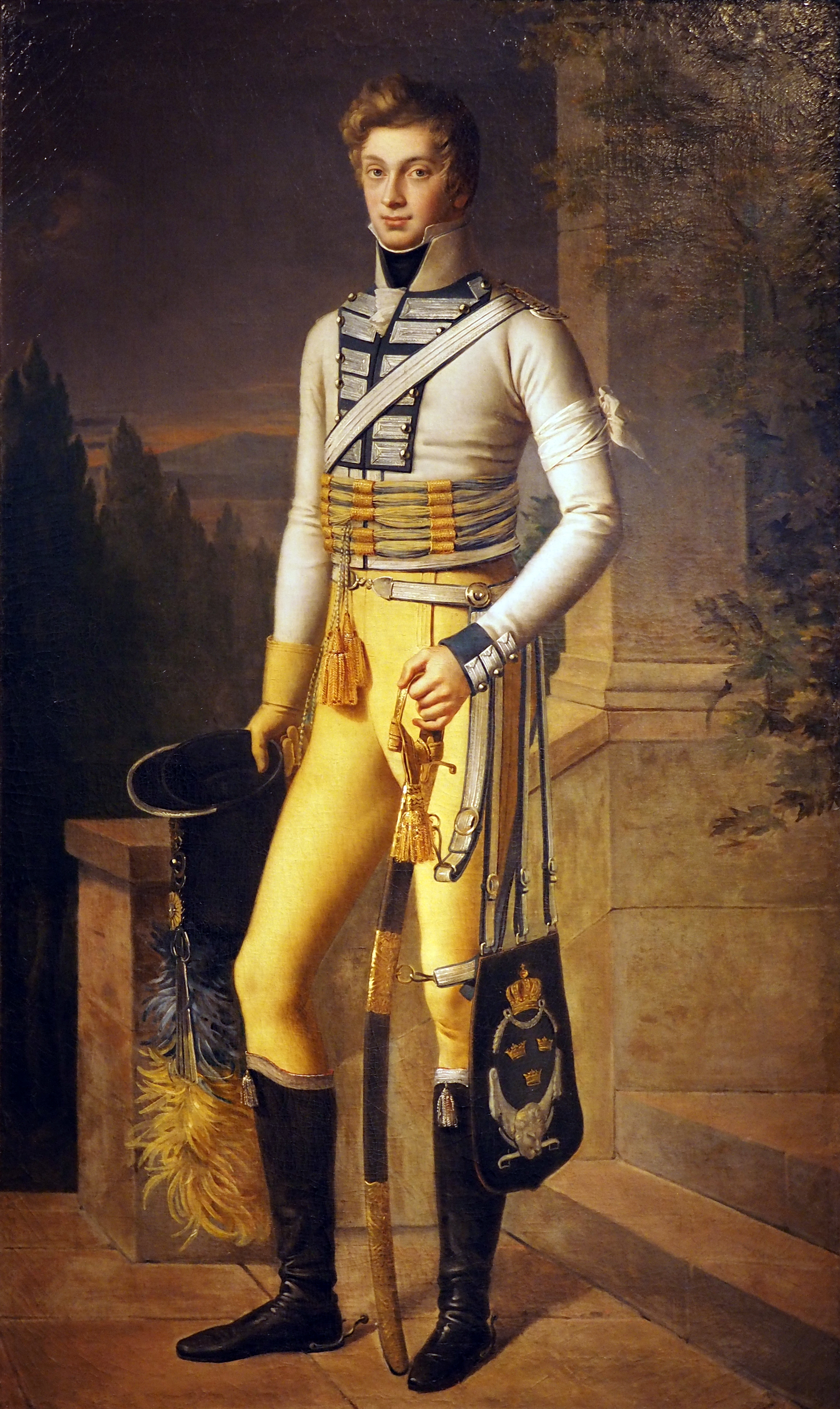
Wilhelm Malte I zu Putbus, founder of the village

In 1807, count Wilhelm Malte I von Putbus (1783–1854) was created prince (Fürst) by king Gustav IV Adolf of Sweden, Duke of Swedish Pomerania. In 1815, the Prussian king Frederick William III (1770–1840) recognized the princely title, after his assumption of power in Swedish Pomerania (now part of the Duchy of Pomerania as a province of Prussia). Wilhelm Malte I was the last governor general of the province of Swedish Pomerania before it was incorporated into the Kingdom of Prussia in 1815 as New Western Pomerania and Rügen. He had actually been picked to continue running the affairs of the province under its new rulers.

In 1810, Wilhelm Malte founded the town of Putbus next to the palace, and developed it into a luxury seaside resort like Bad Doberan and Heiligendamm. It opened in 1816. The city was designed in neoclassical style and became known as the "White Town" (German: Weiße Stadt).

From 1827 to 1832, the palace was redesigned by the Berlin architect Johann Gottfried Steinmeyer, who influenced it in the neoclassical style. In addition, from 1819 to 1821, the residence theatre was built and modified in 1826. The princely stables were built between 1821 and 1824, and were home to prince Malte's horses. The palace church was created between 1844 and 1846. And finally, from 1824 to 1853, the prince also constructed an orangery near the palace.

The park was also transformed into an English landscape garden. English landscape gardens, as a conscious contrast to the previously dominant French-style baroque gardens, were very popular in Germany towards the end of the 18th and throughout the 19th century. The orchestrated park landscape of trees, bushes, flowers, meadows, water surfaces, paths, and squares was intended to represent an alternative world to the usual harsh reality. The prince resided in Berlin during the winter from 1816 onwards and was also inspired by the ideas of Prussian parks. In 1823, he became a member of the Association for the Promotion of Horticulture in the Royal Prussian States of Prussia (short: Berlin Horticultural Association).

Wilhelm Malte I also constructed the nearby located Granitz Hunting Lodge.

==== Gallery: Putbus palace in the 18th and 19th centuries ====
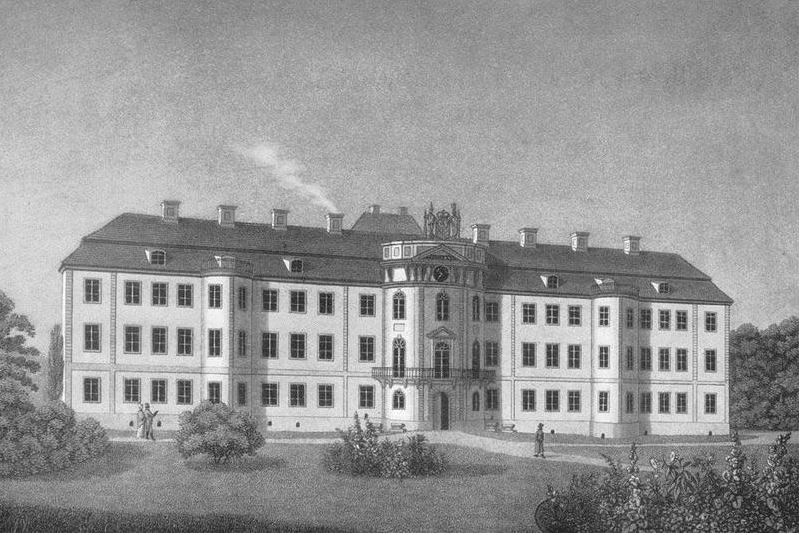
The 18th century Putbus Palace

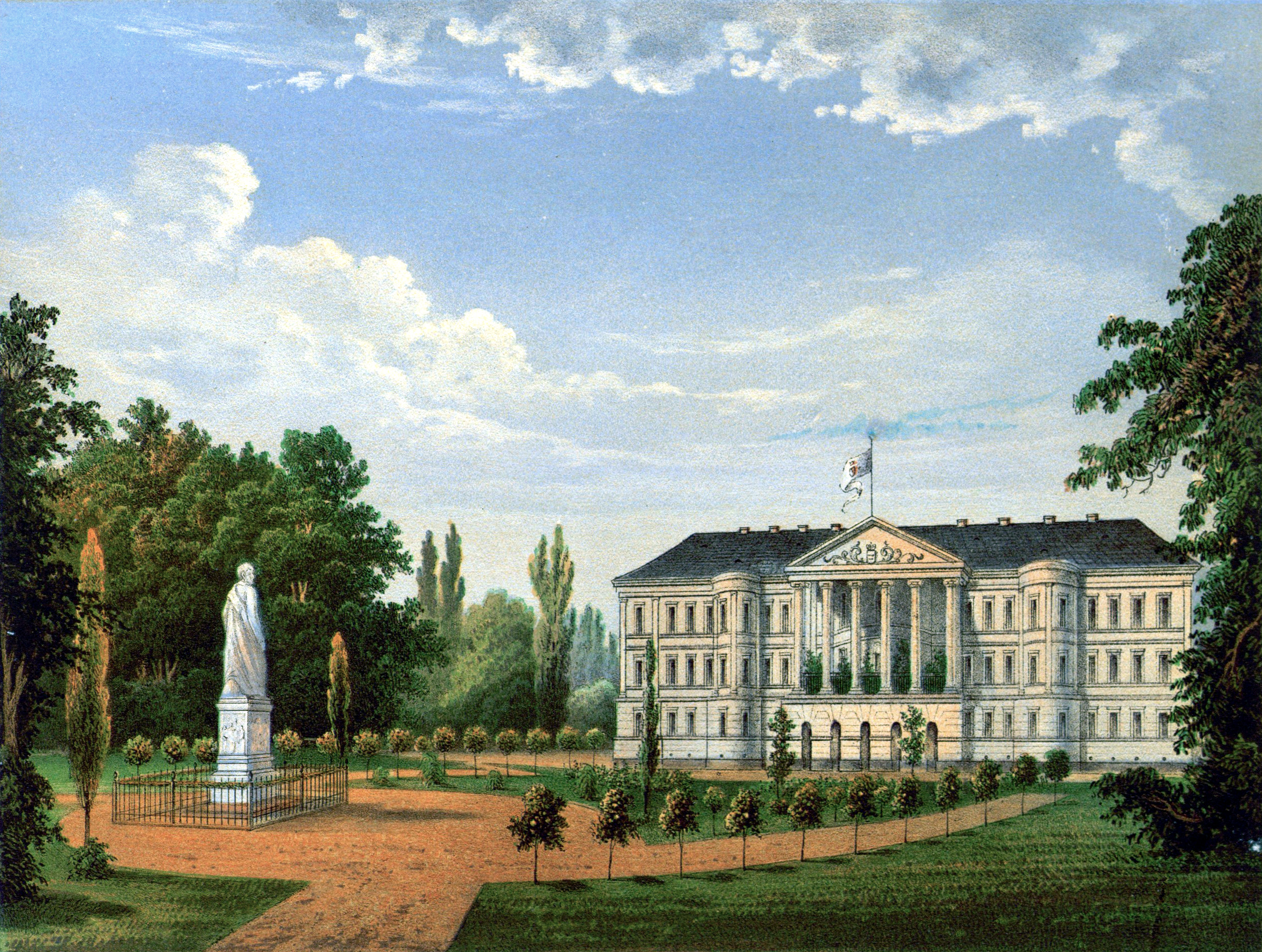
The neoclassical Schloss Putbus by Alexander Duncker around 1860

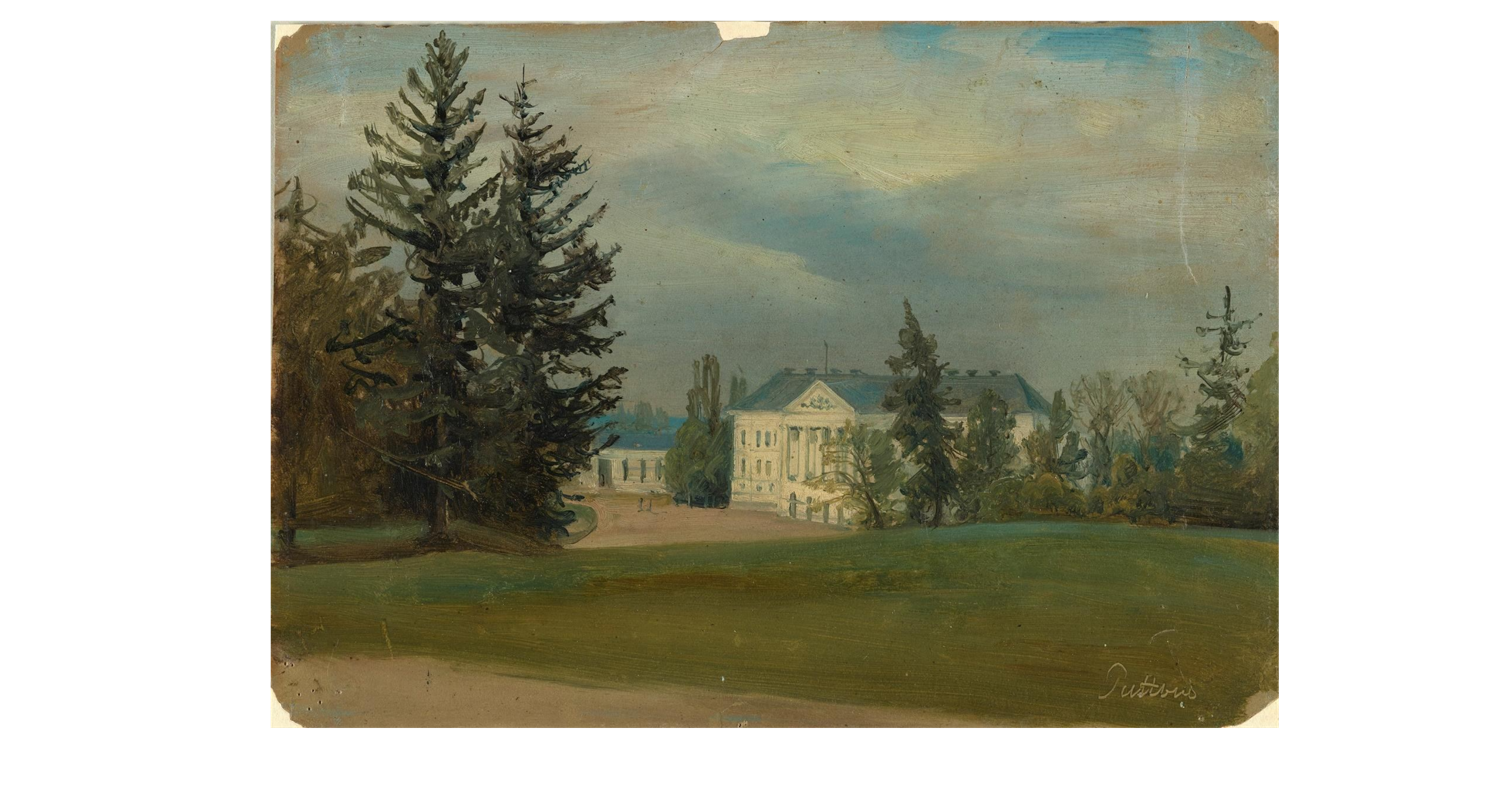
Schloss Putbus around 1850

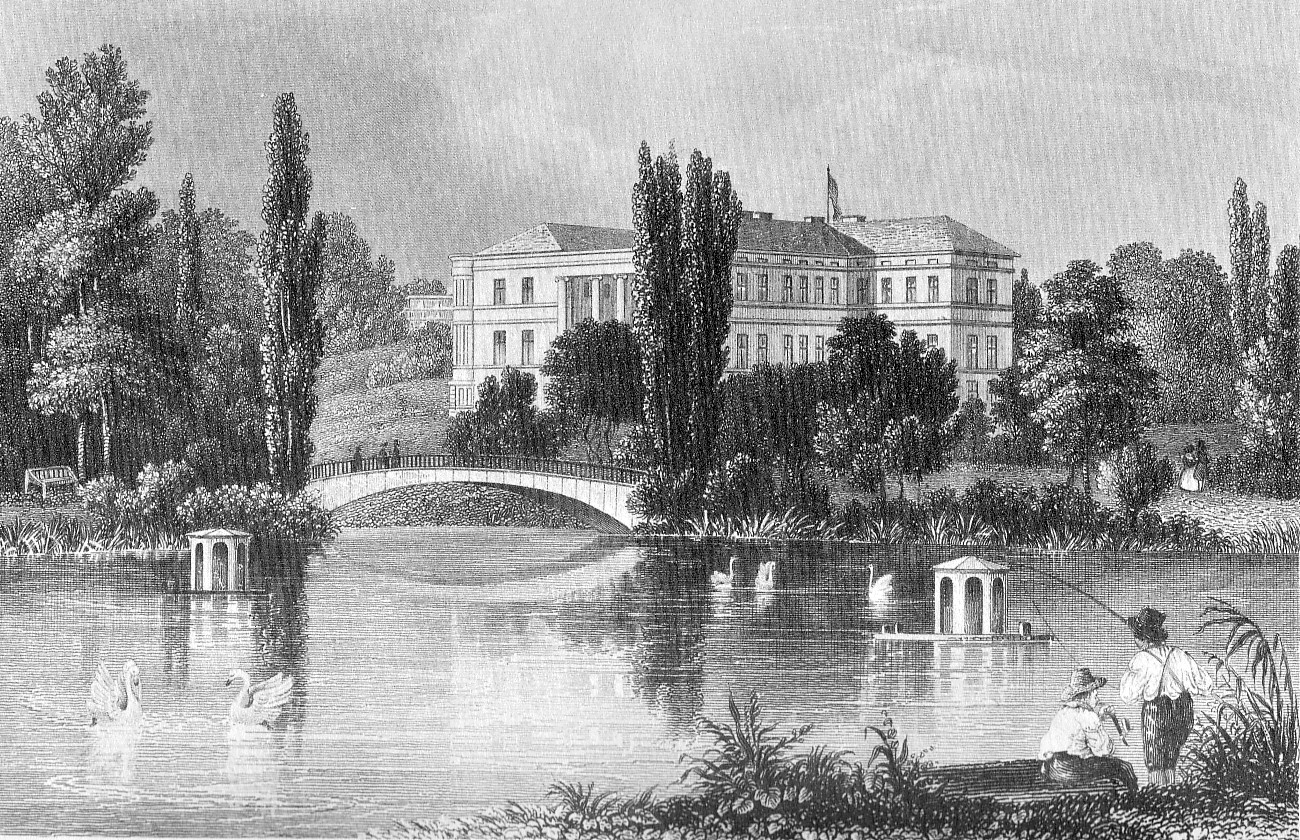
Schloss Putbus around 1850

=== 19th century: Wilhelm Malte II ===
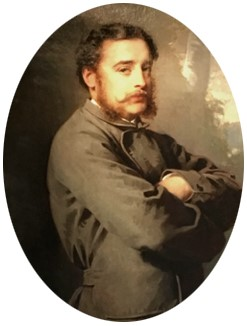
Wilhelm Malte II zu Putbus

After the death of Prince Wilhelm Malte on 26 September 1854, the House of Putbus went extinct in the male line. In 1861 by decision of king Wilhelm I of Prussia the succession to the house of Putbus was passed down to Wilhelm Malte II (1833–1907) and he was given the title of Prince (Fürst) of Putbus. Wilhelm Malte II was the grandson of Wilhelm Malte I through his daughter Clothilde von Putbus (1809–1894), who was married to count Hermann Friedrich von Wylich und Lottum (1796–1849).

A fire – probably caused by a later installed hot air heating system – destroyed large parts of the new castle on 23 December 1865. The Berlin architect J. Pavelt was chosen for the reconstruction, which was completed in 1872 in the Neoclassical style. The central courtyard was demolished, and a hall was created, followed by a terraced area at the rear, staggered six times towards the Swan Pond. This also led to the loss of the last remnants of the medieval "Stone House".

There were close relations between the Prussian royal house and the Putbus family. King Frederick William IV visited the princely residence as crown prince in 1820, 1825 and in 1843, 1846, and 1853 as king. The close ties between Putbus and Berlin were further strengthened under Wilhelm Malte II in 1860, still under the reign of Princess Luise, Crown Prince Frederick and his wife Victoria visited the princely palace in Putbus.

==== Gallery: Putbus palace around 1900 ====
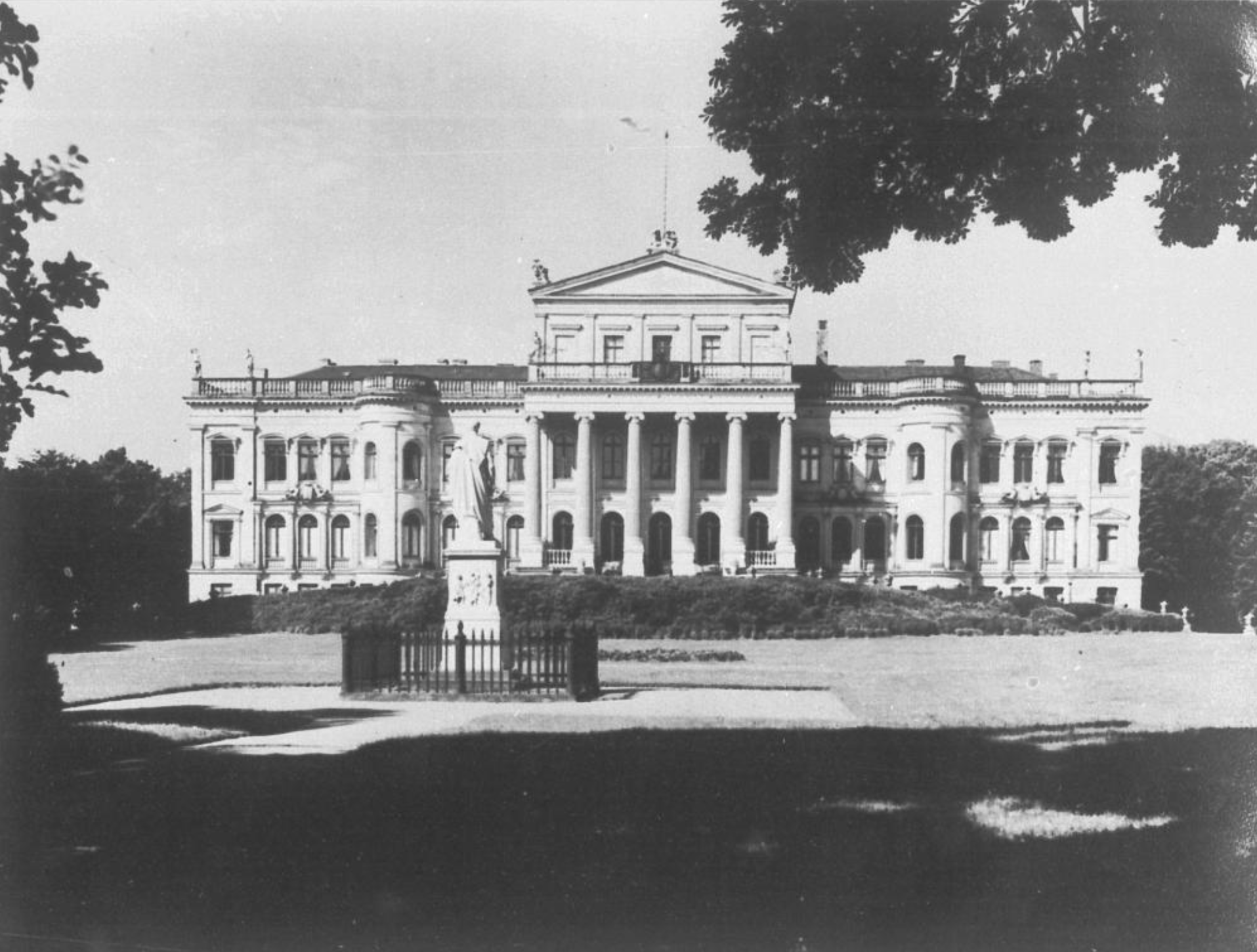
Front of Schloss Putbus with monument for prince Wilhem Malte I

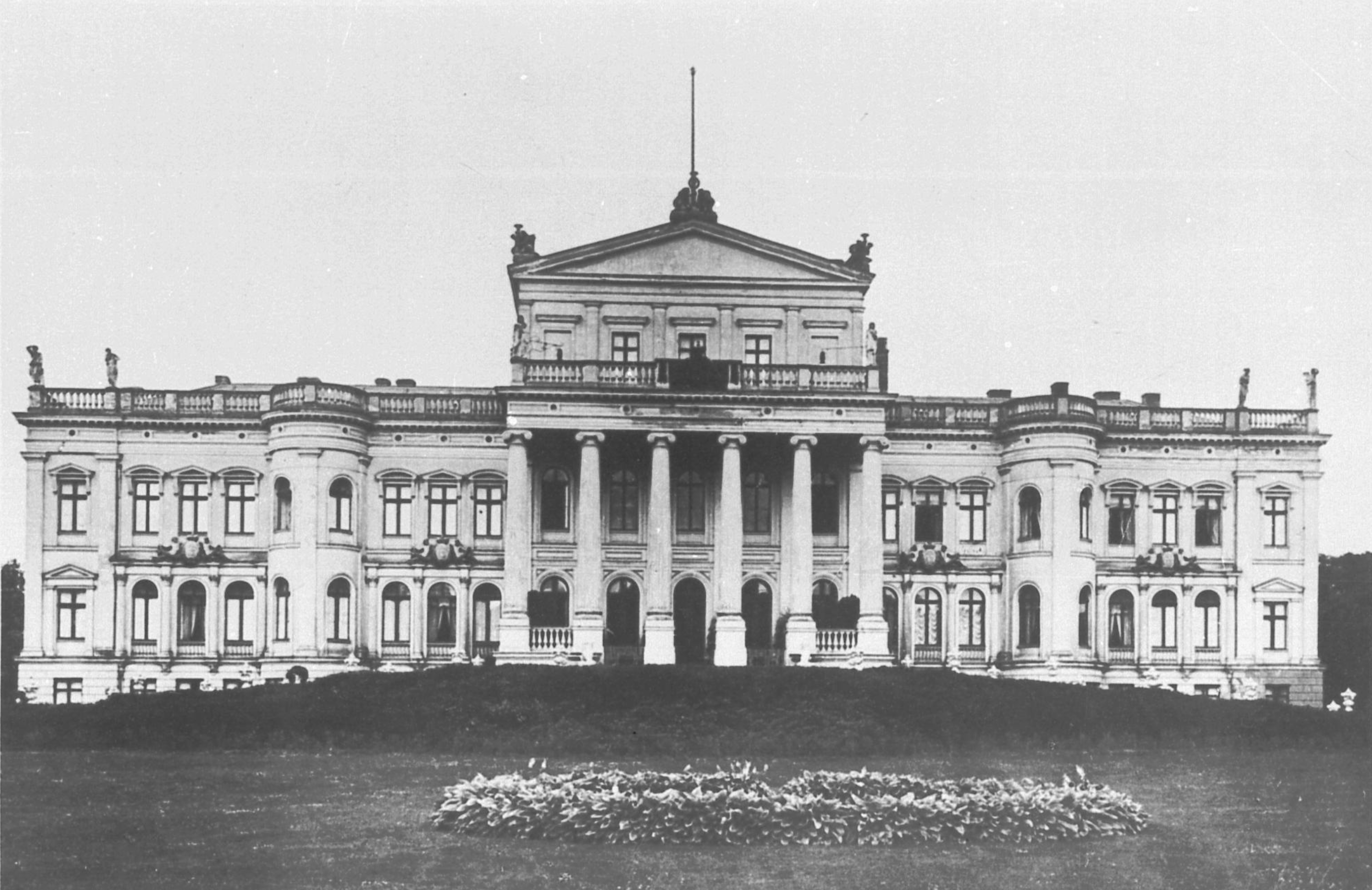
Front of Schloss Putbus

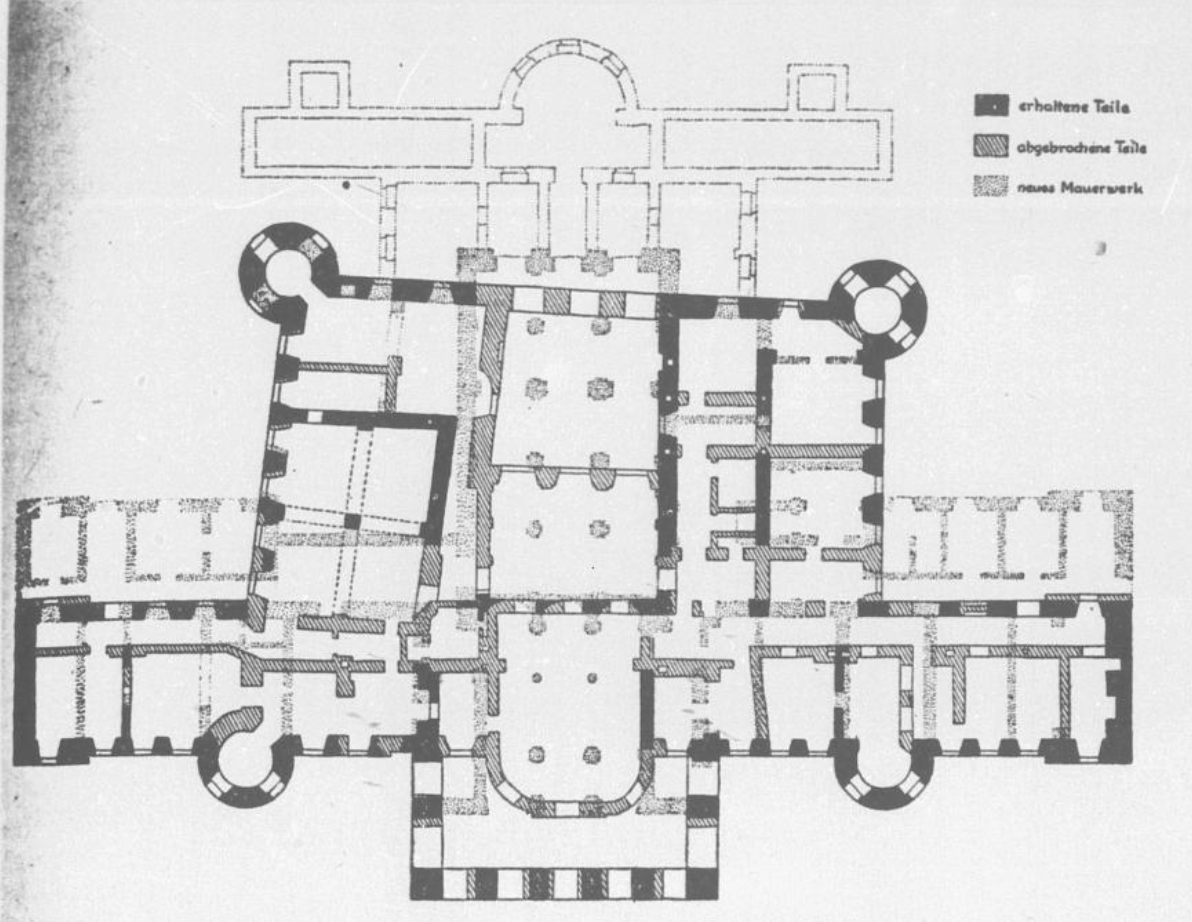
Plan of Schloss Putbus by Pavelt (1865)

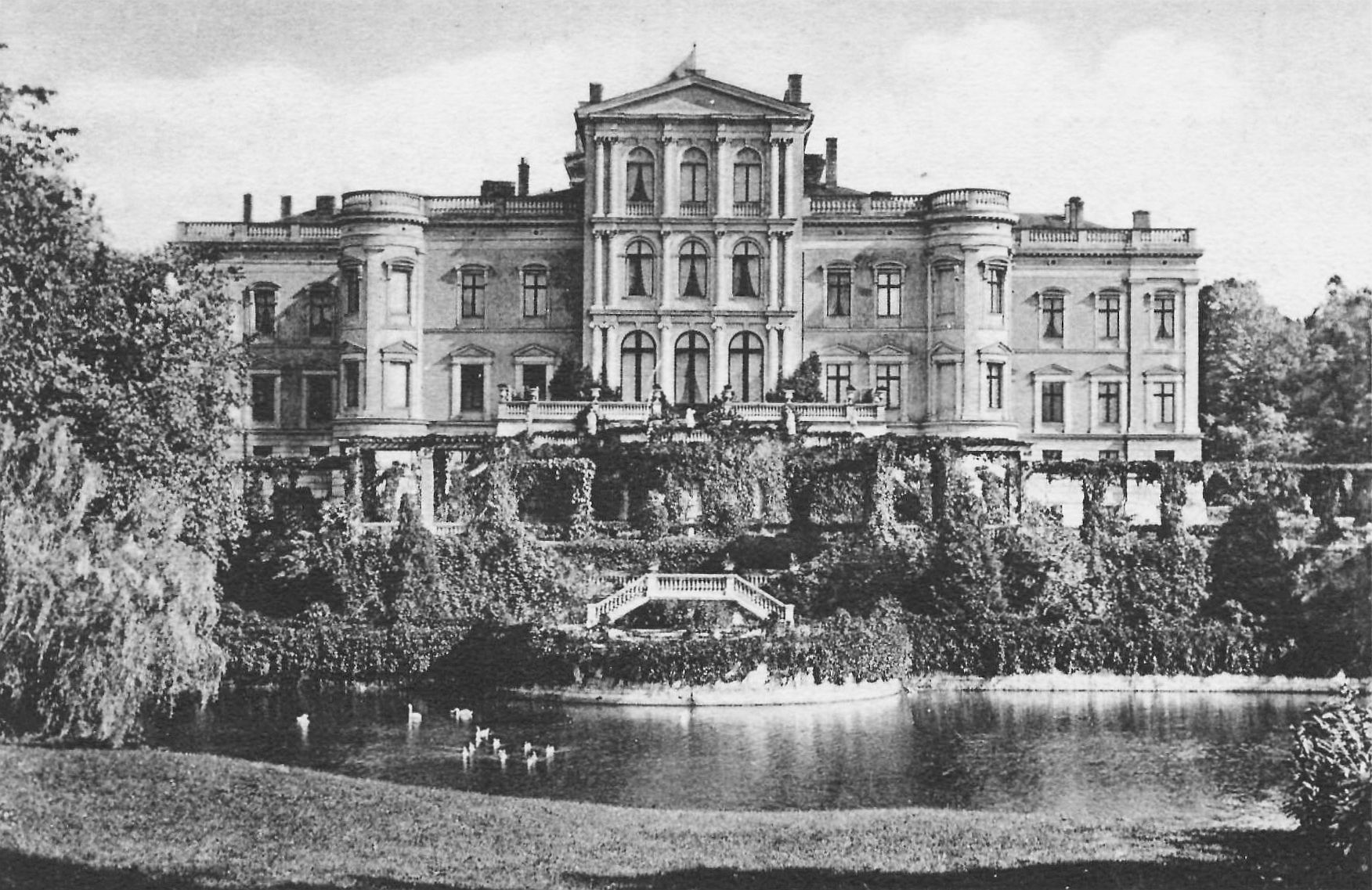
Schloss Putbus in 1922

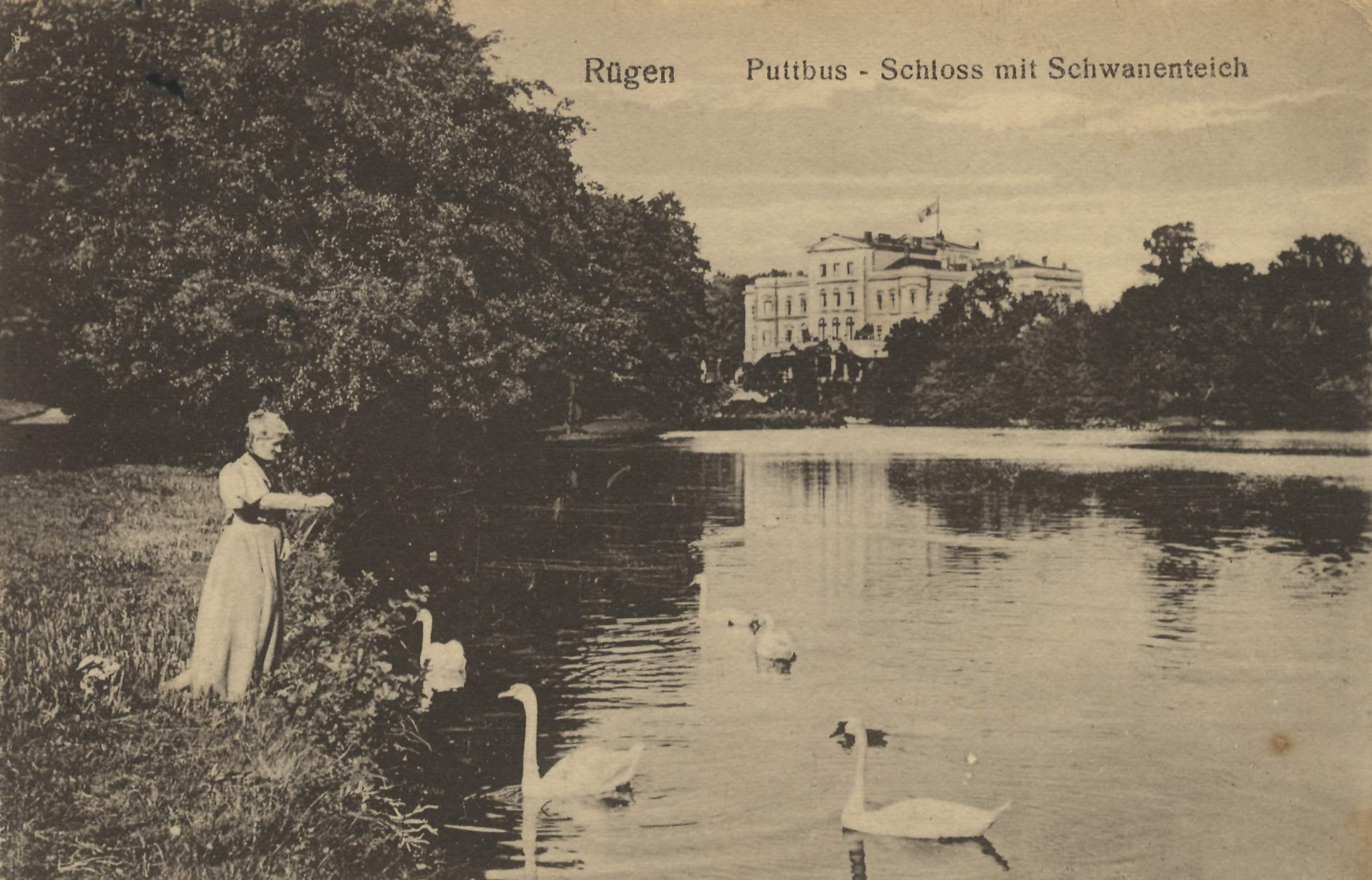
Schloss Putbus with the swan pond

=== Second World War ===
Until 1944, the palace was owned and lived in by the Putbus family, and was also centre of the princely administration, but it was placed under forced administration by the NSDAP after the imprisonment of Malte, the 5th prince of Putbus (1889–1945) for his involvement in the 20 July plot, the assassination attempt on Hitler. He was killed in the Sachsenhausen concentration camp on 10 February 1945.

With the end of World War II, looting occurred, and as there was no immediate use planned, material removal and decay began.

=== East Germany ===
The communist government in East Germany confiscated the palace and the estate that extended over a sixth of the island of Rügen.

In 1948, artists from the Berlin-Weißensee Art Academy, with Werner Laux, worked in the palace. From 2 November 1948, Studio 48 of the State Drama School Schwerin under the direction of Heinz Kahlow was added. With the final examinations in spring 1951, as part of the reorganization of drama schools in East Germany, the branch in Putbus palace was closed.

In 1955, there was an attempt to restore the castle in neoclassical style, but the measure was not completed. In 1957, the demolition of the palace was decided for ideological and financial reasons. The demolition was ordered by the Minister of Culture Alexander Abusch.

The building was demolished in 1962, and the remains were removed by 1964. Subsequently, the castle square was levelled, leaving only the lakeside terrace.

=== Modern times ===
From the 1990s onwards, the palace park underwent restoration. Vistas were created towards the Greifswald Bay, the swan pond was expanded and provided with an artificial island accessible via a bridge. An old beech tree was saved in the Komtessgarten. Many exotic trees have been planted in the extensive park, including more than 60 different species such as giant and primeval sequoias, cedars, yellow-flowering horse chestnuts, and tulip trees. Access to the park and wildlife enclosure is free of charge.

==== Gallery: Putbus palace grounds today ====
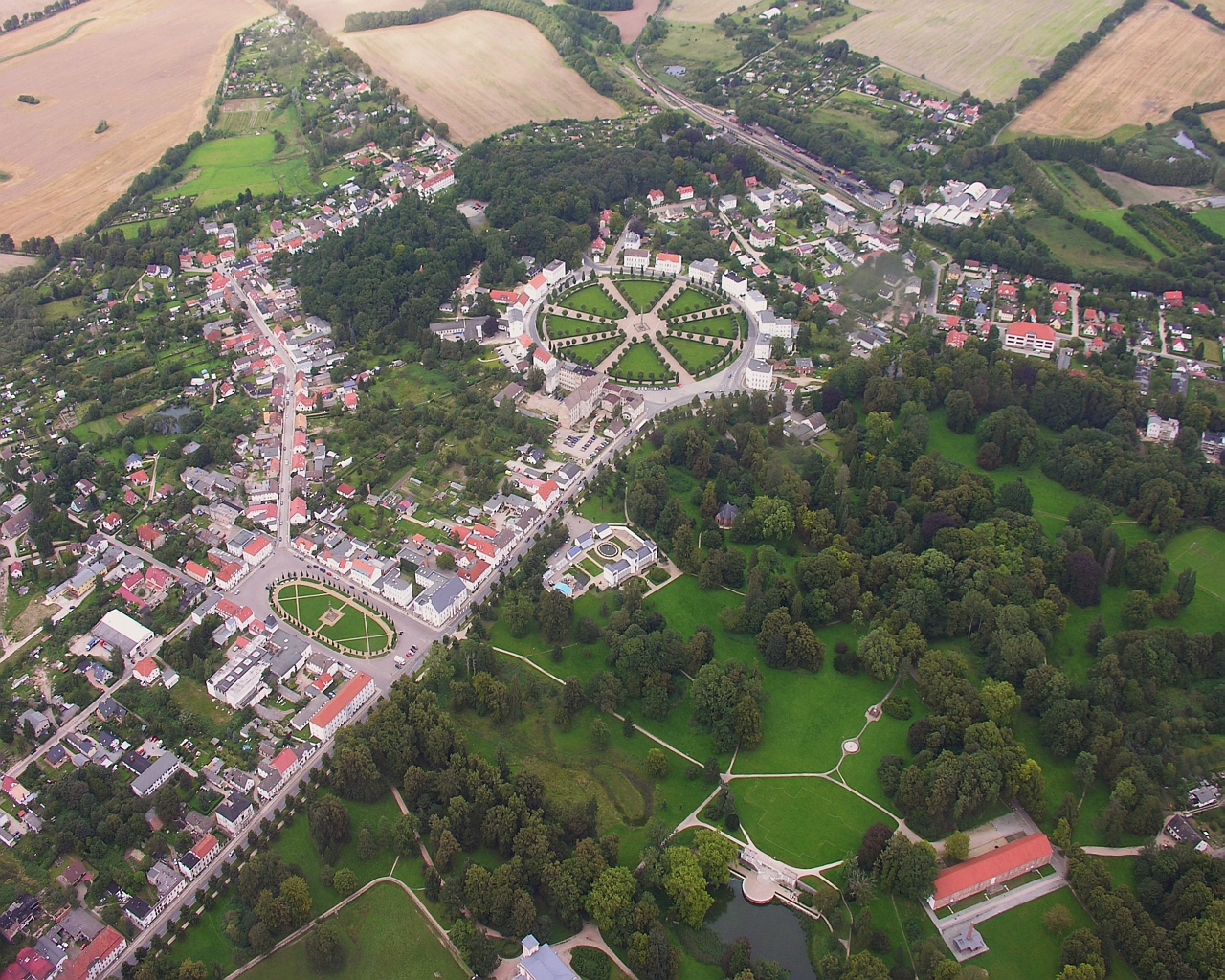
Putbus from the air, the castle would have been right below at the pond

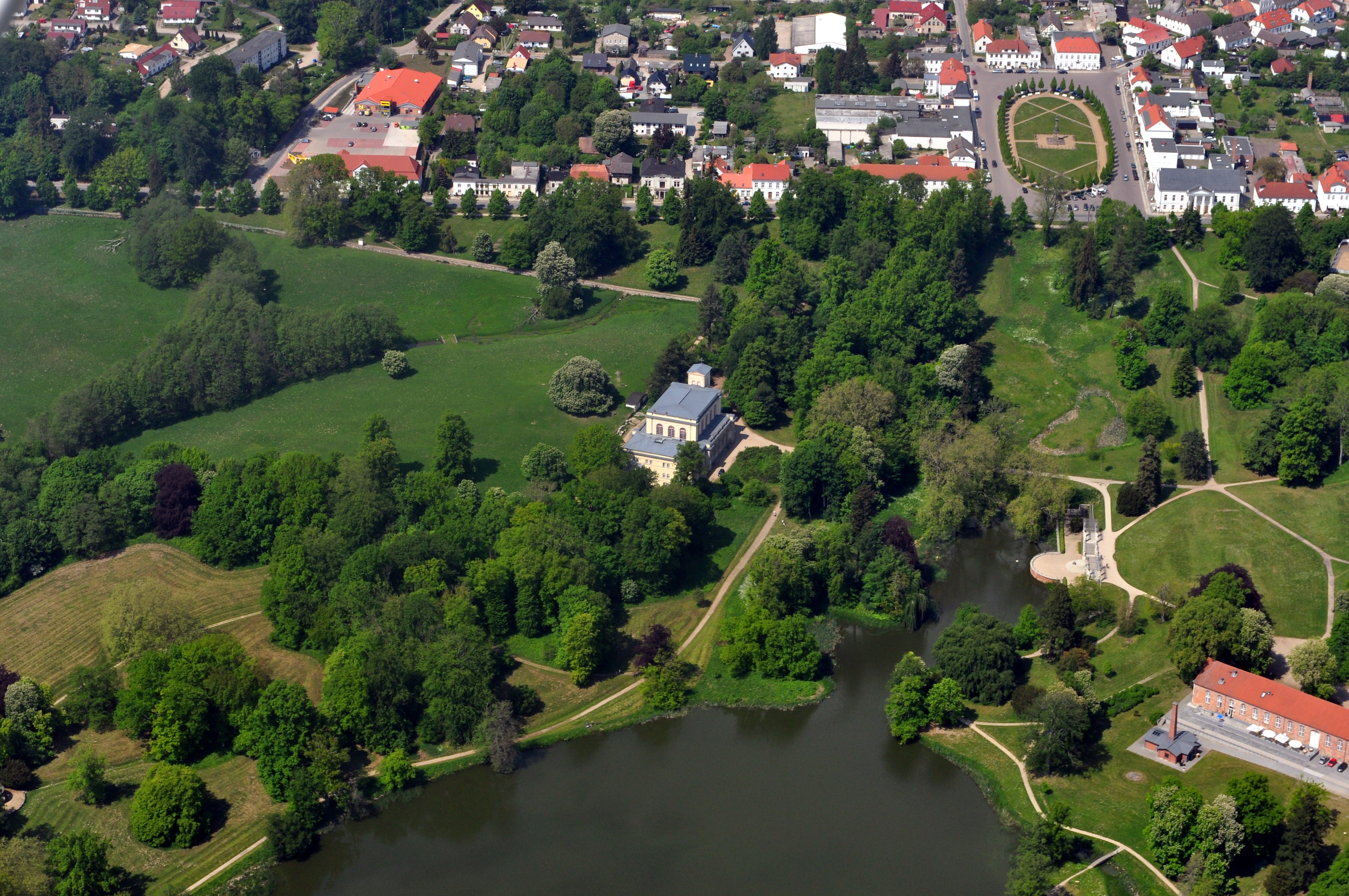
The location of Schloss Putbus from the air (on the right)

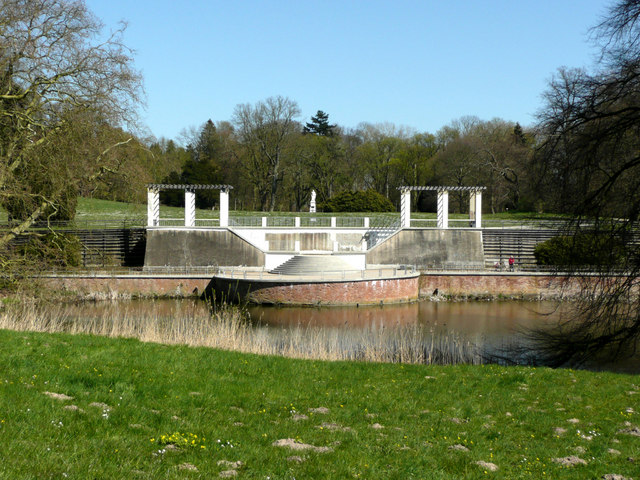
The location of Schloss Putbus in 2008

== Reconstruction plans ==
In December 2019, the ‘‘Friends of the Princely Palace of Putbus’’ association presented plans to reconstruct the palace for approximately 60 million euros. According to the association's spokesperson, Torsten Seegert, many citizens had expressed their willingness to participate in the project and pledged donations. In January 2020, a donation account was set up for this purpose In 2021, the universities of Greifswald and Vienna conducted studies on the castle square, including drone surveys of the area.

The association commissioned a feasibility study from the architects and engineers' office IPROConsult, which, according to the association, was already involved in the reconstruction of the Frauenkirche in Dresden. The state government funded the study. It was presented in November 2023, estimated reconstruction costs at 40 to 50 million euros, and suggesting to use the reconstructed palace as hotel or (government) offices.

The association is now raising public awareness and raising funding.

== Literature ==
- Loebe, Viktor (1910). Putbus. Geschichte des Schlosses und Entstehung und Entwicklung des Badeortes. Eine Festgabe zur Hundertjahrfeier der Gründung des Ortes Putbus (in German). Putbus.
- Sobotka, Bruno J. (1993). Burgen, Schlösser, Gutshäuser in Mecklenburg-Vorpommern (in German). Stuttgart: Theiss Verlag. pp. 263–265. ISBN 3-8062-1084-5.
- Farin, André (2001). Wilhelm Malte zu Putbus und seine Fürstenresidenz auf der Insel Rügen (in German). Putbus: Rügen Edition. p. 135. ISBN 3-00-008844-X.
- Vogel, Andreas (2003). Johann Gottfried Steinmeyer und Putbus (in German). Schwerin: Thomas Helms Verlag. ISBN 3-931185-82-6.
- Haider, Edgar (2006). Verlorene Pracht. Geschichten von zerstörten Bauten (in German). Hildesheim: Gerstenberg Verlag. p. 191. ISBN 978-3-8067-2949-8.
- Bruhn, Christian (2009). Das Verschwundene Schloss oder Die Kunst der Zerstörung. Eine illustrierte Zeitreise zum Gedenken an den Abriss des Schlosses zu Putbus (in German). Putbus: Museo Ausstellungs-Service. ISBN 3000258671.
- Gundlach, Heinz (2011). Das Schloss hinter dem Holunderbusch. Eine Collage über den Aufstieg und Fall des Schlosses zu Putbus auf der Insel Rügen (in German). Schwerin: Thomas Helms Verlag. ISBN 978-3-940207-64-7.
- Bock, Sabine (2022). Rügen. Burgen und Schlösser, Kirchen und Kapellen, Rittersitze und Herrenhäuser (in German). Schwerin: Thomas Helms Verlag. pp. 367–370. ISBN 978-3-940207-64-7.
