= Friedrich Albrecht Karl Herrmann, Reichsgraf von Wylich und Lottum =

Friedrich Albrecht Karl Herrmann, Reichsgraf von Wylich und Lottum (20 April 1720 – 3 March 1797) was a Prussian officer.

Friedrich von Wylich was born in Anklam, Western Pomerania, as the second son of Major General Johann Christoph von Wylich und Lottum, whose father was the Field Marshal Philipp Karl von Wylich und Lottum.

Von Wylich began his military career in 1737; he was involved in all wars and battles under Frederick the Great and rose to the rank of General of Cavalry in 1794 before retiring in 1795. He received the order Pour le Mérite for his bravery in the Battle of Zorndorf in 1758 during the Seven Years' War.

He was married to Sophie Beate von Schlichting (8 August 1736 – 28 October 1801) and the couple had seven children. At the age of 76 years, von Wylich died in Berlin.
