= House of Putbus =

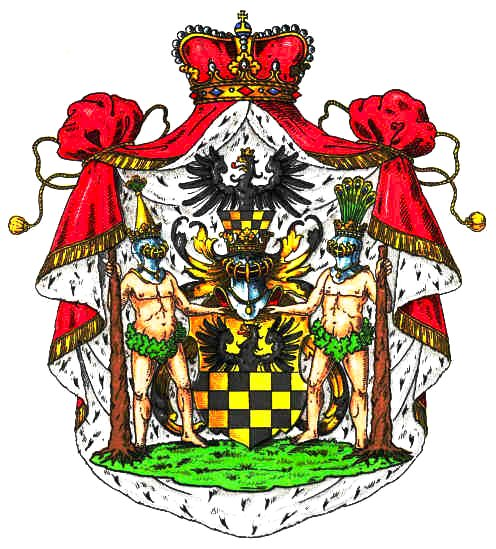
Arms of Princes of Putbus

The House of Putbus, Pedebuz or Podebusk was a German noble family of high nobility, ultimately princely house in Pomerania, mainly on the island of Rügen, territories in northern Europe on the south Baltic Sea coast.

== History ==
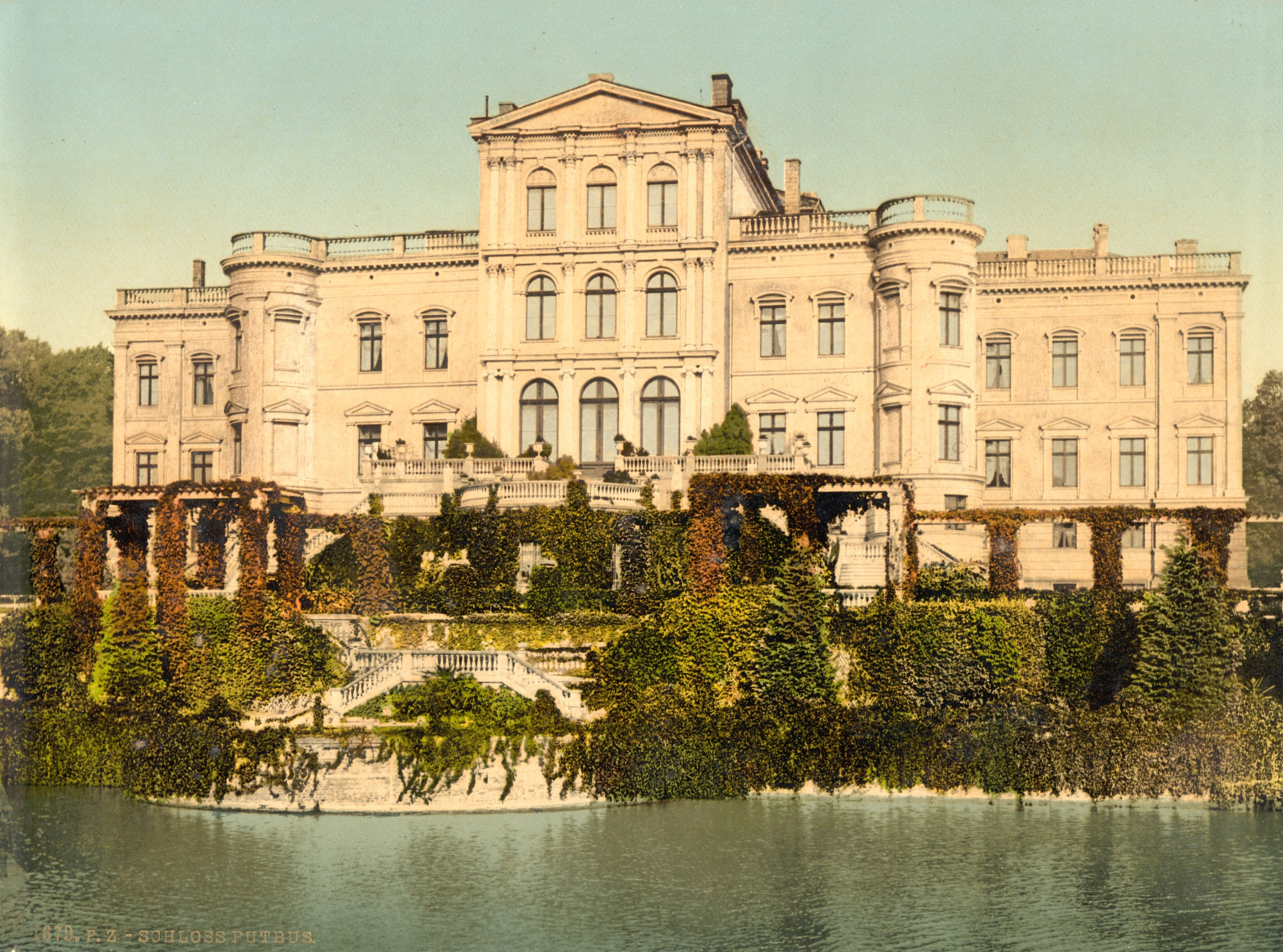
The former Putbus Palace around 1900, demolished in 1962

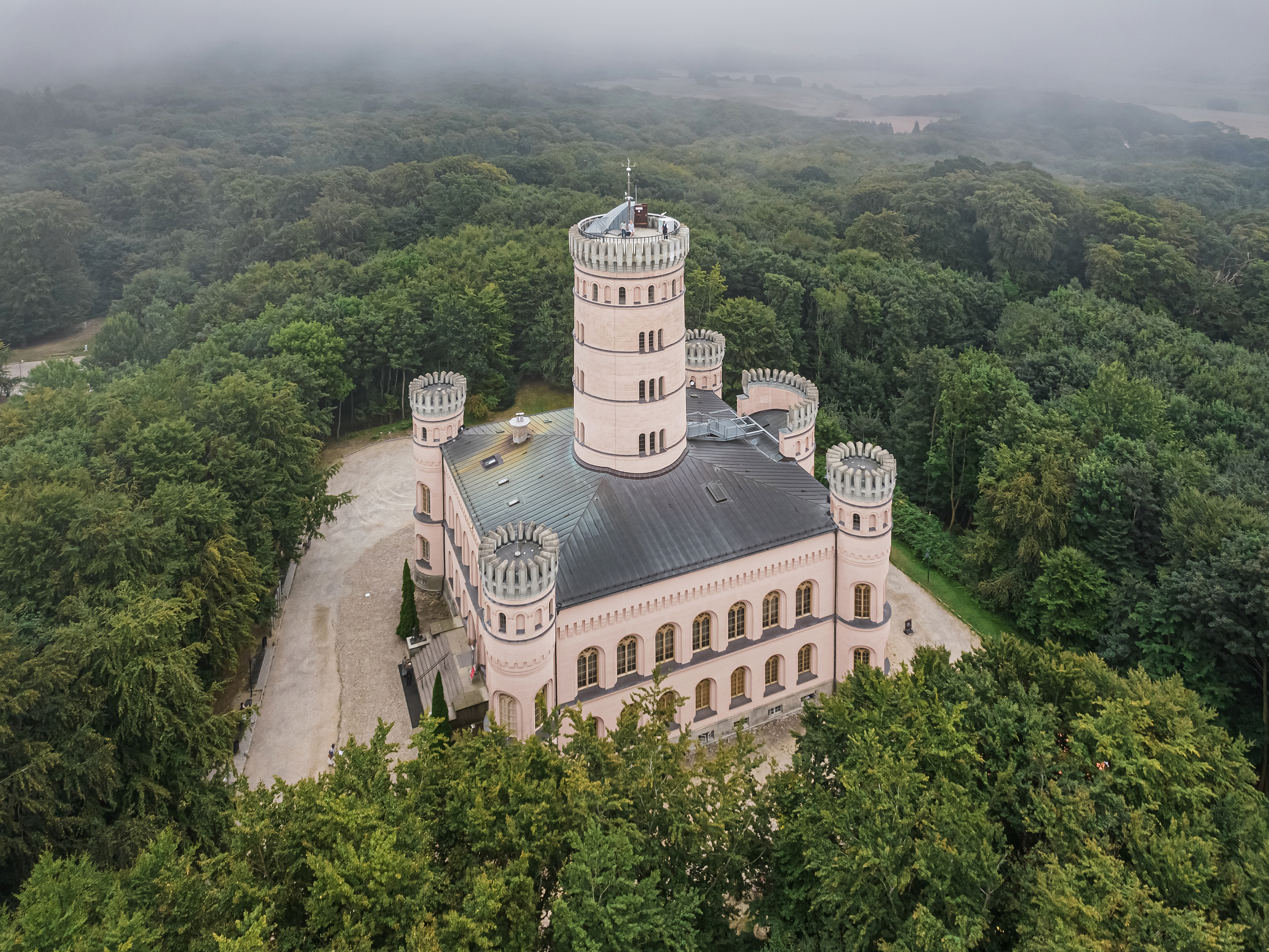
Granitz Hunting Lodge in 2022

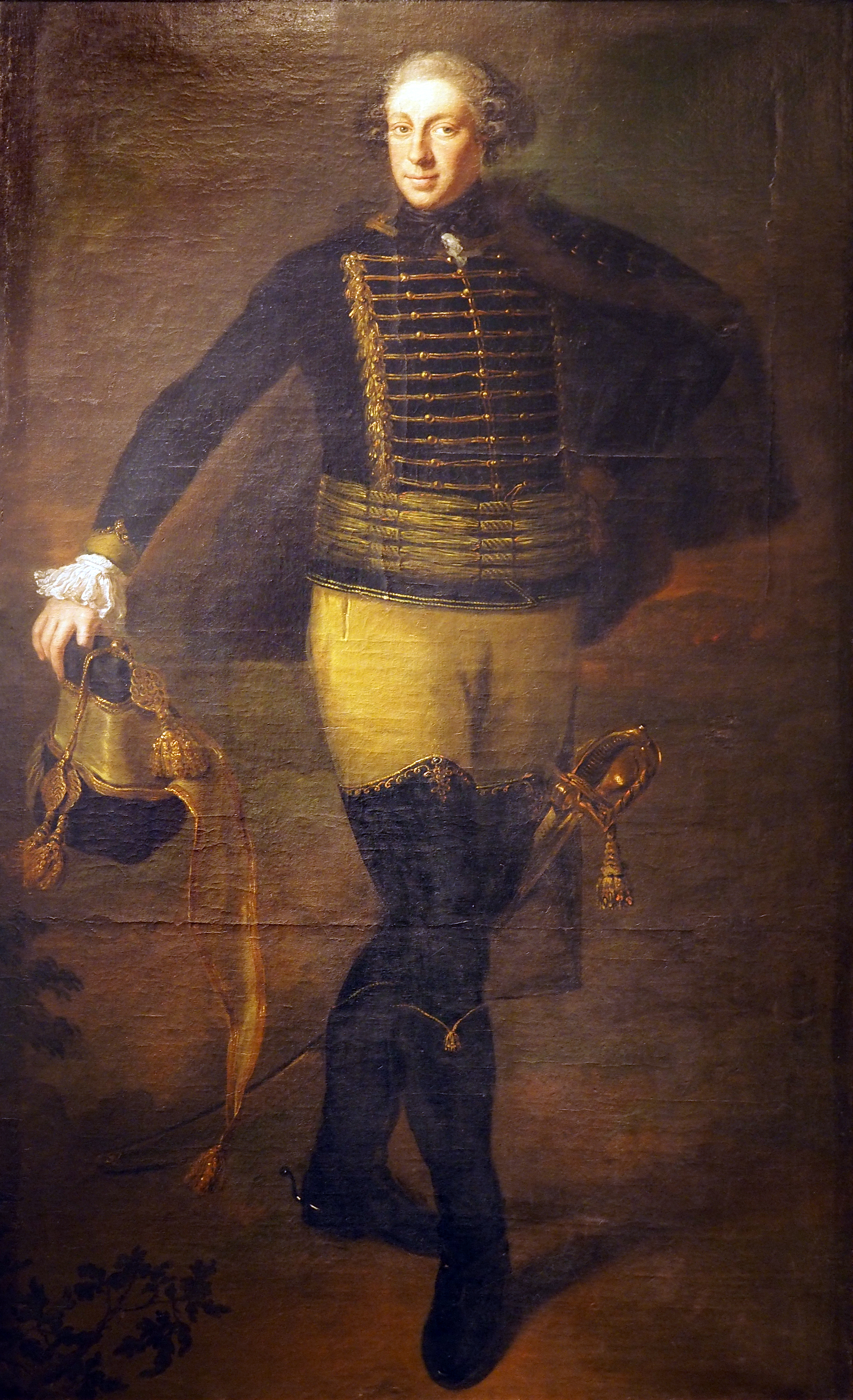
Count Malte Friedrich of Putbus (1725–1787), Government and High Court President in Swedish Pomerania, in the uniform of the Swedish Life Regiment Hussars

The aristocratic family of Putbus is of Slavic origin and a collateral line of the Rügen princely house, the Wizlawiden (House of Wizlaw) dynasty, which itself went back to the Rani kings of Rügen, beginning with Kruto (died 1093), son of Grin or Grinus, prince of Wagria.

The House of Putbus is descended from Stoislav, who was documented in 1193 and was probably a close relative of Prince Jaromar I - perhaps a brother. At the beginning, the lords of Putbus, a town on the island of Rügen, had the same territorial status as the Rügen princes, but later became their vassals. Their original possessions were near Vilmnitz (today in the borough of Putbus) on the island, and around Brandshagen, located on the Pomeranian mainland opposite the island. The latter was named after Borante, an early member of the Putbus family who built a motte-and-bailey castle in the 13th century. The name Putbus first appeared in 1286 and was adopted by all members of the family in the mid-14th century. The family continued to hold lordship in some parts of Rügen, remaining the largest land owners of the island of Rügen until the communist takeover after World War II.

In early modern epoch, lords of Pedebuz became recognized as barons. In 1727, they were created counts of Holy Roman Empire and 1731 counts in Sweden.

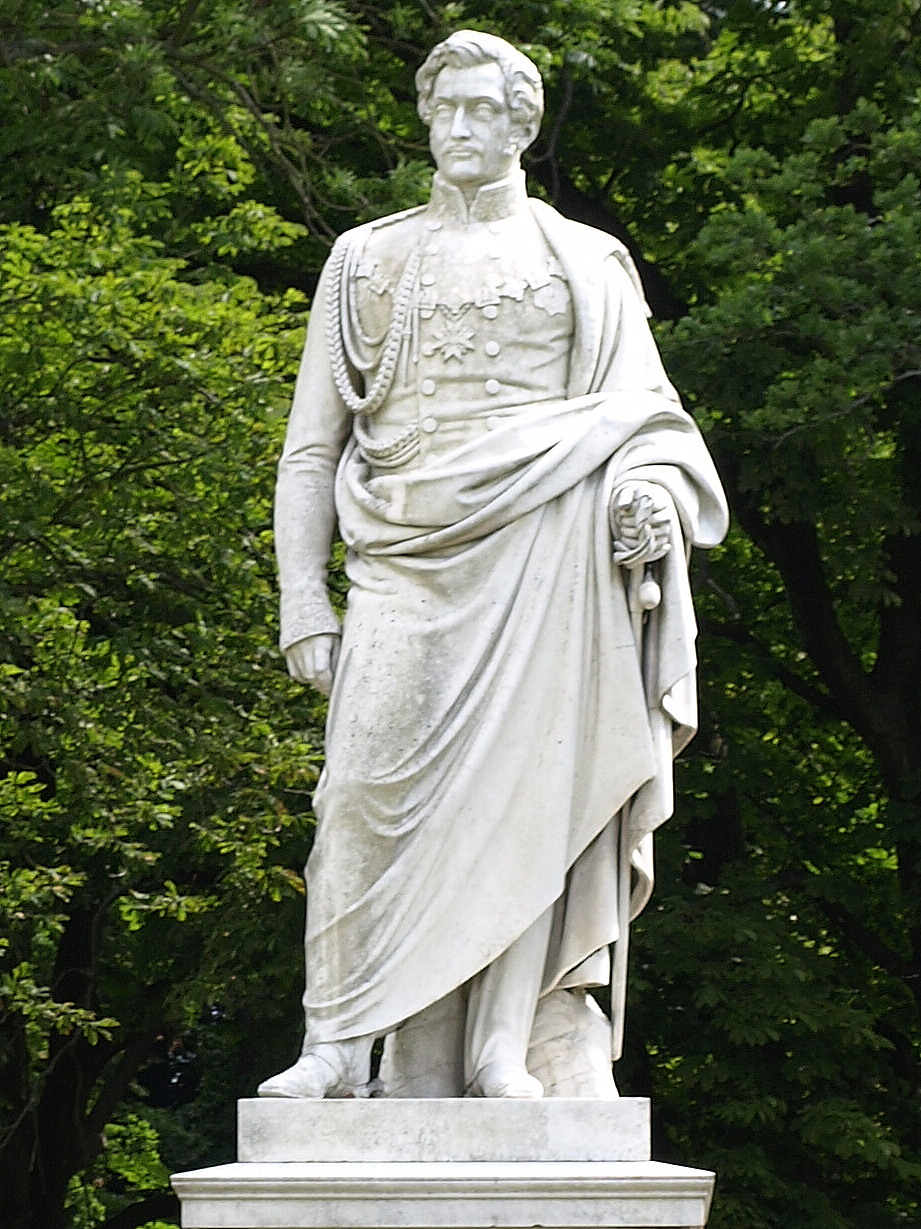
Monument to Prince Wilhelm Malte I in the castle park at Putbus

In 1807 Wilhelm Malte I was created prince (Fürst) by king Gustav IV Adolf of Sweden, Duke of Swedish Pomerania. In 1815 the King of Prussia recognized the princely title, after his assumption of power in Swedish Pomerania (now once again part of the Duchy of Pomerania as a province of Prussia). Wilhelm Malte I was the last governor general of the Province of Swedish Pomerania before it was incorporated into the Kingdom of Prussia in 1815 as New Western Pomerania and Rügen. He had actually been picked to continue running the affairs of the province under its new rulers.

When the original male line became extinct in 1854, the lordship and the titles were inherited by progeny of daughters (see Wilhelm Malte I: Progeny), with royal Prussian consent and for the later generations recognized by the judicial committee of the umbrella organization of Germany's nobility associations, and such entered into the Almanach de Gotha.

Malte von Putbus (1889–1945), 5th prince, landowner on Rügen Island, was killed by the Nazis in the Sachsenhausen concentration camp on 10 February 1945 because of his contacts with resistance fighters, after the 20 July plot.

The Communists in East Germany confiscated the estate that extended over a sixth of the island of Rügen, and destroyed Putbus Palace.

The present-day heir is Malte, prince of Putbus (b. 1964). He owns some farmland on Rügen Island as well as one of the cavalier houses on the neoclassical Putbus Circus, the roundabout that once represented the forecourt of the residential palace.

== Lineage of Podebusk ==
Stoizlav of Vilmnitz was one of earliest attested forefathers.

== Head of the House ==
- Henning Podebusk (died 1388), last Drots of Denmark

..

- Count Moritz Ulrich I (1699–1769), President of the Wismarer Tribunal (see Swedish Wismar)
- Count Malte Friedrich (1725–1787), Government and High Court President in Swedish Pomerania
- Wilhelm Malte I (1783–1854), 1st prince of Putbus, Governor of Swedish Pomerania
- Wilhelm Malte II (1833–1907), originally Count von Wylich und Lottum, 2nd prince, Steward and hereditary marshal in New Western Pomerania
- Marie Luise, Countess von Wylich und Lottum, 3rd princess (1858–1930) ⚭ 1877 Franz von Veltheim (1848–1927)
- Asta Eugenie, Countess von Wylich und Lottum, 4th princess (1860–1934) ⚭ Karl von Riepenhausen (1852–1929)
- Malte von Putbus (1889–1945), originally von Veltheim, 5th prince, nephew of Marie Luise and Asta Eugenie von Putbus, landowner, killed by the Nazis in the Sachsenhausen concentration camp
- Franz Wilhelm von Putbus, 6th prince (1927–2004)
- Malte von Putbus, 7th prince, (b. 1964), current head of the family
