= Carl Friedrich Heinrich, Graf von Wylich und Lottum =

Prussian infantry general

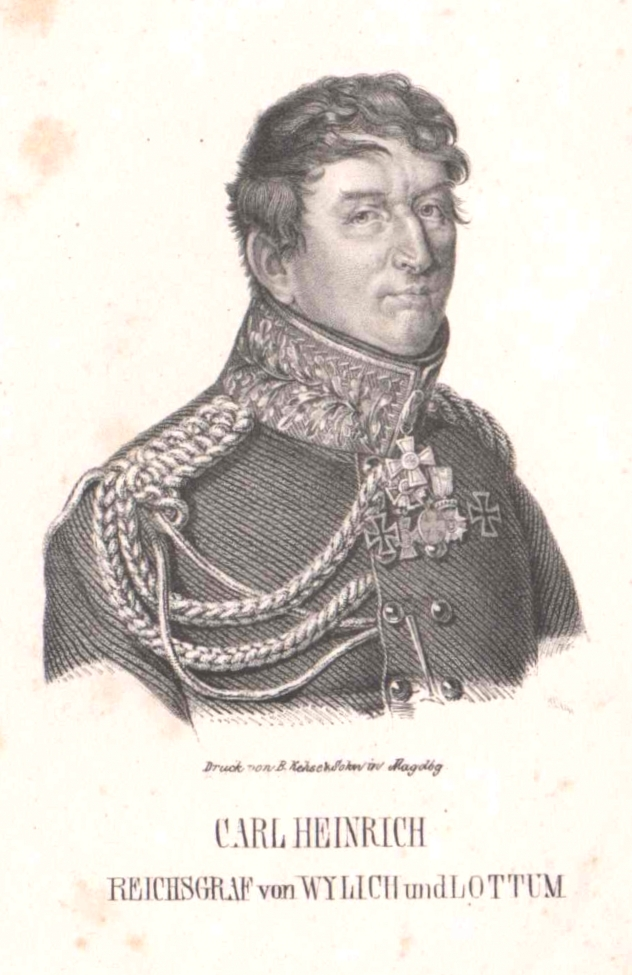
Carl Heinrich, Graf von Wylich und Lottum

Carl Friedrich Heinrich Graf von Wylich und Lottum (5 November 1767 – 14 February 1841), also called Graf Lottum (Count Lottum), was a Prussian infantry general and minister of the State. He was the son of general Friedrich Wilhelm Graf von Wylich und Lottum and his wife. (Note: Regarding personal names, Graf is a German title, translated as Count, not a first or middle name. The feminine form is Grafin.)

== Biography ==
Graf Lottum was born in Berlin and visited the Academie des Nobles, the principal educational establishment of the state, founded by Frederick the Great. On 9 April 1784 he became ensign of the Infantry Regiment of Anhalt-Bernburg, and on 26 October 1786 lieutenant. One year later, he was transferred to the newly formed fusilier battalion von Schenck, also stationed in Halle. His battalion participated in the Dutch campaign of 1787. Shortly thereafter, as an ordonnance officer, he accompanied general Graf Schulenburg-Renert in the war against France. A fall from his horse in 1793 led to a fracture of his foot and rendered him unusable for field duties.

He was assigned as an assistant to the Upper War Collegium, where he remained, raising in his rank, until the treaty of Tilsit in 1807. In the same year he was assigned to hold the Report of Military Affairs in front of the king, which should prove to be deciding for his career. During this time, and until the report was passed on to von Scharnhorst, Frederick William III came to know and esteem Graf Lottum.

In his charge as counselor for the king and being the head of the Reorganization Committee, he used his influence to strengthen the conservative tendencies in the aristocracy of Prussia. He opposed the admission of officers of civic origin, and fought against the Landsturm and the Städteordnung.

On 16 December 1808, Graf Lottum was reassigned as the head of the Military Economy Department. Then, he left the active military service with the title of Councillor of the State. This did not last long however, as he became general major on 3 February 1810.

In the war of 1812 against Russia, he was sent by the king to Warsaw, to negotiate with Emperor Napoleon the right of passage through Prussian territories. In spring 1813 he was assigned to the Upper Governmental Commission, which had to lead most state affairs in the absence of the king.

In 1814 and 1815, Graf Lottum remained mostly in Paris, to manage outstanding payments owed by France. After his return in 1817, he quit the army for a second time. In the following he led the financial affairs for the State Council, for a shorter time the external affairs and the financial affairs for the Ministry of the Interior.

On 3 August 1828, he was appointed General of the Infantry by the king.

Graf Lottum died in Berlin on 14 February 1841, shortly after his wife. He has been characterized as a hard-working, but gentle person without strong political ambitions.

Graf Lottum is an honorary citizen of the city of Berlin. The street Lottumstraße in the district Prenzlauer Berg is named after him.
