= Johann Christoph, Graf von Wylich und Lottum =

Prussian officer 1681–1727

Major General Johann Christoph, Count of Wylich and Lottum (9 May 1681 in Cleves – 16 October 1727 at Schloss Hueth, in Rees) was a Prussian officer.

== Sources ==
- König, Anton Balthasar (1789), Biographisches Lexikon aller Helden und Militairpersonen, vol. 2, A. Wever, p. 439–440
