= Friedrich Wilhelm, Graf von Wylich und Lottum =

Major General Friedrich Wilhelm, Count of Wylich and Lottum (18 March 1716 in Berlin – 17 December 1774) was a Prussian officer, and Commandant of Berlin.

== Sources ==
- Bernhard von Poten (1898). "Wylich und Lottum, Friedrich Wilhelm Graf von" . Allgemeine Deutsche Biographie (in German). Vol. 44. Leipzig: Duncker & Humblot. pp. 393–394.
