= Schmachter See and Fangerien Nature Reserve =

Nature reserve in Mecklenburg-Vorpommern, Germany

Coordinates: 54.39445°N 13.59112°E

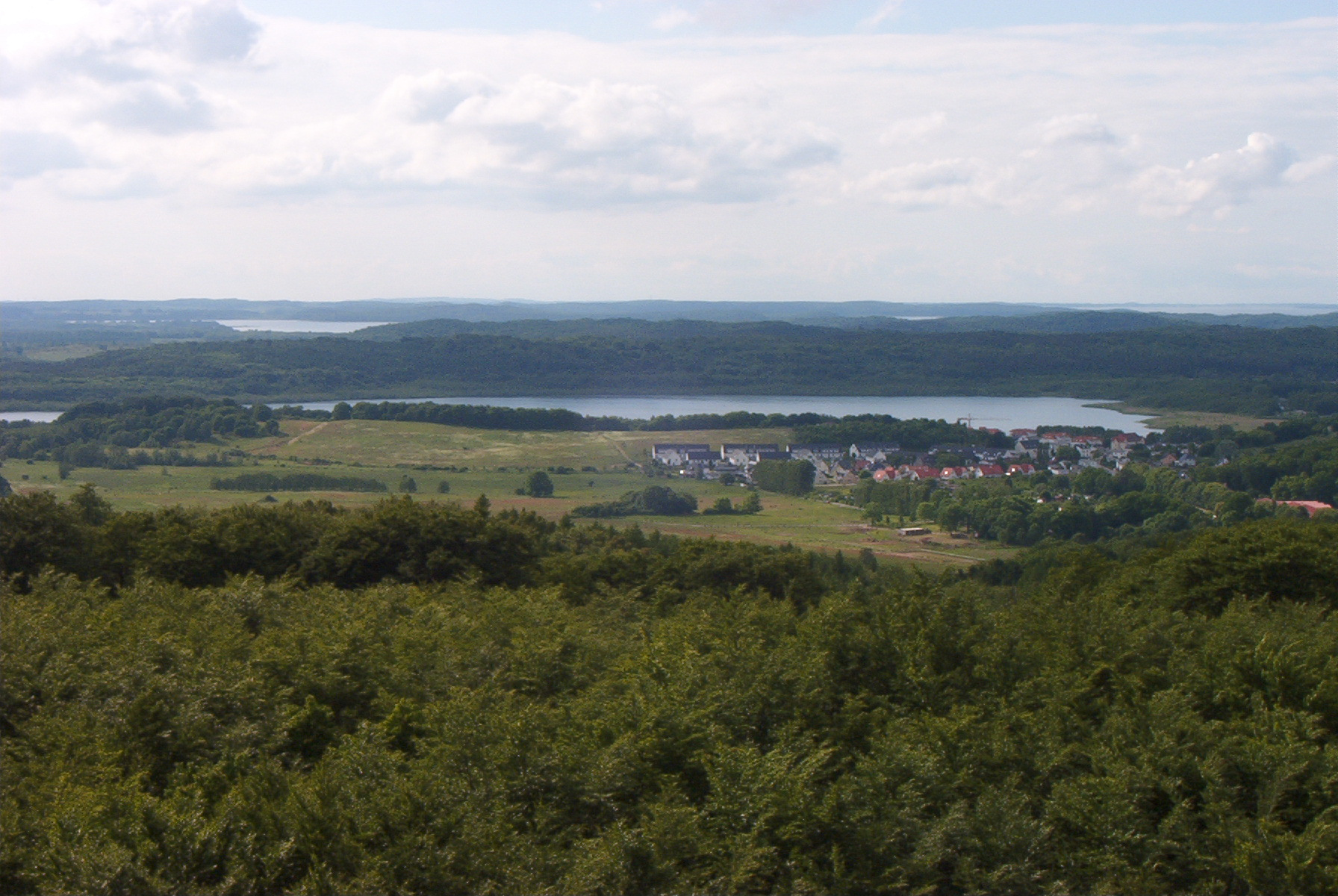
View from Granitz hunting lodge of the Schmachter See and the Fangerien behind.

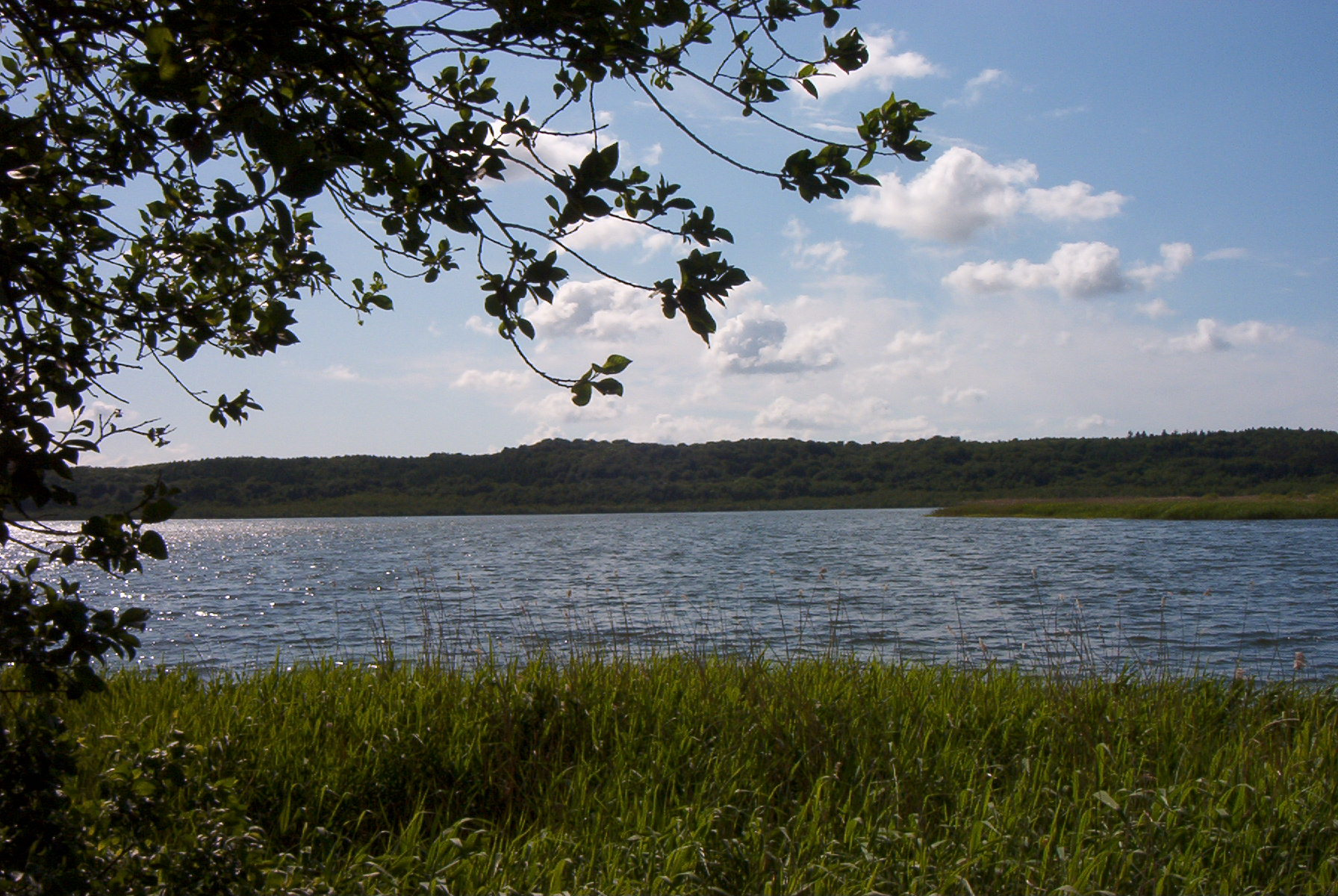
Southern shore of the Schmachter See.

The Schmachter See and Fangerien Nature Reserve (German: Naturschutzgebiet Schmachter See und Fangerien) is a nature reserve in the German state of Mecklenburg-Western Pomerania and covers an area of 262 hectares. It was placed under conservation protection on 7 December 1994 with the goal of preserving and cultivating a section of the East Rügen hill country together with a silted lake and adjacent wet meadows, bogs and woods.

The lake of Schmachter See lies immediately southwest of Binz. The village of Schmacht that lent the lake its name lies near the western shore of the lake. The nature reserve borders to the south on the parish of Serams and the B 196 federal road. The Fangerien is a beech wood on the northwestern shore of the lake. The condition of the woods is graded as "good". The poor state of the Schmachter See was improved as part of a major conservation project, the East Rügen Bodden Country (Ostrügensche Boddenlandschaft), which implemented re-naturalisation measures.

== Literature ==
- Umweltministerium Mecklenburg-Vorpommern, ed. (2003), "Schmachter See und Fangerien 292", Die Naturschutzgebiete in Mecklenburg-Vorpommern (in German), Schwerin: Demmler-Verlag, pp. 136f, ISBN 3-91-015052-7
