= Zirkow =

- Municipality
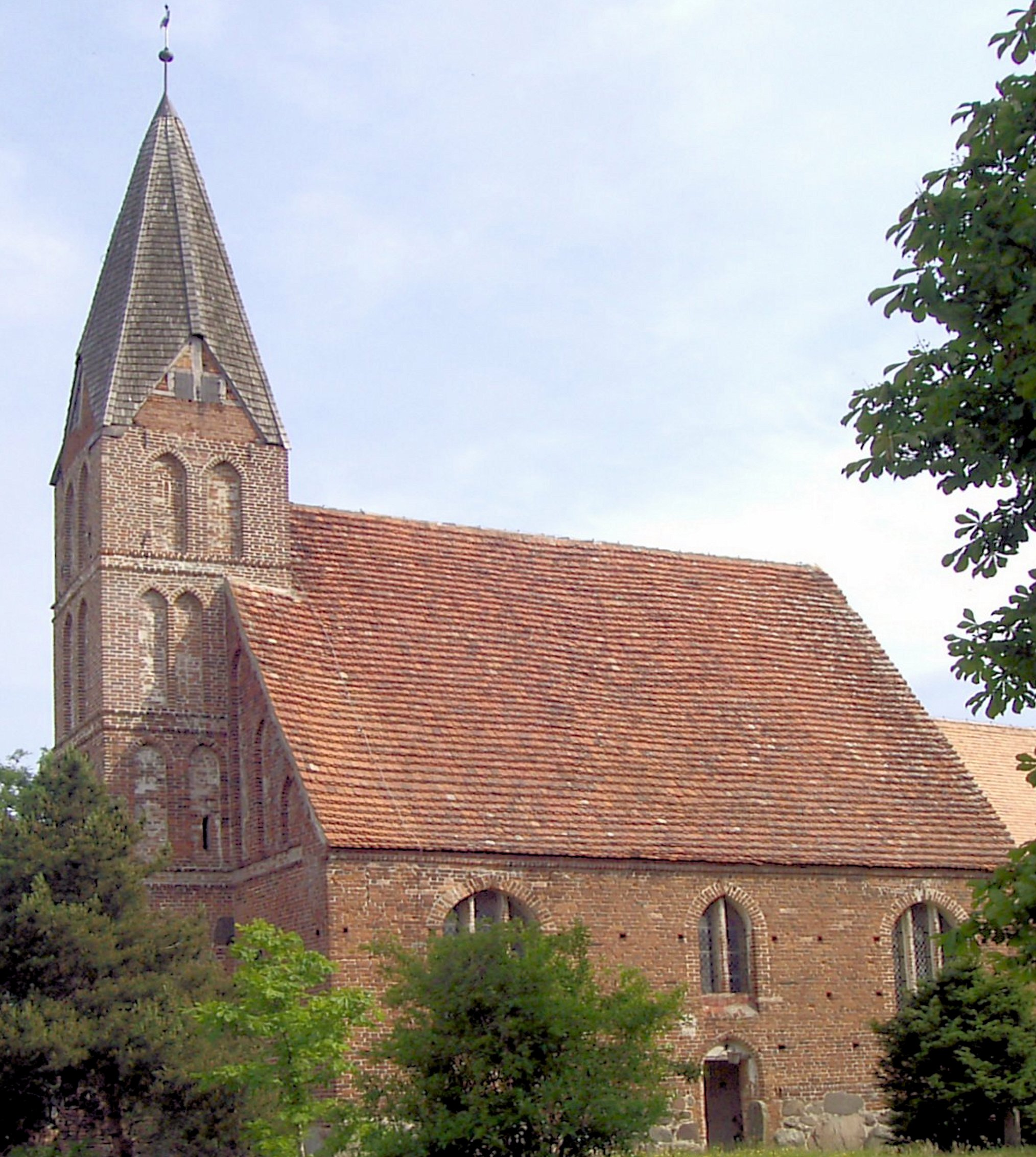
- Church of Zirkow

- Location of Zirkow within Vorpommern-Rügen district
- Interactive map of Zirkow
- Location within Germany Location within Mecklenburg-Vorpommern
- Coordinates: 54°23′N 13°32′E
- Country: Germany
- State: Mecklenburg-Vorpommern
- District: Vorpommern-Rügen
- Municipal assoc.: Mönchgut-Granitz

Government
  - Mayor: Jens Hoyer

Area
  - Total: 25.62 km^{2} (9.89 sq mi)
- Elevation: 25 m (82 ft)

Population (2025-12-31)
  - Total: 664
  - Density: 25.9/km^{2} (67.1/sq mi)
- Time zone: UTC+01:00 (CET)
  - Summer (DST): UTC+02:00 (CEST)
- Postal codes: 18528
- Dialling codes: 038301, 038393
- Vehicle registration: RÜG
- Website: www.amt-moenchgut.de

Zirkow is a municipality on the German Baltic Sea island of Rügen in the county of Vorpommern-Rügen in the state of Mecklenburg-Western Pomerania.

== Geography ==
Zirkow lies in the Southeast Rügen Biosphere Reserve between the small town of Putbus and the Baltic Sea resort of Binz. In the northeast it borders on the lake of Schmachter See near Binz.

=== Municipal divisions ===
Within the municipality of Zirkow are the following villages: Alt Süllitz, Dalkvitz, Nistelitz, Pantow, Schmacht, Serams and Viervitz.

== History ==
The village of Zirkow was first documented in 1495. The place name comes from the Slavic Sirakov and means "place of Sirak".

To 1326 the area was part of the Principality of Rügen and, thereafter, the Duchy of Pomerania.

Under the Treaty of Westphalia in 1648 Rügen, and thus Zirkow, came under Swedish rule, having previously belonged to the Duchy of Pomerania. In 1815 the parish, along with West Pomerania, went into the Prussian Province of Pomerania.

In 1818, Zirkow became part of the county of Landkreis Rügen, apart from a short spell from 1952 to 1955 when it was in the County of Putbus. It remained until 1990 in Kreis Rügen in the district of Rostock and became, in the same year, part of the state of Mecklenburg-Western Pomerania. From 1990, the county was renamed Landkreis Rügen until 2011 when it became part of the new county of Vorpommern-Rügen.

== Sights ==
- Brick church with a fieldstone base from the 1st half of the 15th century, see St. John's Church, Zirkow
- Historic village centre with protected thatched timber-framed houses
- Museum farm with the Rügenhaus
- Schmachter See and Fangerien Nature Reserve
- Hill of Rügener Jungfrau ("Rügen Virgin"), the so-called Busenberge ("bosom hills")
