= Rügen narrow-gauge railway =

German narrow-gauge railway line

Coordinates: 54.376475°N 13.618339°E

Rügensche Bäderbahn
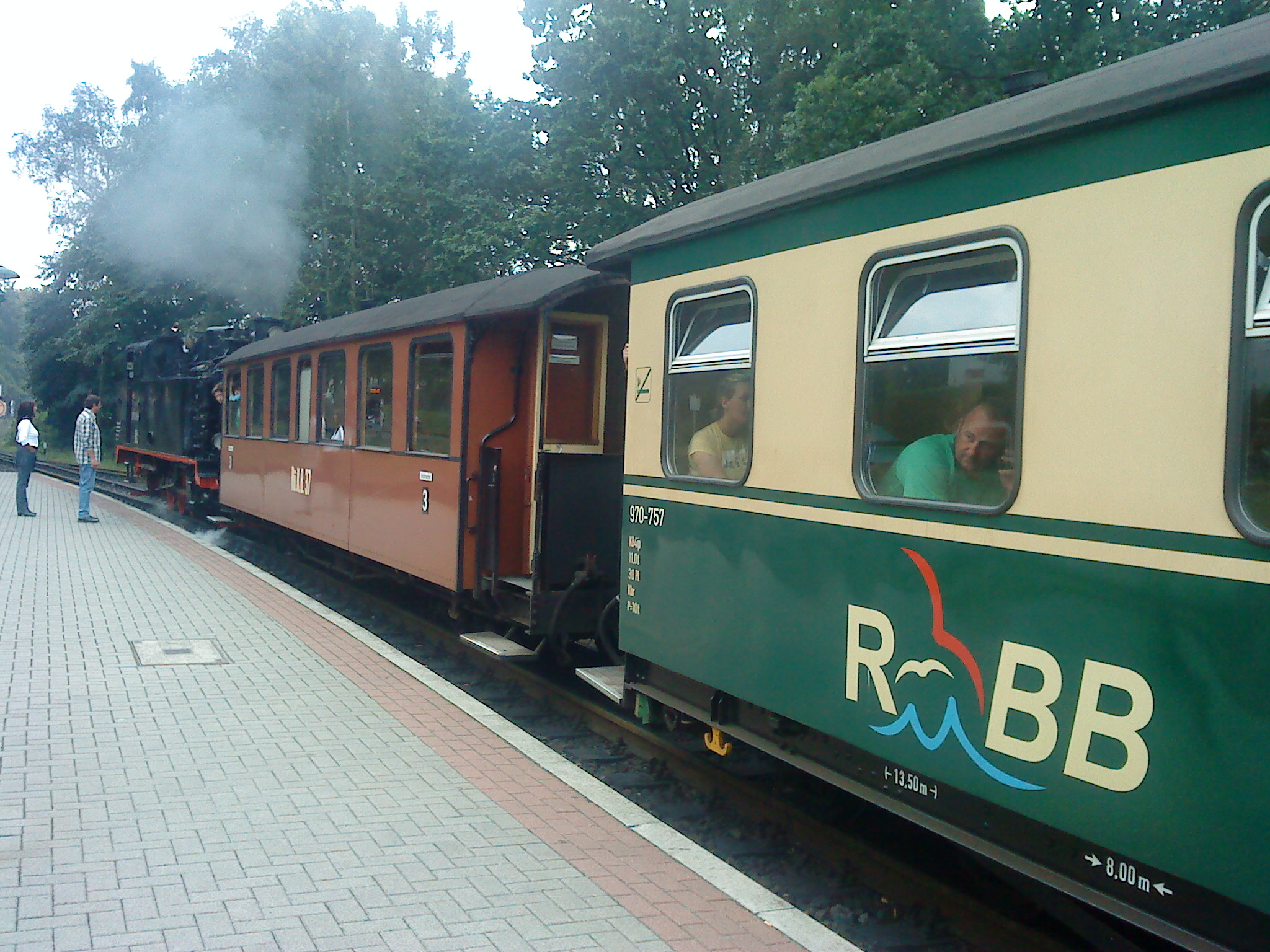
- Rasender Roland

Altefähr–Putbus–Göhren
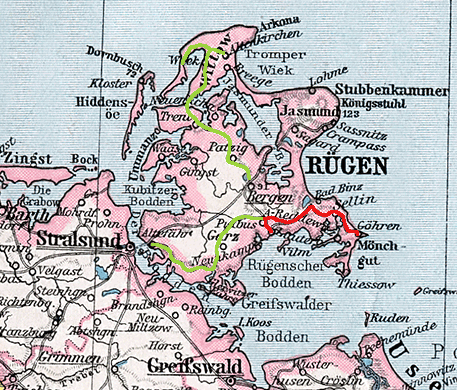

Overview
- Line number: 6982, 6775 (partly)

Service
- Route number: 199

Technical
- Line length: 24.1 km (15 mi)
- Track gauge: 750 mm (2 ft 5 1/2 in)

Bergen–Altenkirchen (1895–1967/68/70)
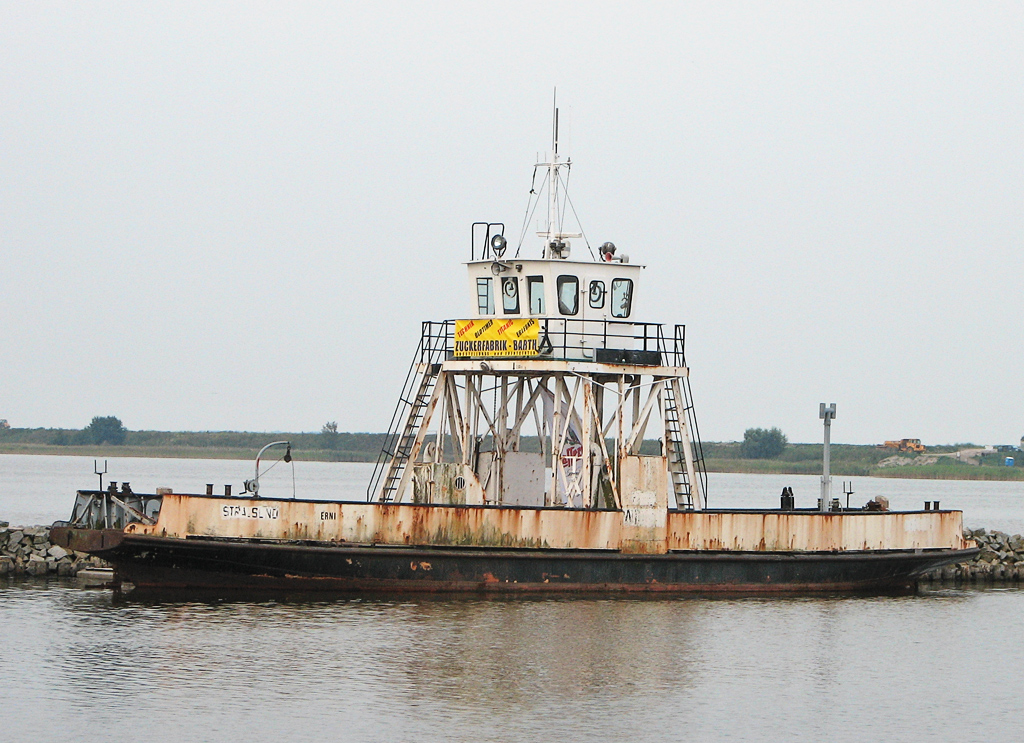
- Wittow Ferry of 1896 in the port at Barth (2005)

Buhrkow–Bug (1918–1926)

The Rügen narrow-gauge railway (German: Rügensche Bäderbahn, formerly Rügensche Kleinbahn or RüKB) – nicknamed Rasender Roland ("Raging Roland") – is a steam-powered narrow-gauge railway that runs from Putbus by way of Binz, Sellin, and Baabe to Göhren on the island of Rügen off the Baltic coast in Mecklenburg-Vorpommern, Germany. Since 2008, it has been run by the Eisenbahn-Bau- und Betriebsgesellschaft Pressnitztalbahn mbH. There is an interchange with the island's Deutsche Bahn mainline network via the Veolia-run OLA railways. The Rasender Roland is one of the island's tourist attractions. It serves several holiday destinations, mainly the bathing resorts in Rügen's southeast.

The railway runs regularly along a stretch of 24 km (14.5 mi.) of track with historic steam locomotives and coaches, some of which are almost a hundred years old. Unlike the Deutsche Bahn national system which uses 1,435 mm (4 ft 8 1/2 in) standard gauge, Rasender Roland uses the narrow gauge of 750 mm (2 ft 5 1/2 in). The maximum speed is 30 kilometres per hour (19 mph).

== History ==
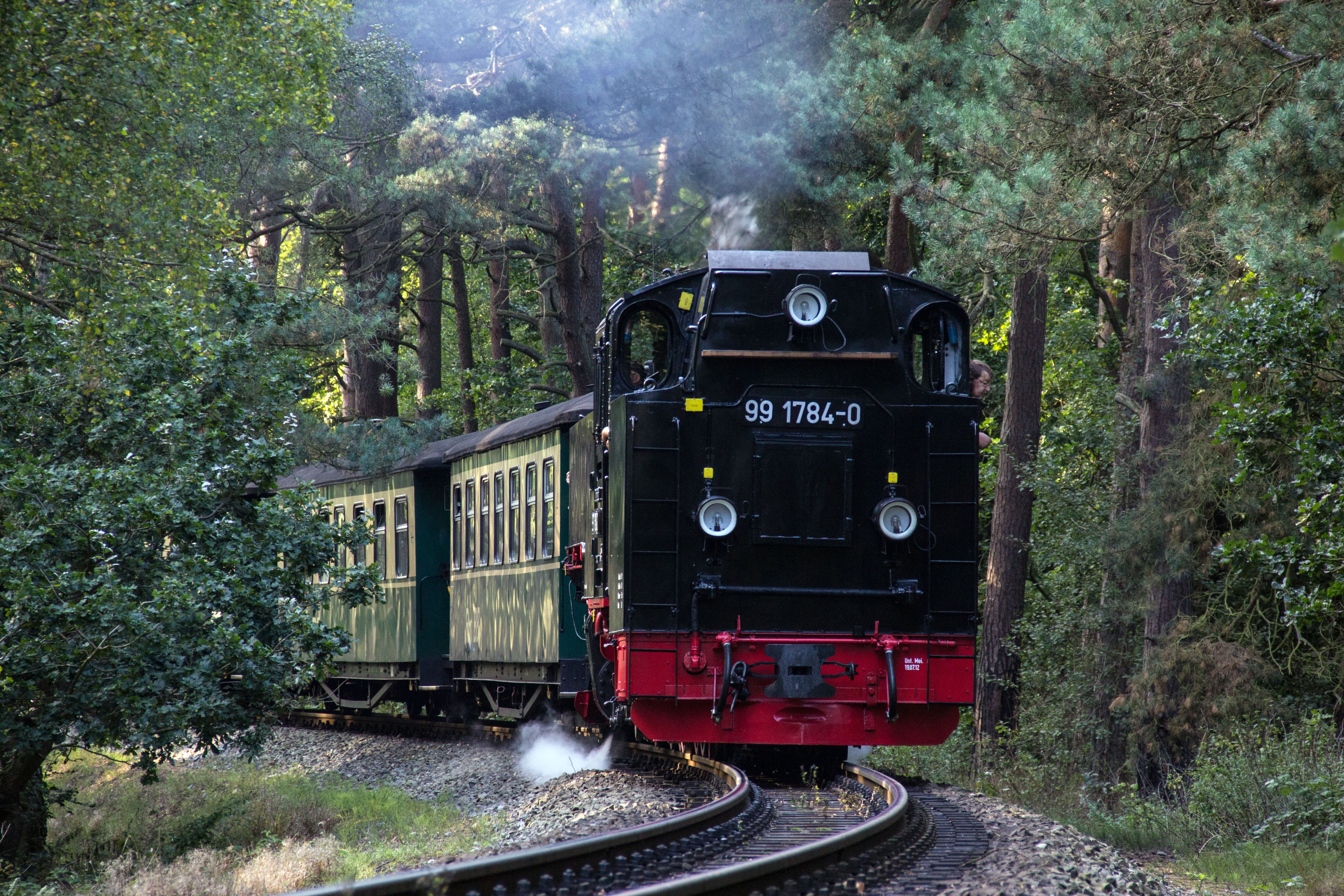
Rasender Roland narrow-gauge train.

The first stretch of the line that was opened, running from Putbus to Binz and still in service today, began operations on 22 July 1895. The operator, Rügensche Kleinbahn-Aktiengesellschaft (RüKB), had extended its network to 104.82 km by 21 December 1896. One part went from Altefähr railway station, opposite Stralsund, by way of Putbus to Göhren. The other part led from Altenkirchen near Cape Arkona to Bergen by way of the Wittow Ferry; however, the ferry there that joined two stretches of line on separate lobes of Rügen normally only carried goods wagons, and passengers had to transfer on foot. The bulk of the lines were abandoned on 3 December 1967, on 10 September 1968 and on 20 January 1970.

Shortly after the outbreak of the Second World War, in 1940, the Pommersche Landesbahnen (Pomeranian State Railways) also took over the Rügensche Kleinbahn-Aktiengesellschaft. From 1949, Rasender Roland belonged to the East German state railway, and on 1 January 1996 it came under the care of the newly founded Rügensche Kleinbahn GmbH & Co. In early 2008 the railway became a subsidiary of Pressnitztalbahn Gmbh, and its trading name was changed to Rügensche BäderBahn.

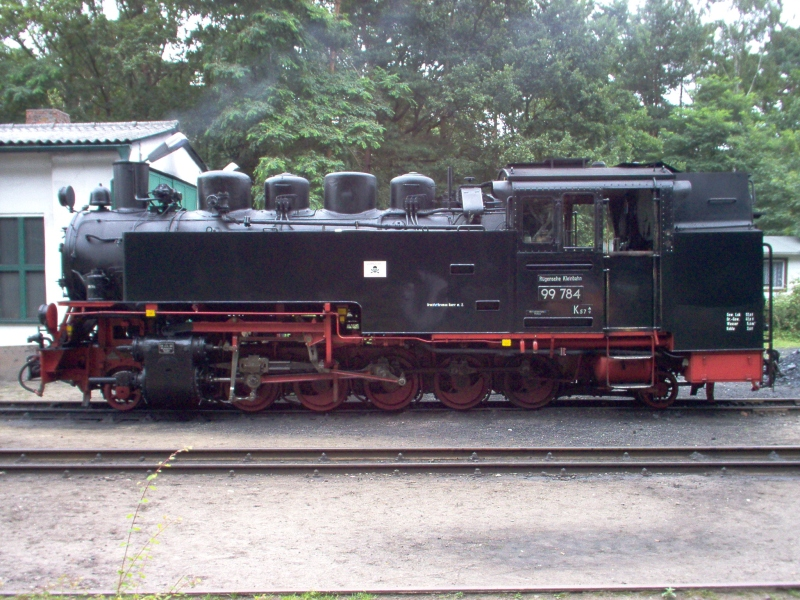
Side view of RüKB 99 784, built in the '50s in East Germany. (2007)

== Motive power ==
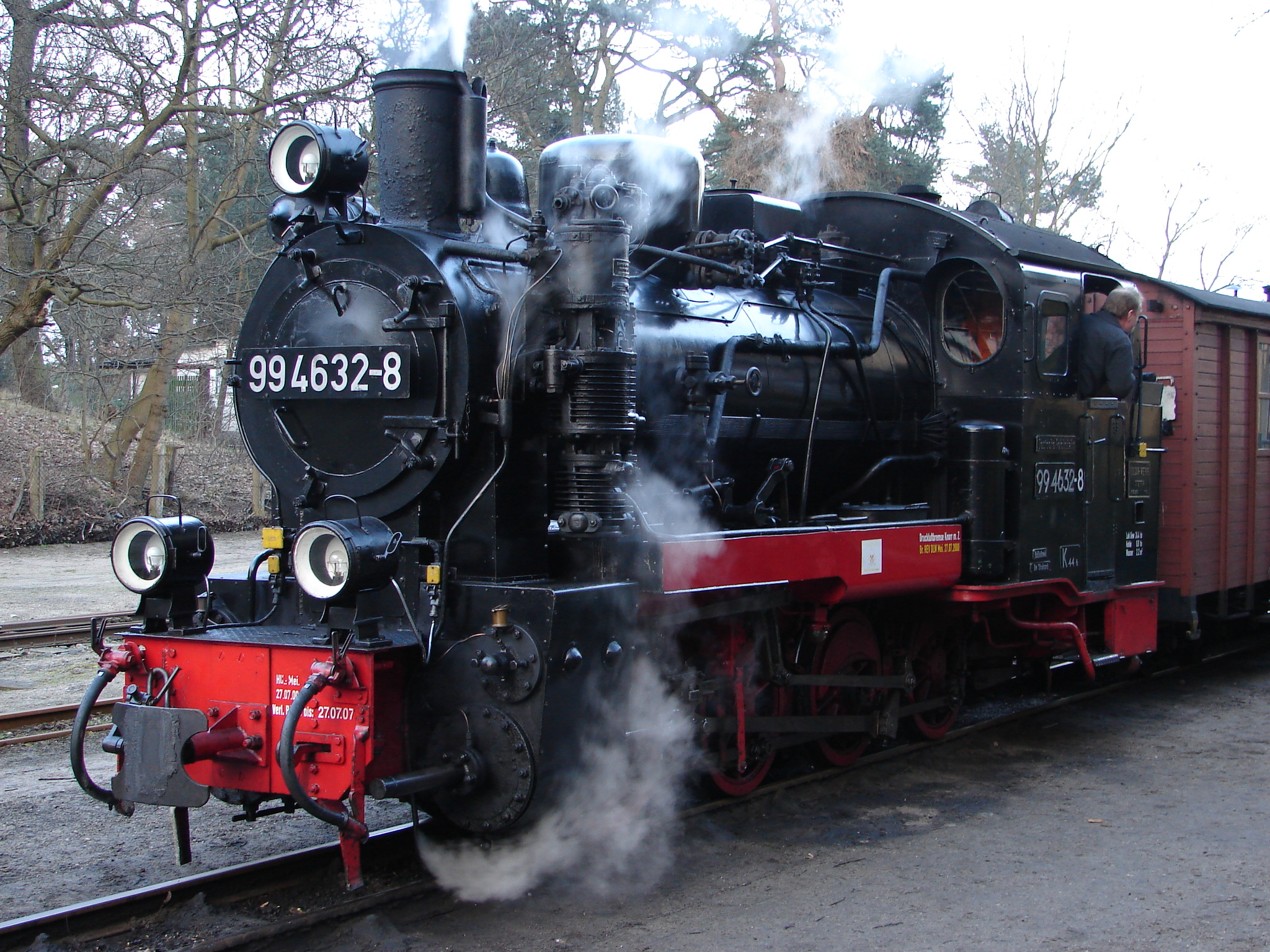
Another Rasender Roland loc' at Sellin.

To begin with, four-coupled steam locomotives of Lenz Class n and Lenz Class m were deployed; later they were joined by six-coupled locos of Lenz Class o and eight-coupled engines of Lenz Class nn and Class Mh. A Prussian T 36 also came to Rügen.

After the Deutsche Reichsbahn took over the line, locomotives from other railways appeared, most for just a short period. These included DR classes 99.451, 99.453, 99.464, 99.465 and 99.480, but especially the Class 99.51–60, the Saxon IV K. From the 1980s there were also newly designed locomotives (Neubauloks) of Class 99.77–79. The latter is still used today, alongside Class M and 99.480 locomotives. Today there are also various privately owned steam engines underway on the line. Since 1965 there have also been diesel locomotives, primarily for shunting duties. Initially two former military (Heeresfeldbahn) Köfs, of which one is still around. Since 1998 the former DB locomotive no. V 51 901 has also operated on Rügen.

On the Rügen narrow-gauge network, Görlitz counterweight brakes were used to start with. In 1965 they began to be replaced by compressed air brakes. In contrast to many other narrow-gauge routes, the pipe couplings were arranged symmetrically on the vehicles. Because the original engines did not have any heating pipe couplings, the passenger coaches had to be equipped with stoves. Even the coaches that replaced them in the 1960s from Saxon railways were retrofitted with stoves. From the outset until today, Equalising lever coupler have been used. Transporter wagons (Rollwagen) have never been employed.

From 21 March 2008 train services on 21 March 2008 were carried out with diesel locomotive 199 008-4 from the Pressnitztalbahn, no. 99 773 from the SDG and steam loco 99 787 from the Saxon Oberlausitz Railway Company. Luggage vans and coaches were hired from the SDG and SOEG. After operations with the hired vehicles at the start of the winter timetable 2008/09 had finished, the vehicles were returned to Saxony shortly thereafter.

A "new" locomotive, formerly No. 7 with the Mansfeld Mining Railway has been in service since October 2008 under the number 99 4011.

== Accidents ==
On 20 October 1936, a train was derailed due to high winds, causing five persons to be injured.

On 14 August 2005, there was an accident at Binz station due to a wrongly set turnout which resulted in one train striking another waiting train. According to the police, 30 people were injured in the mishap.

== Cultural references ==
The musical duo De Plattfööt, founded in 1979, sang Up'n rasenden Roland, which appeared in 1985 on the AMIGA LP Songs ut Meckelbörg. The song, which is sang in Low German, is about the Rügen railway.
