= RüKB Nos. 51Mh to 53Mh =

Lenz Class M, Mh RüKB 51Mh–53Mh Class 99.463
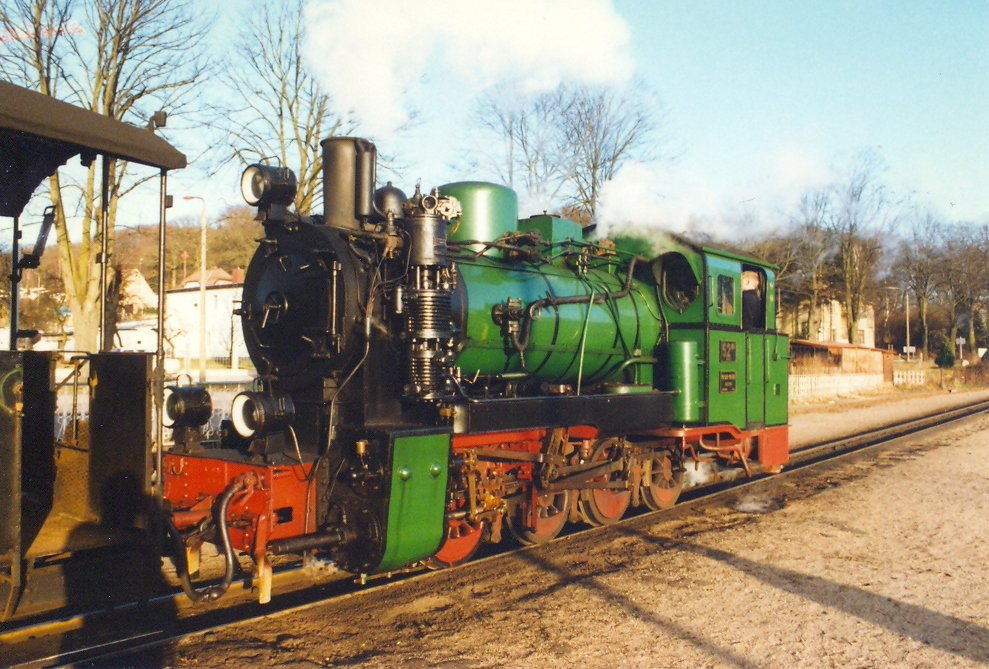
Type and origin
- Builder: Stettiner Maschinenbau AG Vulcan
- Build date: 1913, 1914, 1925
- Total produced: 3
Specifications
- Configuration
  - Whyte: 0-8-0
  - German: K 44.6
- Gauge: 750 mm (2 ft 5 1/2 in)
- Driver dia.: 850 mm (33.46 in)
- Coupled dia.: 850 mm (33.46 in)
- Wheelbase
  - Overall: 3,400 mm (11 ft 1 7/8 in), 3,450 mm (11 ft 3 7/8 in) *
- Length
  - Over beams: 7,724 mm (25 ft 4 1/8 in); 8,000 mm (26 ft 3 in) *
- Width: 2,200 mm (7 ft 2 5/8 in)
- Height: 3,150 mm (10 ft 4 in); 3,200 mm (10 ft 6 in) *
- Empty weight: 18.5 t (18.2 long tons; 20.4 short tons); 20.5 t (20.2 long tons; 22.6 short tons) *
- Service weight: 23.5 t (23.1 long tons; 25.9 short tons); 25.5 t (25.1 long tons; 28.1 short tons) *
- Fuel capacity: 0.8 t (0.79 long tons; 0.88 short tons) coal
- Water cap.: 2.2 m^{3} (78 cu ft)
- Boiler pressure: 12 bar (1,200 kPa; 174 psi)
- Heating surface
  - Firebox: 0.90 m^{2} (9.7 sq ft)
  - Radiative: 3.52 m^{2} (37.9 sq ft)
  - Evaporative: 46.7 m^{2} (503 sq ft); 33.77 m^{2} (363.5 sq ft)
- Superheater
  - Heating area: 13.03 m^{2} (140.3 sq ft) *
- Cylinders: 2
- Cylinder size: 350 mm (13.78 in)
- Piston stroke: 400 mm (15.75 in)
- Valve gear: Heusinger with lifting link, Gegenkurbel voreilend
Performance figures
- Maximum speed: 30 km/h (19 mph)
- Indicated power: 200 PS (147 kW; 197 hp); 235 PS (173 kW; 232 hp) *
- Tractive effort
  - Starting: 40.69 kN (9,150 lb_{f})
Career
- Numbers: RüKB 51Mh–53Mh; DR 99.4631–4633

The RüKB Nos. 51Mh–53Mh were German narrow gauge steam locomotives operated by the Rügen narrow gauge railway on the island of Rügen in the Baltic Sea. They were absorbed in 1949 into the Deutsche Reichsbahn in East Germany as their Class 99.463.

== History ==
In 1913 and 1914 the Pomeranian provincial authorities, who had running powers for the following narrow gauge lines, bought a total of eight eight-coupled locomotives from Vulcan in Stettin grouping them as Class M:

- Kleinbahn Casekow–Penkun–Oder (1)
- Greifswald–Jarmener Kleinbahn (GJK) (1)
- Rügensche Kleinbahn (RüKB) (2)
- Demminer Kleinbahn West (2)
- Demminer Kleinbahn Ost (1)
- Kleinbahn Greifswald–Wolgast (1).

Because they proved themselves well, in 1925 a second locomotive was procured for both the GJK and the RüKB. These two engines were amongst the first superheated steam locomotives, unlike the first batch. They were therefore classified as the Mh.

Because the superheated locomotives performed even better, in 1928 the RüKB decided to convert their older machines to superheating.

After the RüKB was taken over by the Deutsche Reichsbahn in 1949, the three engines were given the new running numbers 99 4631 to 99 4633. In 1992 nos. 99 4632 and 4633 were given new boilers and cylinders at Raw Görlitz. Both locos were finally in service in the original green RüKB livery as locomotives 52 and 53 Mh. No. 99 4631 became a monument from 1984 to 2002 at Lehrte but is now back with the RüKB, the others are still in operation as before on the island of Rügen. No. 99 4632 phase been working in black Reichsbahn colours since 2003.

== See also ==
- List of East German Deutsche Reichsbahn locomotives and railbuses
- List of preserved steam locomotives in Germany
- Rügensche Kleinbahn

== Sources ==
- Kieper, Klaus; Preuß, Reiner (1980). Schmalspurbahnarchiv (in German). Berlin: transpress VEB Verlag für Verkehrswesen.
- Kieper, Klaus; Preuß, Reiner (1980). Schmalspur zwischen Ostsee und Erzgebirge (in German). Düsseldorf: Alba Buchverlag. ISBN 3-87094-069-7.
- Obermayer, Horst J. (1971). Taschenbuch Deutsche Schmalspur-Dampflokomotiven (in German). Stuttgart: Franckh. ISBN 3-440-03818-1.
