= Binz =

- Municipality
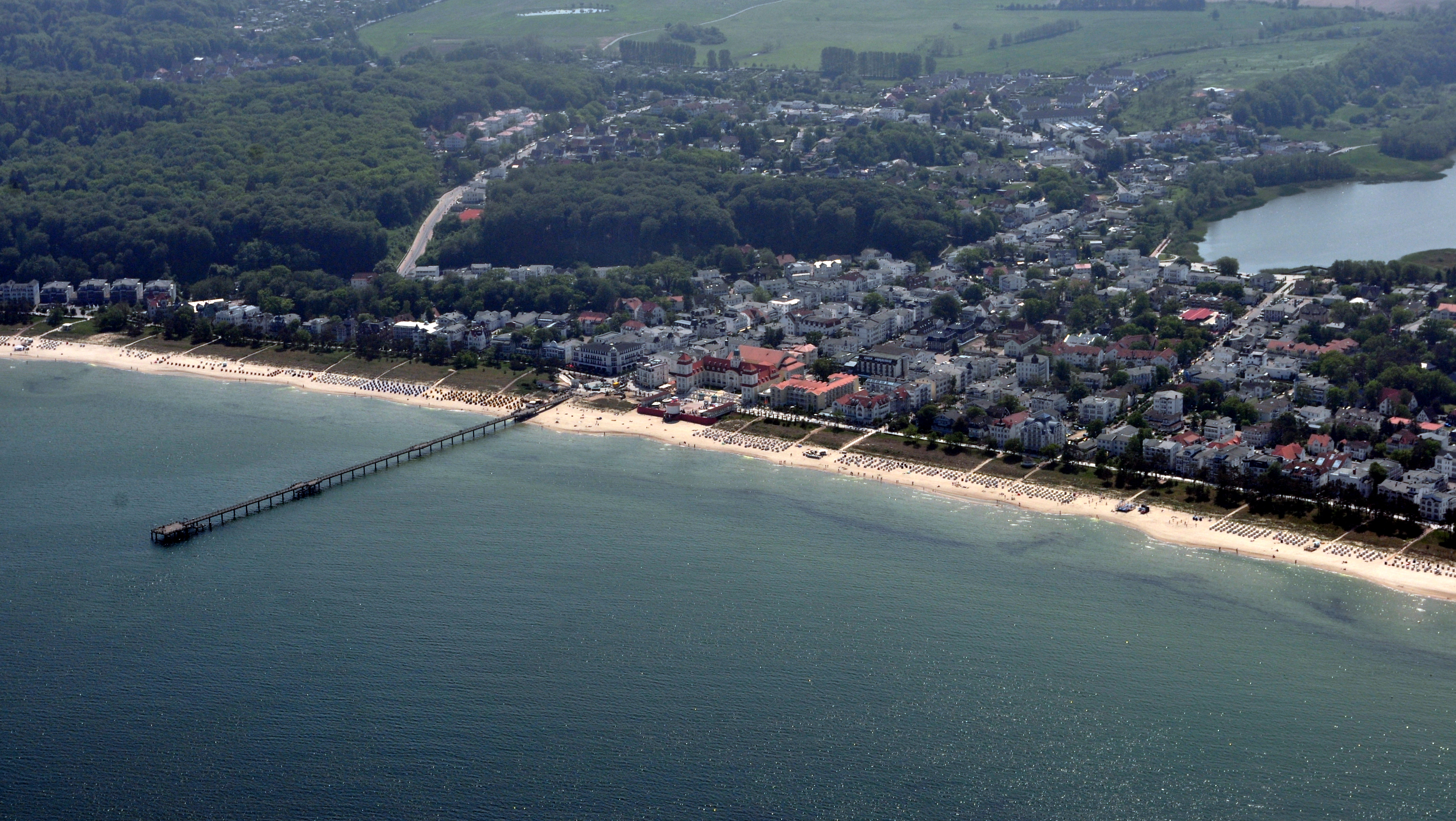
- Aerial view of Binz

- Coat of arms

- Location of Binz within Vorpommern-Rügen district
- Interactive map of Binz
- Location within Germany Location within Mecklenburg-Vorpommern
- Coordinates: 54°24′N 13°36′E
- Country: Germany
- State: Mecklenburg-Vorpommern
- District: Vorpommern-Rügen

Government
  - Mayor: Karsten Schneider

Area
  - Total: 25.18 km^{2} (9.72 sq mi)
- Elevation: 7 m (23 ft)

Population (2025-12-31)
  - Total: 5,293
  - Density: 210.2/km^{2} (544.4/sq mi)
- Time zone: UTC+01:00 (CET)
  - Summer (DST): UTC+02:00 (CEST)
- Postal codes: 18609
- Dialling codes: 038393
- Vehicle registration: RÜG
- Website: gemeinde-binz.de

Binz (German pronunciation: [bɪnts]) is the largest seaside resort city on the German island of Rügen.

It is situated between the bay of Prorer Wiek and the Schmachter See (a lake) in the southeast of the island. To the north of Binz stretches the Schmale Heide (the "narrow heath"), a tongue of land which joins the Muttland region of Rügen to the Jasmund peninsula. The land to the south and east of Binz is hilly, reaching a height of over 100 metres above sea level.

Binz is known for its well-kept historical resort architecture and natural scenery, close to the Jasmund National Park and its chalk cliffs.

== Geography ==
=== Location ===
Binz lies on the eastern coast of the island of Rügen between the bay of Prorer Wiek and the lake of Schmachter See. North of Binz is the Schmale Heide, a neck of land that links the Muttland – Rügen's central region – with the peninsula of Jasmund. East and south of the municipality, the land is rolling, in the southeast, in the Granitz, the land climbs to just over 100 m above sea level (NN). The resort of Prora belongs to Binz.

Precipitation diagram of Binz

=== Climate ===
The annual precipitation is 611 mm and is relatively low, falling within the lowest quarter of values within Germany. At 23% of the weather stations of the German Met Office lower values are recorded. The driest month is February, the most rain falls in July. In July 1.9 times as much precipitation falls as in February. Precipitation varies very little and is very evenly spread throughout the year. At only 10% of weather stations are lower seasonal variations recorded.

== History ==
=== Fishing and farming village ===
In 1318 the place was mentioned for the first time, as Byntze , in a tax collection document for the County of Streu (Grafschaft Streu). The heart of the settlement was the middle of the present Bahnhofstraße and Rabenstraße. In addition there were the farmsteads of Granitz-Hof and Aalbeck. The church village and centre of the parish was Zirkow.

A first sign of its subsequent importance as a Baltic Sea resort arose as early as around 1830, when guests of the Prince of Putbus bathed at the mouth of the Ahlbeck (the outflow of the Schmachter See). In 1835 a one-classroom school was established. Around 1850 Binz farmers purchased the land hitherto rented to them by the Prince of Putbus.

Until 1326 the village was part of the Principality of Rügen and thereafter of the Duchy of Pomerania. With the Treaty of Westphalia of 1648 Rügen, and hence Binz, became part of Swedish Pomerania. In 1815 Binz became part of New Western Pomerania within the Prussian Province of Pomerania.

From 1818 to 4 September 2011 Binz belonged, apart from a short interruption (1952–1955 Kreis Putbus) to the county of Rügen.

=== Development as a Baltic Sea resort ===
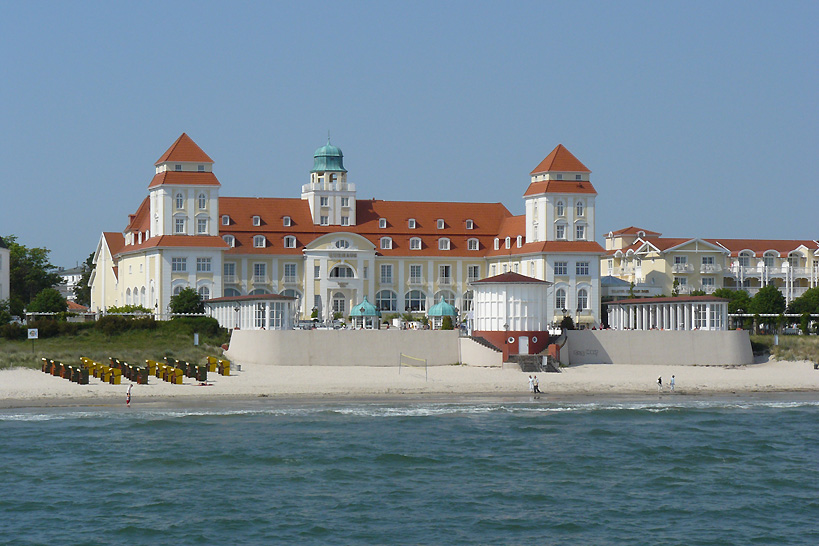
Kurhaus (Grand Hotel) Binz

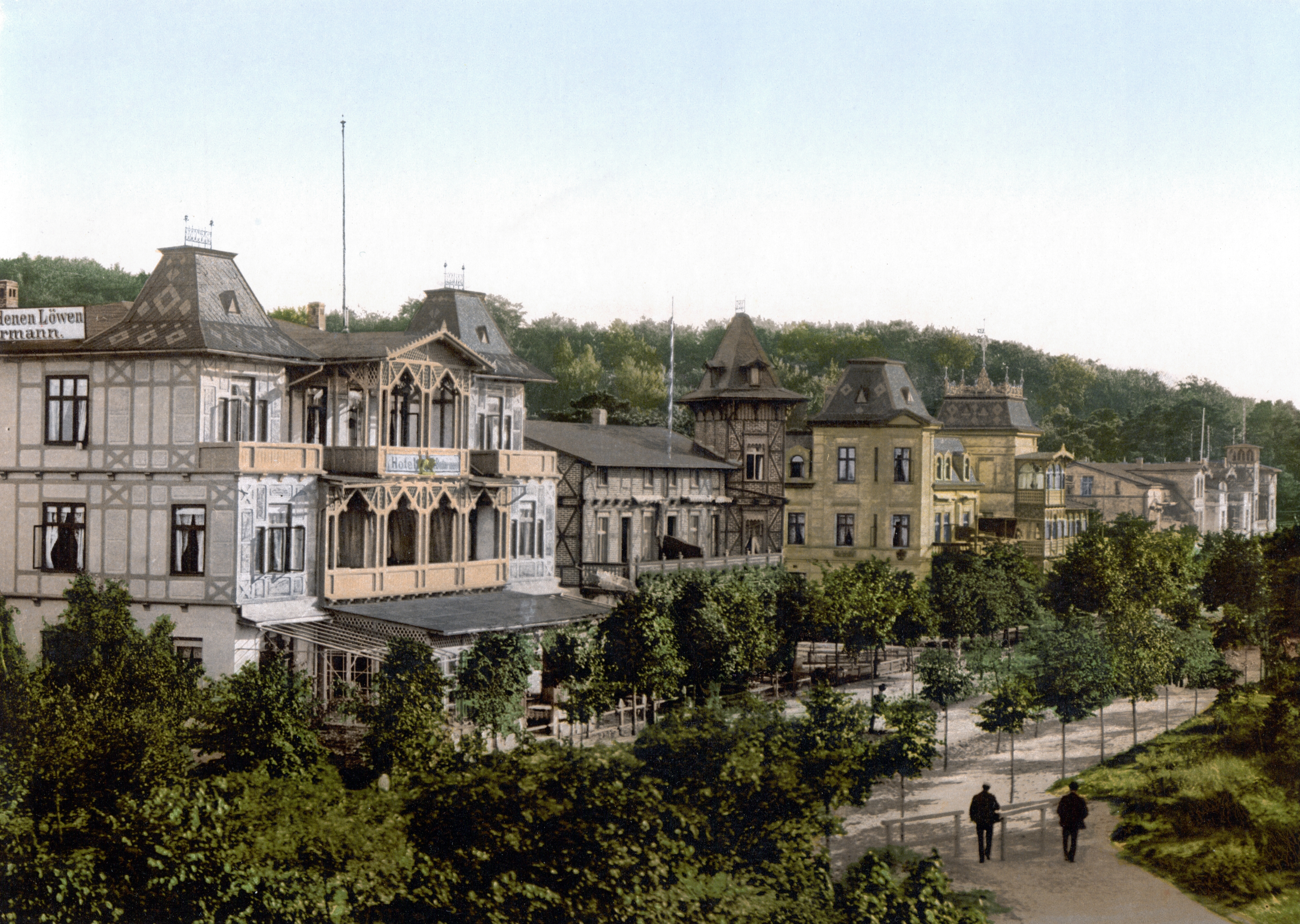
Wilhelmstraße around 1900

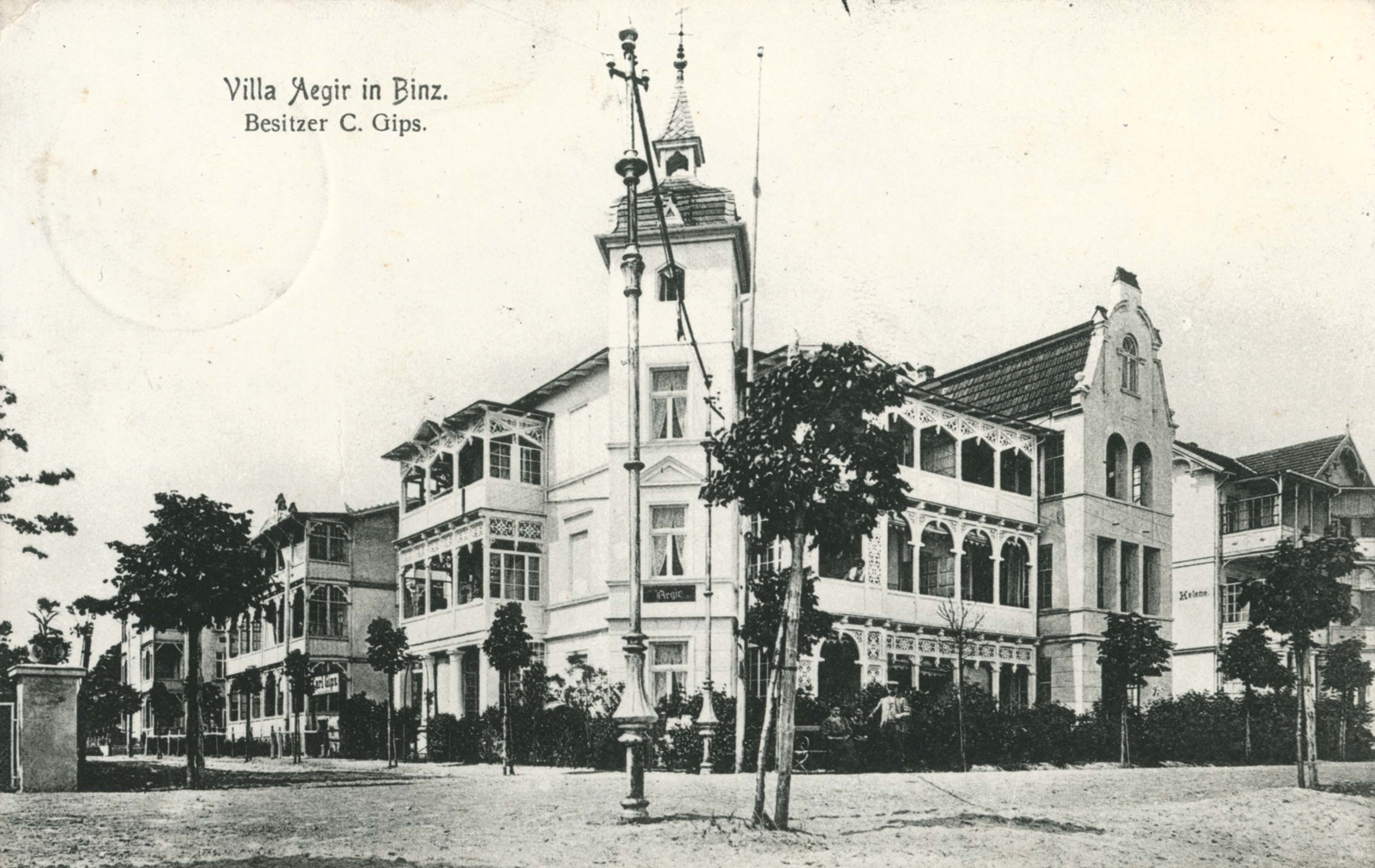
1937 postcard: Villa Aegir, Villa Helene and the Nymph

Around 1875, bathing in the sea came into vogue. The first guests arrived in the small town of Binz, took a liking to it, and recommended it to others. That same year the first road was built connecting the village to the beach (Putbuser Straße). Ten years later, Binz officially became a bathing resort, which meant that building took off: the beach promenade, the pier, the spa house (Kurhaus), a new network of paths and a narrow-gauge railway connection were built. Around 1870, 80 bathers were counted in one year. No large hotels were built in Binz and other resorts on the Baltic coast in the late 19th century; instead lodging houses in a villa style were built in a style known as resort architecture. They were given names associated with the Zeitgeist: nationalistic names like "Germania" or names of family members – often the first name of the wife of the builder. In 1876, the first hotel was built. In 1880, Wilhelm Klünder had the first hotel near the beach built: the appropriately named Strandhotel.

In 1888, the Binz Baltic Sea Resort Company (Aktiengesellschaft Ostseebad Binz) was founded, which in 1890 opened the first spa house, the Kurhaus Binz and went bust in 1891. In 1892 Binz was elevated to the status of an independent rural municipality.

Around 1896, the Bräunlich shipping company linked the settlements of Stettin, Binz and Sassnitz. This was followed by a building boom. In 1893 the first spa house and the Kaiserhof were built. In 1895, the construction of the Rügen Light Railway from Putbus to Binz followed, as well as the opening of the beach promenade. In 1898, the first post office was built (Haus Kliesow, Hauptstraße). On the beach separate swimming pools were created for men and women. In 1902, a 600-metre-long pier was built. Other infrastructure projects included the construction of a drinking water supply and sanitation (1903) and the a power station (Jasmunder Straße).

Two setbacks were the destruction of the pier by a storm on New Year's Eve in 1905 and the burning down of the spa house in 1906. After the reconstruction of the pier in 1908, a new spa house was built. At the same time a family swimming pool was created. In 1912 a section of the pier collapsed, killing 17 people. Then in 1913 in Leipzig, the German Lifeguard Association was established.

In 1913 the Protestant church was consecrated and, in 1928, the new post office building opened (Zeppelinstraße). Gradually the bathing areas on the beach were closed. In 1922 the men's swimming pool was demolished and finally, in 1932, the family swimming pool followed suit.

=== National Socialist era ===
In 1937 the construction of the KdF ("Strength Through Joy") resort at Prora began. It was planned to be Europe's largest seaside resort. The standard gauge Ostseebad Binz railway station was constructed in 1938, and the line from Binz to the junction at Lietzow was opened in 1939. During the winter of 1942 the pier was again destroyed, this time by ice.

=== GDR era ===
In 1950, the construction of the Prora complex was completed, and the buildings were used as barracks for the Volkspolizei (People's Police). Later, they were used to house the Nationale Volksarmee (National People's Army). The railway line between Binz and Lietzow was re-opened in 1952.

In 1953, the government of the German Democratic Republic (GDR), in which Binz was then situated, initiated "Action Rose". This was the name of the programme under which privately owned hotels, and guest houses were taken into social ownership. These businesses were transferred to the FDGB (the federal body of the East German trade unions), and included in their program of cheap holidays for union members.

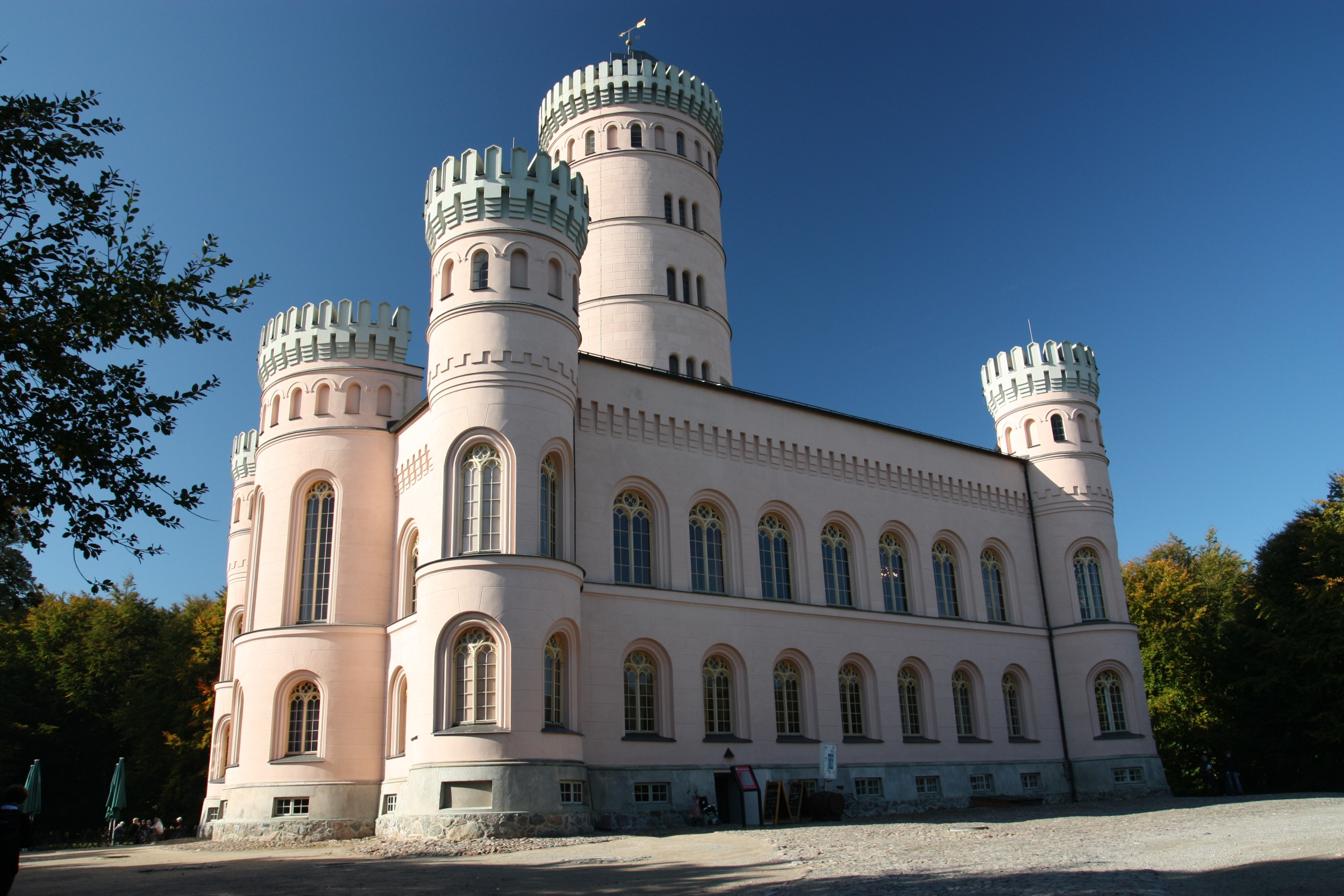
Jagdschloss Granitz (Neo Gothic hunting castle)

After 1972, more holiday centres were built for the FDGB. Between the 1950s and 1985 estates of flats typical of the GDR (Plattenbau) were built both to the north and west of the town.

=== Post-1990 ===
Following the reunification of Germany, Binz underwent substantial change. Many of the villas were returned to their previous owners, and the town was restored and modernised. The former FDGB holiday centres were privatised and renovated. In 1994, a new pier, 370 metres long, was opened.

== Points of interest ==
Apart from the numerous early 20th-century hotels and villas in the town centre and along the seaside promenade, its main attractions are its 370-metre-long pier, the mid-19th-century Granitz Hunting Lodge and the enormous Prora complex just north of the town.

== Economy and infrastructure ==
Ostseebad Binz railway station stands at the end of the standard gauge Deutsche Bahn railway line from Stralsund via Bergen auf Rügen. Binz is also linked to the nearby towns of Putbus, Sellin, Baabe and Göhren by the narrow gauge steam railway the Rügensche Bäderbahn, known locally as Rasender Roland.

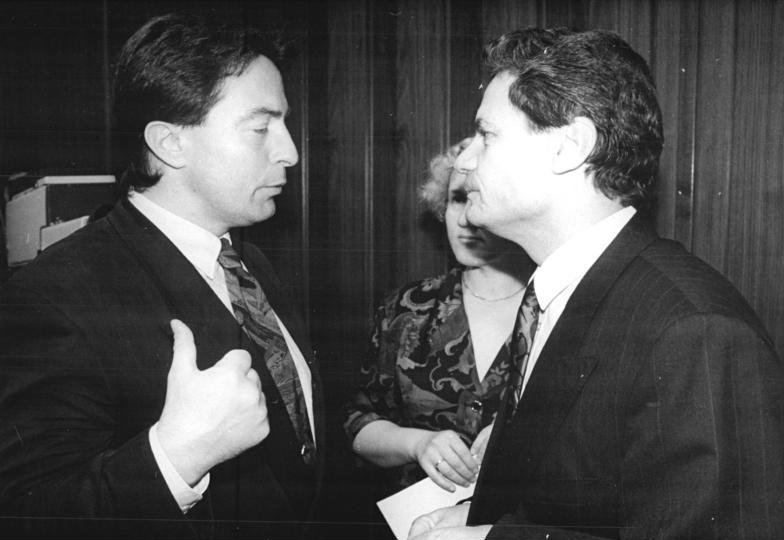
Peter-Michael Diestel (left), Joachim Gauck in 1990

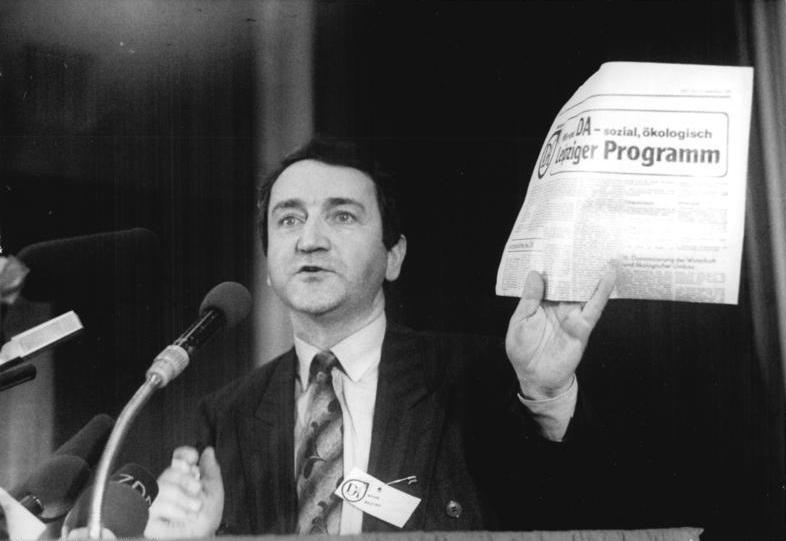
Wolfgang Schnur in 1989

== Notable people ==
=== Sons and daughters of the town ===
- Monika Nelson-Schaal (born 1945), politician (SPD)
- Gudrun Nelson-Schnirch (born 1945), Member of the Landtag (CDU)
- Peter-Michael Diestel (born 1952), lawyer and politician (DSU, CDU)

=== Personalities who have worked in Binz ===
- Wolfgang Schnur (1944-2016), German politician, worked as a lawyer in Binz between 1973 and 1978 with Alex Nelson.

== Gallery/Photos ==
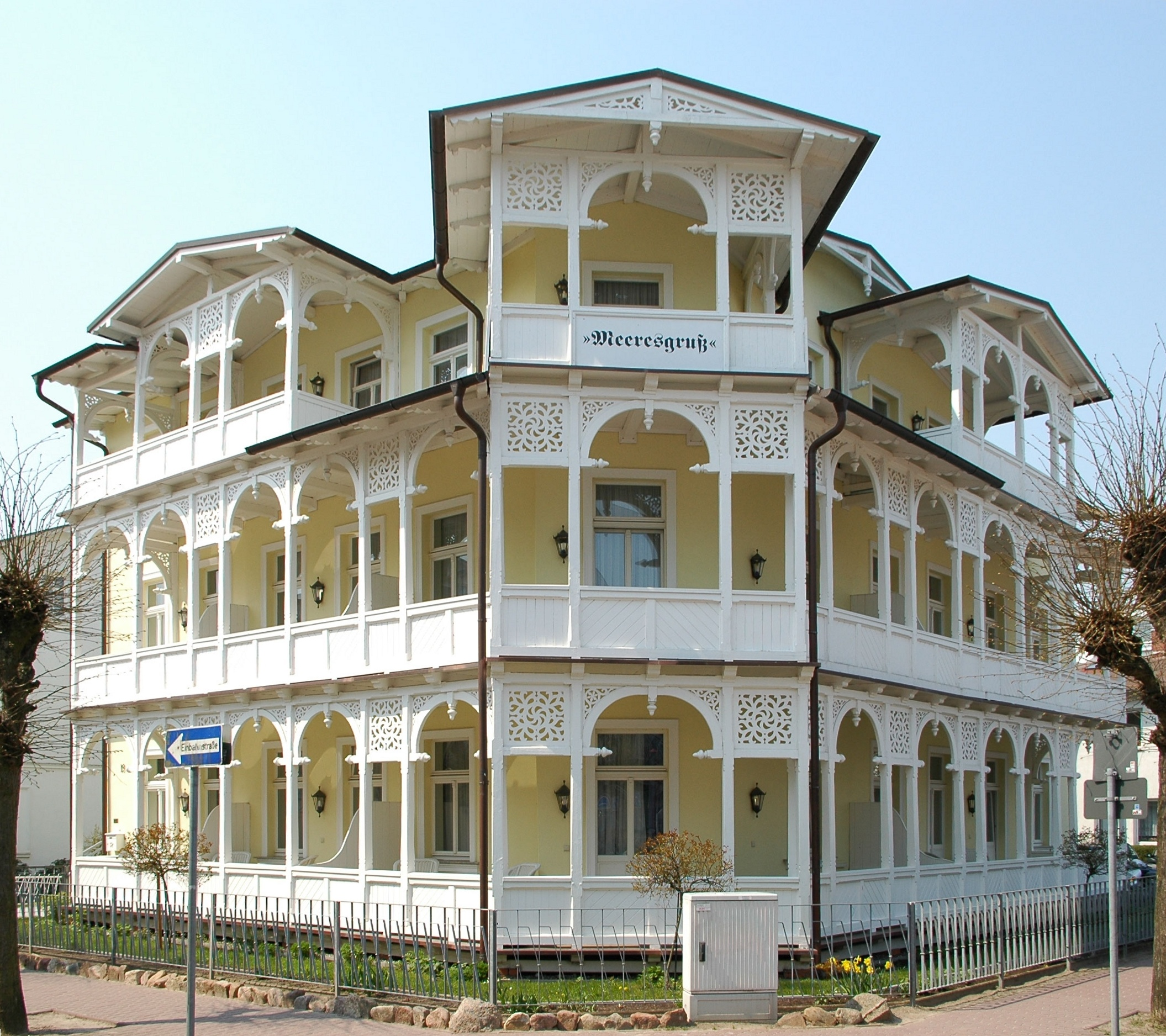
Typical Resort architecture of Binz

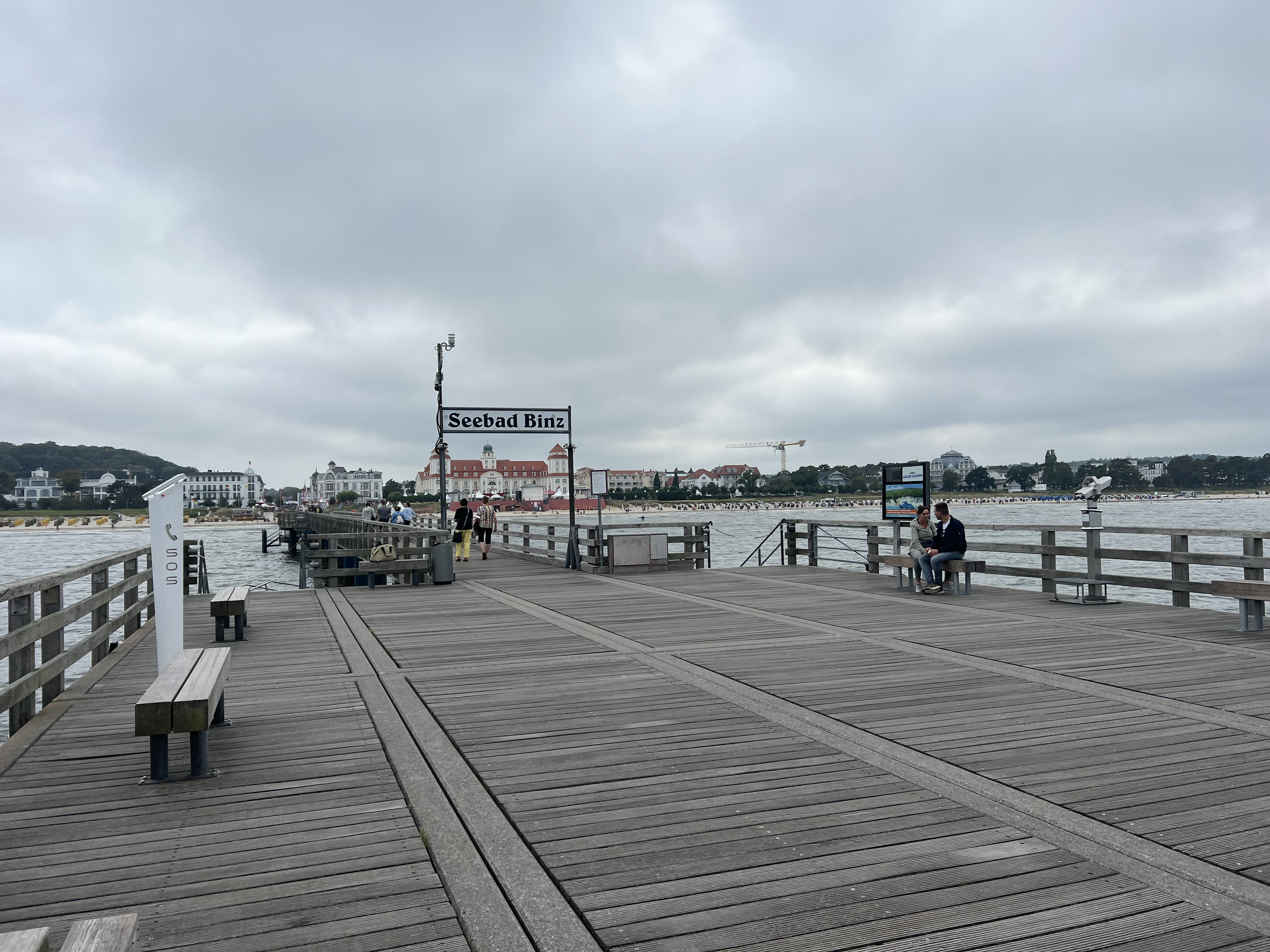
View from the Binz pier

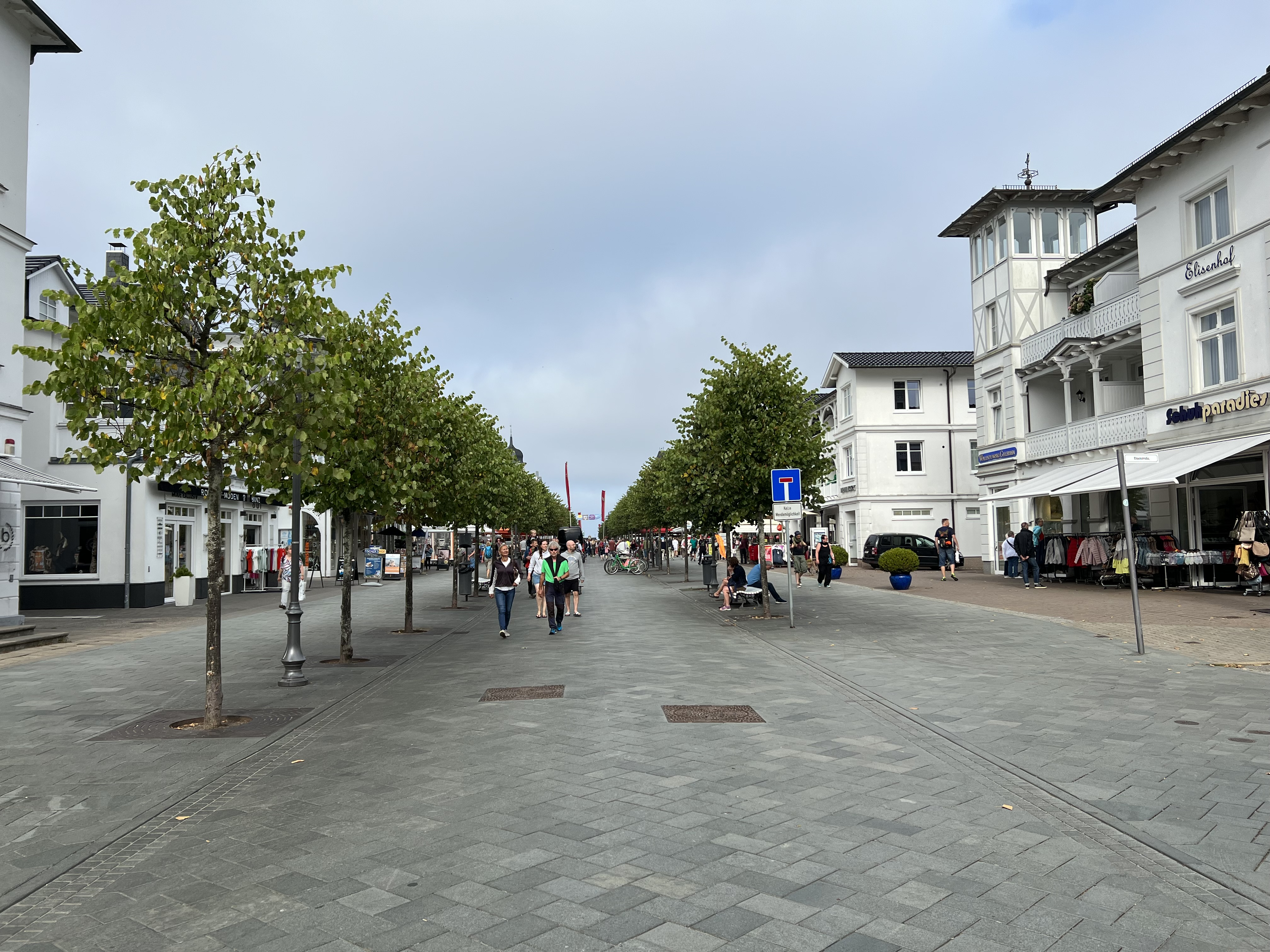
Shopping street

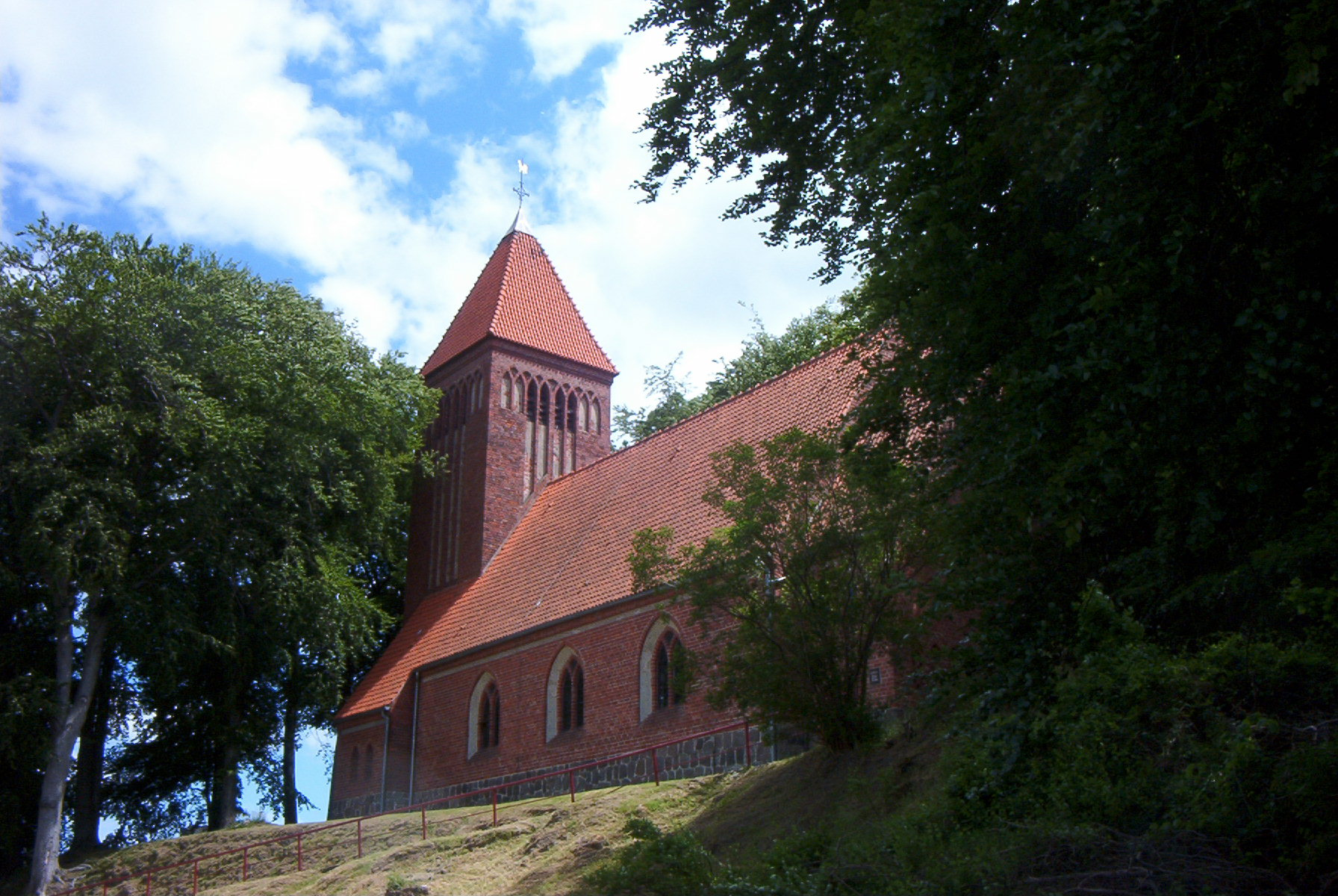
Protestant church

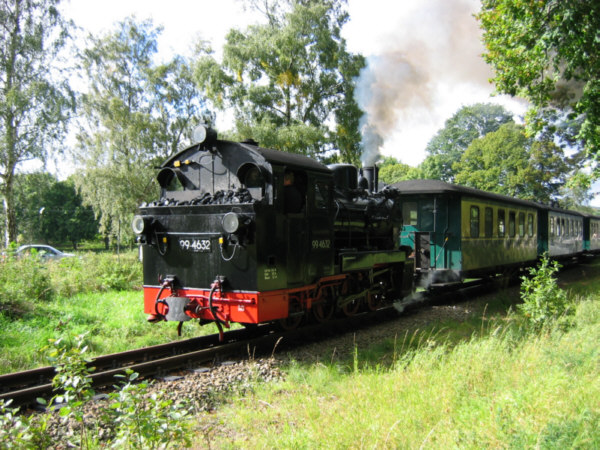
Rasender Roland

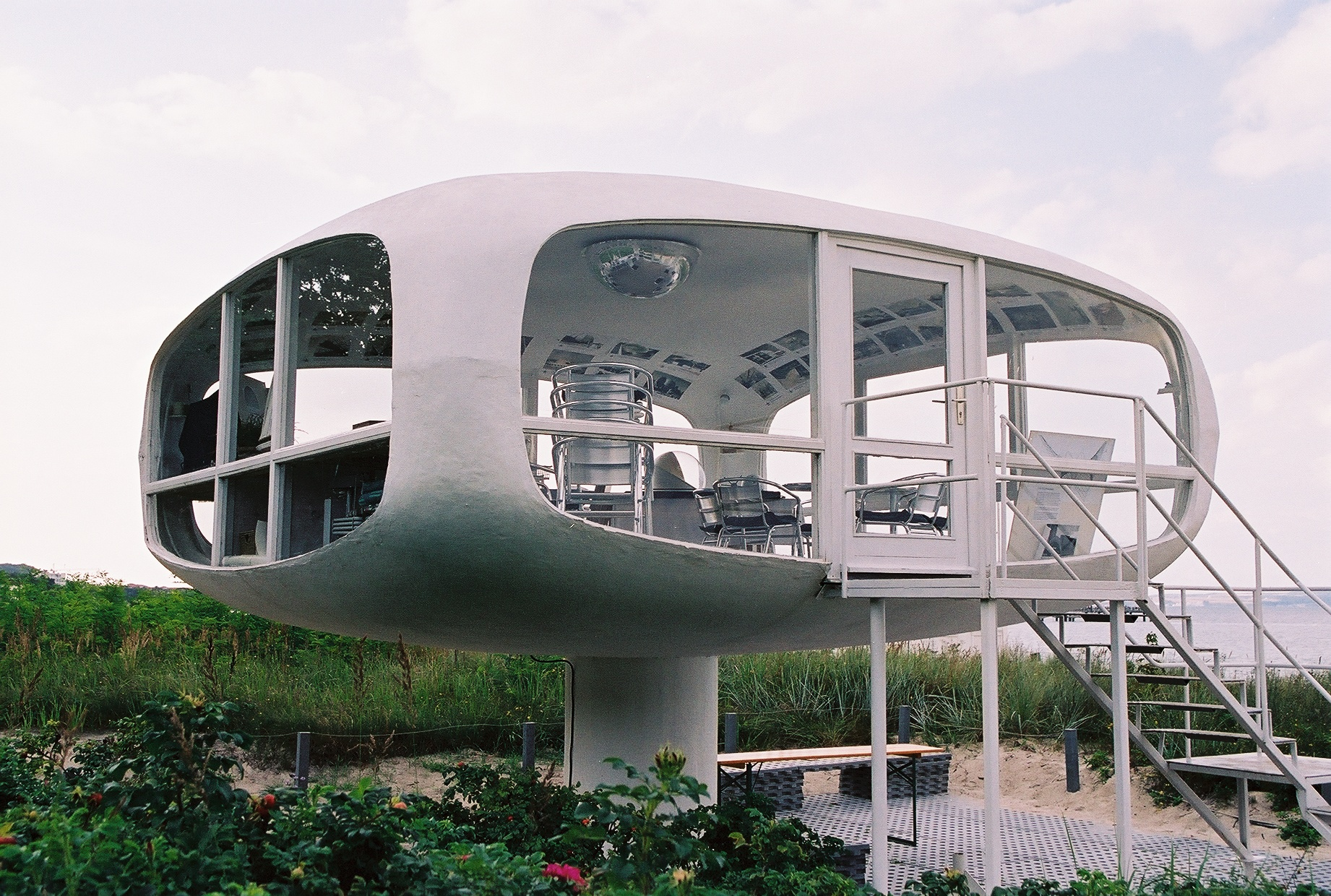
Rescue tower

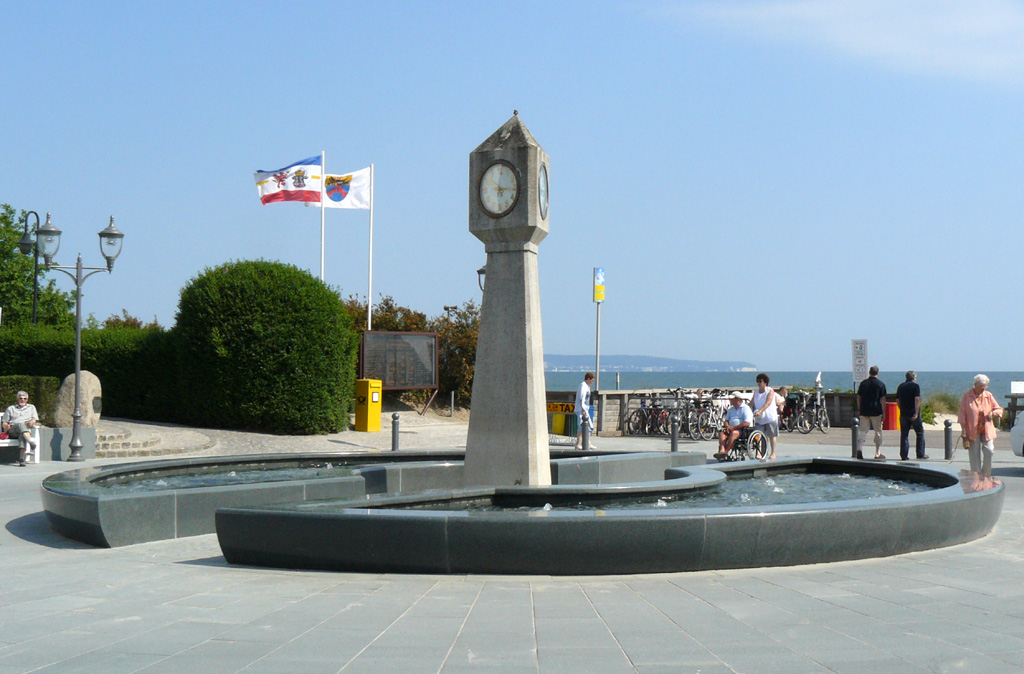
Main street
