= Schmachter See =

Lake in Mecklenburg-Vorpommern, Germany

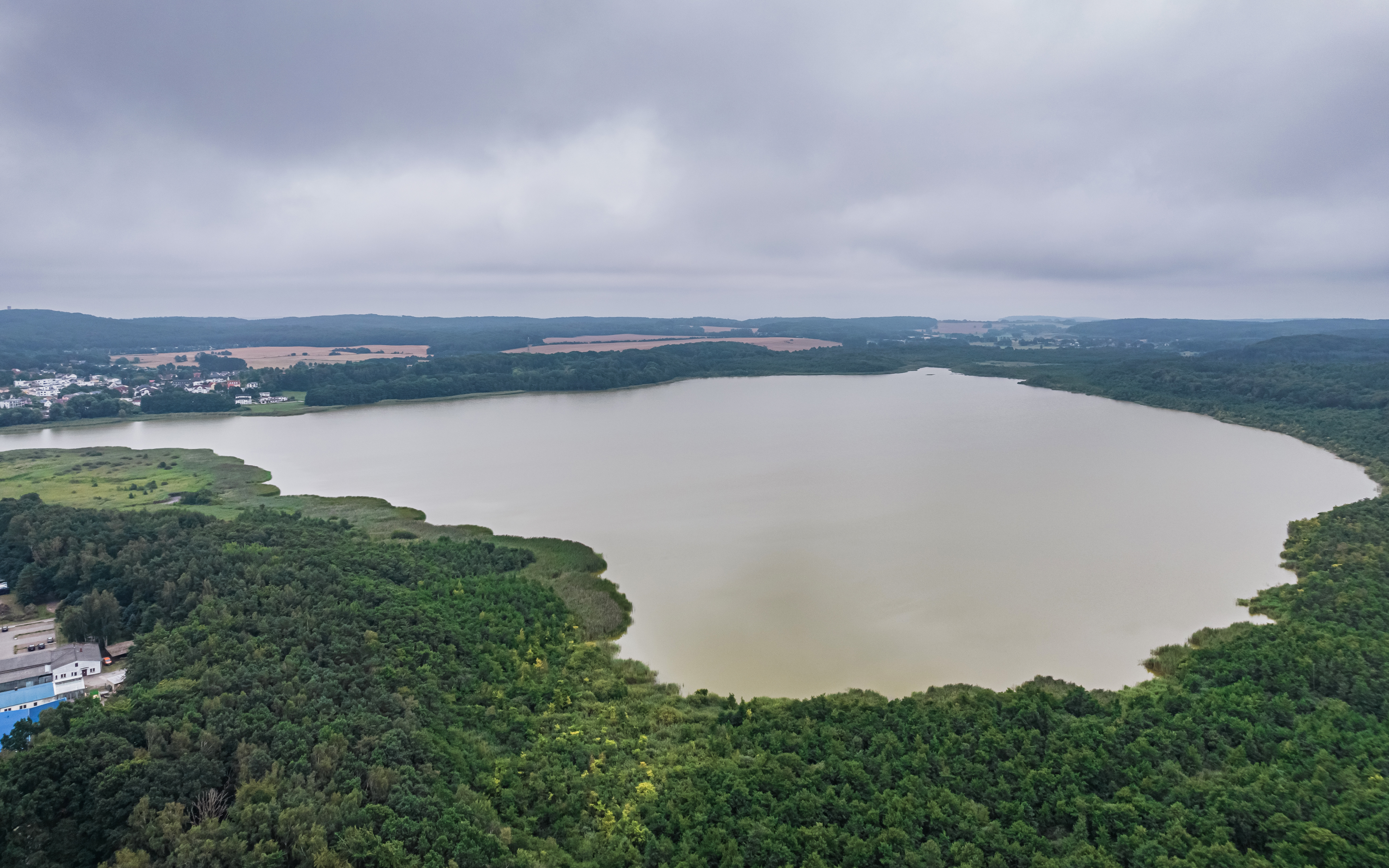
- Aerial view of the lake

- Location within Mecklenburg-Vorpommern
- Location: Vorpommern-Rügen, Mecklenburg-Vorpommern
- Coordinates: 54°23′48″N 13°35′49″E
- Primary inflows: none
- Primary outflows: Ahlbeck (canalised)
- Basin countries: Germany
- Surface area: 1.18 km^{2} (0.46 sq mi)
- Surface elevation: 1.1 m (3 ft 7 in)
- Settlements: Binz

Schmachter See is a lake near Binz on the German Baltic Sea island of Rügen. It lies within the county of Vorpommern-Rügen in the state of Mecklenburg-Vorpommern. It has an elevation of 1.1 metres above sea level and its surface area is 1.18 km^{2}. It is part of the Schmachter See and Fangerien Nature Reserve.

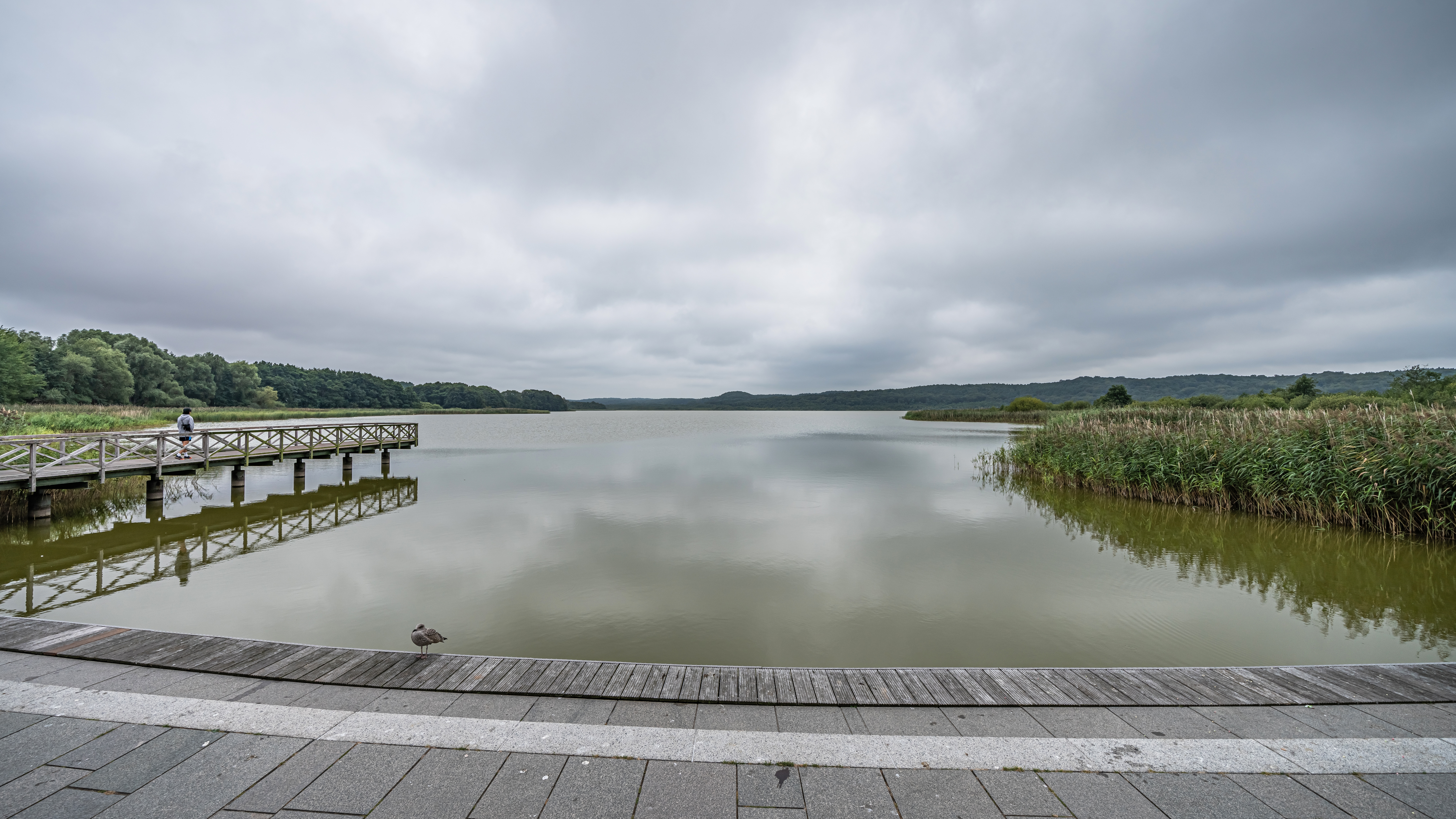
View from the promenade

The lake has its origins in the Ice Age. At the end of the glacial period there was an ice front here. Today the lake has an area of about 118 hectares. Before about 14,000 years ago the lake, which was then still part of the Baltic Sea, had a depth of up to 15 metres. About 5,000 years ago the waterbody was cut off from the Baltic by the bar of the Schmale Heide. Its only link to the Baltic is the drainage ditch of the Ahlbeck stream. As a result of natural silting-up processes it is today a shallow lake. In the centre it has a depth of only one to two metres. In addition the lake has lost a lot of its former area. Originally it purportedly reached as far south as Nistelitz. The name of the lake comes from the settlement of Schmacht to the southwest, but which no longer lies on the lake shore. The Ahlbeck, which drains the lake into the Baltic Sea, was canalised in the 1950s. The mouth of the pipe or ditch is located on the beach of Binzer Strand and is marked by an information sign.

A variety of animal and plant species live on the lake and, including 40 species on the IUCN Red List of Threatened Species. For example, the bittern reed warbler greylag goose, goosander, smew white-tailed eagle and osprey occur here.

The shores of the lake are mainly covered in beech woods. At the foot of the slopes are seepage springs. Close to the lake are alder carrs and marshes. The shore itself is mainly fringed by reeds and quaking bog vegetation.

At the northern end the lake is the village of Binz. Here, there is a promenade and the "Park of Senses" (Park der Sinne).

== Restoration project ==
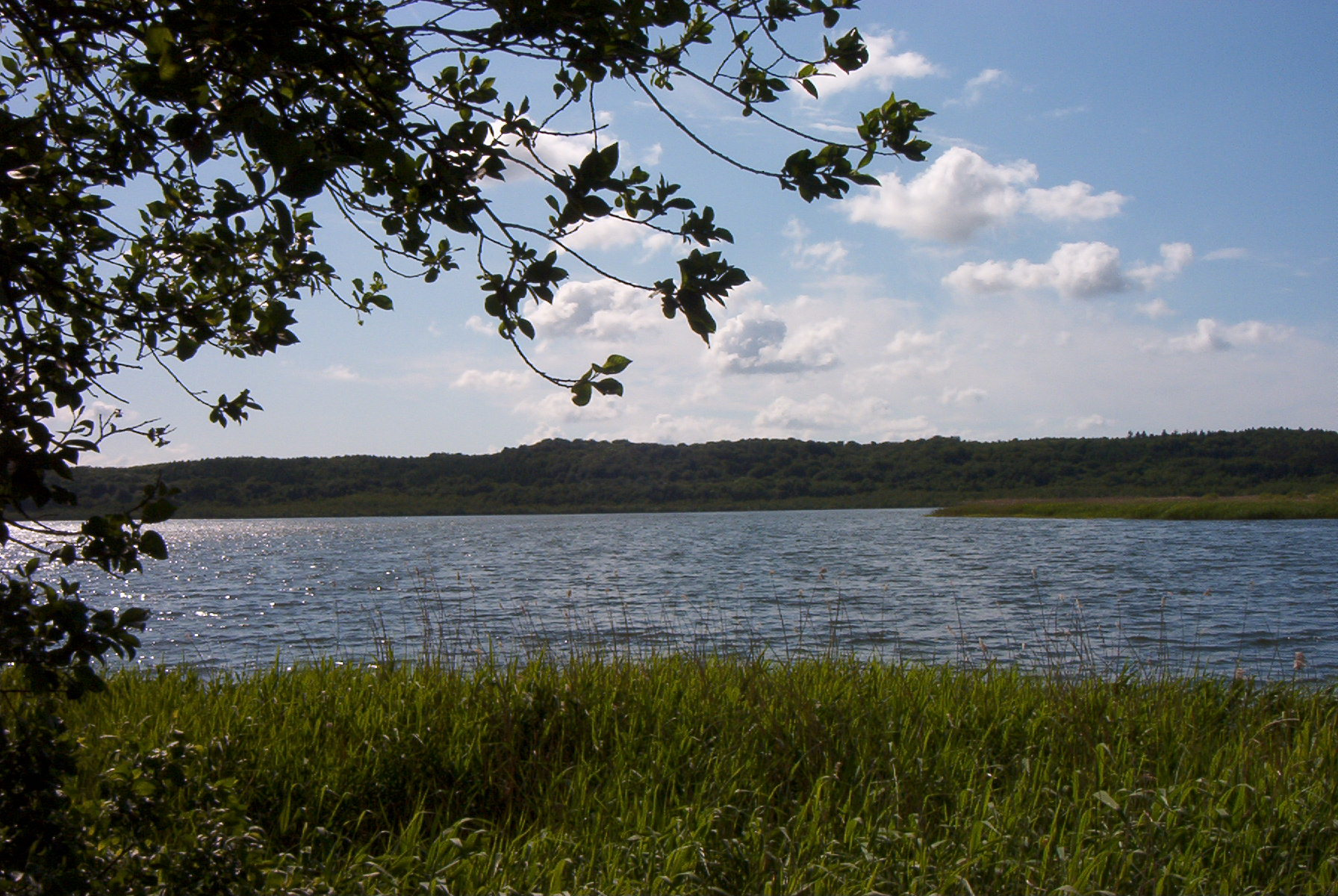
Southern shore

For many years effluents were discharged into the lake from a since-closed sewage farm. In addition, fertiliser chemicals entered it as a result of agriculture. The lake thus suffered from eutrophication to such an extent that by 1990 the ecology had become unstable. It had caused heavy silting. As part of a project sponsored by the municipality of Binz and the East Rügen Rural Conservation Association (Landschaftspflegeverband Ostrügen), 300,000 cubic metres of lake mud will be removed. In addition, phosphorus will be removed from 1.45 million cubic metres of sea water.

After completion of the project, a nutrient-poor, macrophyte-dominated freshwater lake will be created.

In the course of renovation in 2008 piping for the canalised Ahlbeck stream was replaced. A total of 450 metres of iron pipe was laid from the Schmachter See to the seabed of the Baltic.
