= Erfurt–Leipzig/Halle high-speed railway =

Train infrastructure in Germany

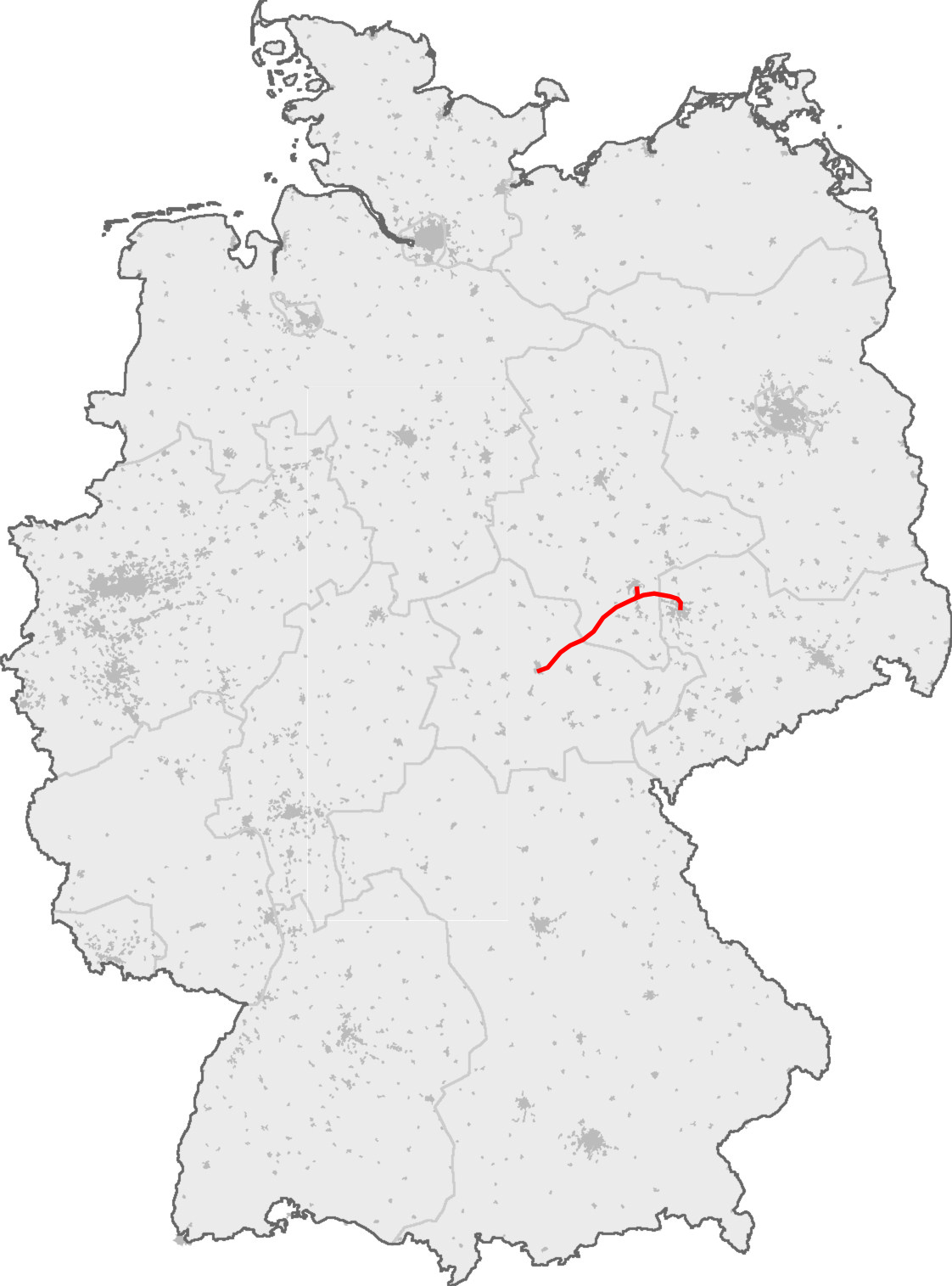

Overview
- Native name: Neubaustrecke Erfurt–Leipzig/Halle
- Line number: 5919 (Eltersdorf–Leipzig Hbf); 6394 (Planena–Halle-Ammendorf)
- Locale: Thuringia, Saxony-Anhalt and Saxony, Germany

Service
- Route number: 580

History
- Opened: 9 December 2015

Technical
- Line length: 120.818 km (75.073 mi) (Erfurt Hbf–Leipzig Hbf); 3.614 km (2.246 mi) (Planena–Halle-Ammendorf)
- Number of tracks: 2
- Track gauge: 1,435 mm (4 ft 8 1/2 in) standard gauge
- Minimum radius: standard: 6,300 m (20,700 ft); reduced minimum: 4,827 m (15,837 ft)
- Electrification: 15 kV/16.7 Hz AC; Overhead catenary
- Operating speed: *5919: 300 km/h (186 mph); *6394: 160 km/h (100 mph)
- Maximum incline: 1.25%

The Erfurt–Leipzig/Halle high-speed railway is a 123 km (76 mi)-long high-speed line in Germany between Erfurt and Leipzig and Halle, built as part of the Berlin–Munich high-speed railway.

It is listed in Germany's Federal Transport Plan (Bundesverkehrswegeplan) as "German Unity Rail Project no 8.2" (Verkehrsprojekt Deutsche Einheit Schiene, VDE 8.2) and is a section of the Munich–Berlin high-speed route, part of the Line 1 of Trans-European Transport Networks (TEN-T) and on the east–west axis between Dresden and Frankfurt. To the north, it connects with the previously completed Berlin-Halle and Leipzig railways (VDE 8.3) and to in the south with the Nuremberg-Erfurt high-speed railway (VDE 8.1), which was opened in December 2017. The travel time from Munich to Berlin has been reduced to about four hours.

The design speed is largely 300 km/h (186 mph), reduced to 160 km/h (100 mph) on the branch to Halle. 15.4 km (9.6 mi) of the 123 km (76 mi)-long high-speed line is located in three tunnels; the six viaducts of the route together are more than 14.4 km (8.9 mi) long. With a length of approximately 6,465 metres (21,211 ft), the Saale-Elster Viaduct is the longest bridge structure in Germany and the longest bridge on a long-distance railway in Europe. The Unstrut Viaduct at 2,668 m (8,753 ft) is the second longest railway bridge in Germany.

Scheduled operations commenced on 13 December 2015. This shortened the journey times for ICE services over the 121 kilometres (75 mi) between Erfurt and Leipzig from 70 to 43 minutes and the 92 kilometres (57 mi) between Erfurt and Halle from 75 to 34 minutes.

The cost of the project was estimated in mid 2014 to be €2.967 billion.

== Lines ==
=== Route ===
The line runs east from Erfurt Hauptbahnhof parallel with the Halle–Bebra railway. The two lines pass through the southern edge of Erfurt marshalling yard and past that Vieselbach freight distribution centre (Güterverkehrszentren), which lies to the south of the existing line in Azmannsdorf. West of Vieselbach the new line leaves the existing line and runs in a northeasterly direction. When passing through the Thuringian basin, it passes the towns of Großmölsen, Neumark, Krautheim and Buttstädt. Apart from the Scherkonde Viaduct (576.5 m (1,891 ft)) and the Gänsebach Viaduct (1,001 m (3,284 ft)), the line in this section has no major engineering structure. The Großbrembach overtaking loop lies between the two viaducts.

The line reached the Finne ridge in Herrengosserstedt and runs through the Finne Tunnel (6,965 m (22,851 ft)) between Rastenberg and Bad Bibra. After a short section that includes the Saubachtal overtaking loop the line passes over the Saubach Viaduct (248 m (814 ft)). This is immediately followed by the Bibra Tunnel (6,466 m (21,214 ft)), where the line passes below the Hermundurische Scholle plateau and comes to the surface again east of the Dissa valley. Northwest of Wetzendorf, the line crosses the valley of the Unstrut on the 2,668 m (8,753 ft)-long Unstrut Viaduct. It then passes through the Osterberg Tunnel (2,082 m (6,831 ft)), which ends at Kalzendorf, and the Jüdendorf overtaking loop. It then runs across the plateau of the Querfurt Plate (Querfurter Platte), and no further major engineering structures are required on the line apart from the Stöbnitz Viaduct (297 m (974 ft)). In Bad Lauchstädt, it passes under autobahn 38 and reaches the Dörstewitz overtaking loop.

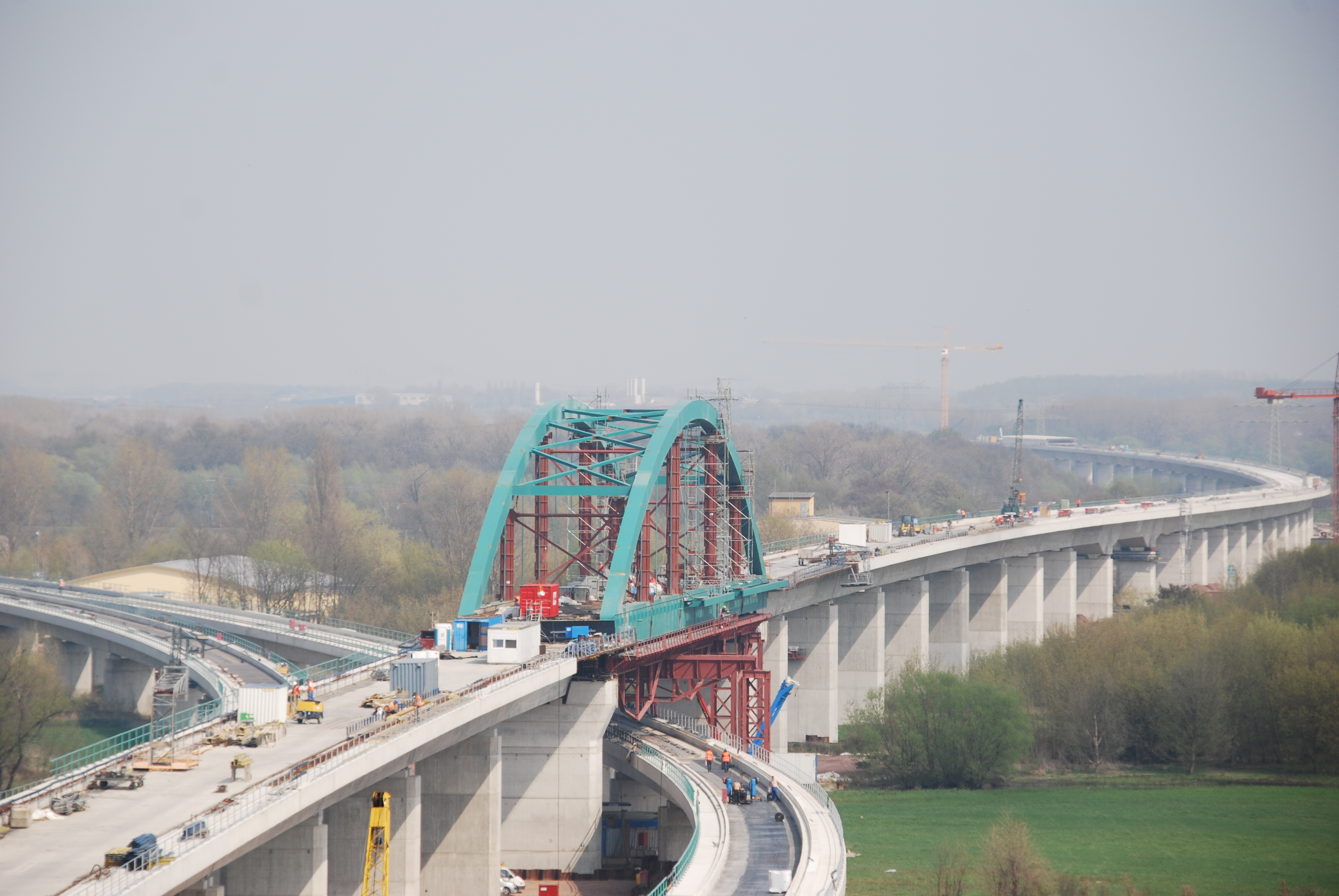
Branch of the routes to Halle (below) and Leipzig (above) on the Saale-Elster Viaduct

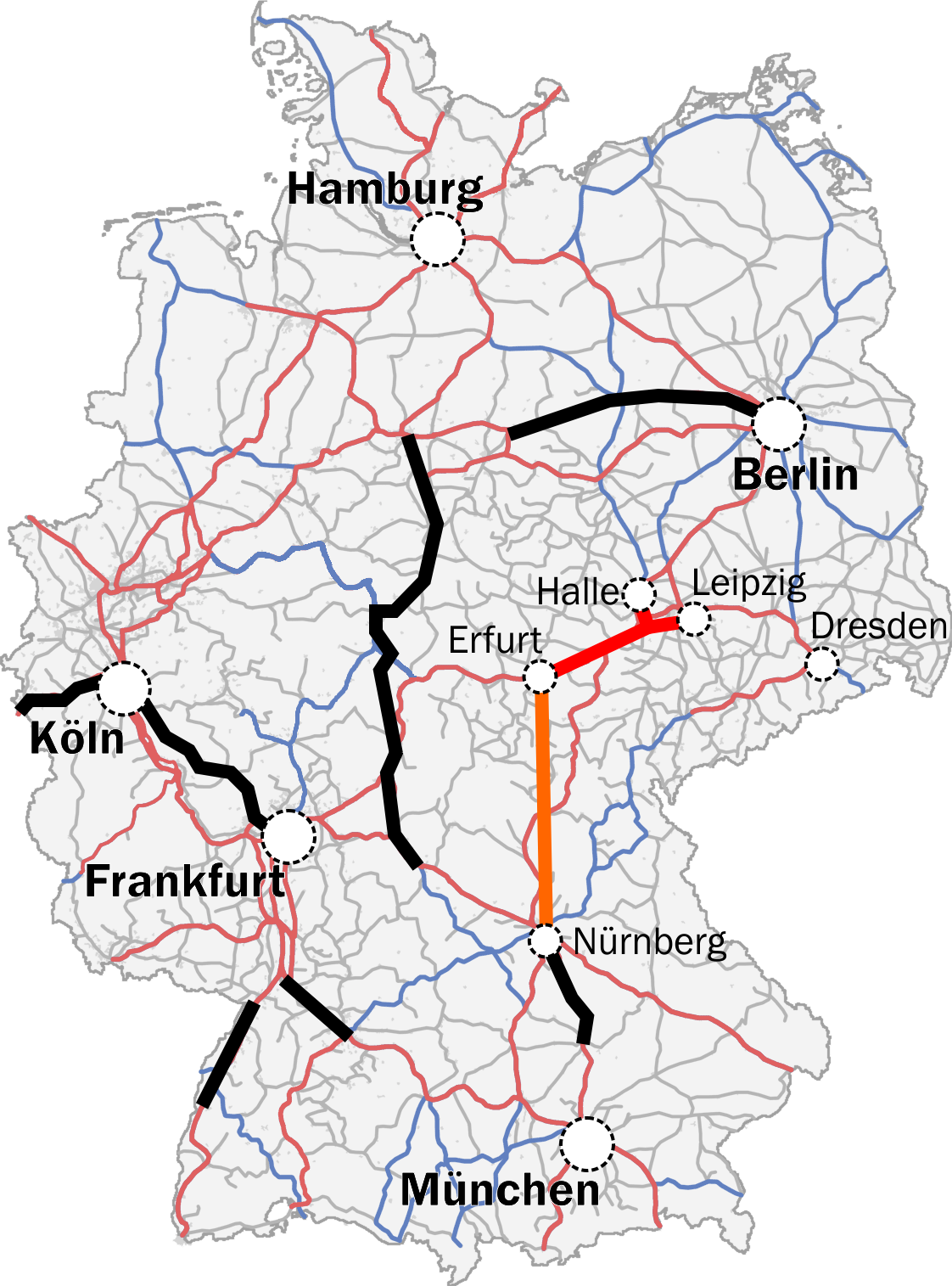
Location of the new line (red) in the existing network

The Saale-Elster Viaduct crosses the floodplains of the Saale and White Elster over a length of 6,465 m (21,211 ft), starting in Schkopau. The building of the longest bridge in Germany through several protected areas was particularly complex due to the Habitats Directive (Council Directive 92/43/EEC), a bird sanctuary and a drinking water protection zone grade III, which together required numerous applications of administrative law. Another special feature of the infrastructure is the grade-separated junction with the link to Halle (Saale) via a 2,112 m (6,929 ft) long viaduct, with a viaduct for the track towards Halle passing under the main viaduct. The branch connects with the existing Halle–Bebra railway at Ammendorf/Beesen. Halle (Saale) Hauptbahnhof is connected to the new line over a link with a total length of 8.9 km (5.5 mi).

The line towards Leipzig adopts a course without major engineering structures. In Gröbers, it has a grade-separated crossing over the tracks of the Mitteldeutschland S-Bahn and the Magdeburg-Leipzig Railway and there are connections between these lines at Gröbers junction. Before reaching Leipzig/Halle Airport, which has two outside platforms, it passes over Autobahn 9 on a bridge near the Schkeuditz Cross interchange (Schkeuditzer Kreuz). The line runs next to Autobahn 14 for nearly 13 km (8.1 mi) (kilometres 290–303) before turning off the A14 to approach Leipzig Messe station. After another six kilometres of upgraded line (Ausbaustrecke), the line ends in Leipzig Hauptbahnhof.

=== Design parameters ===
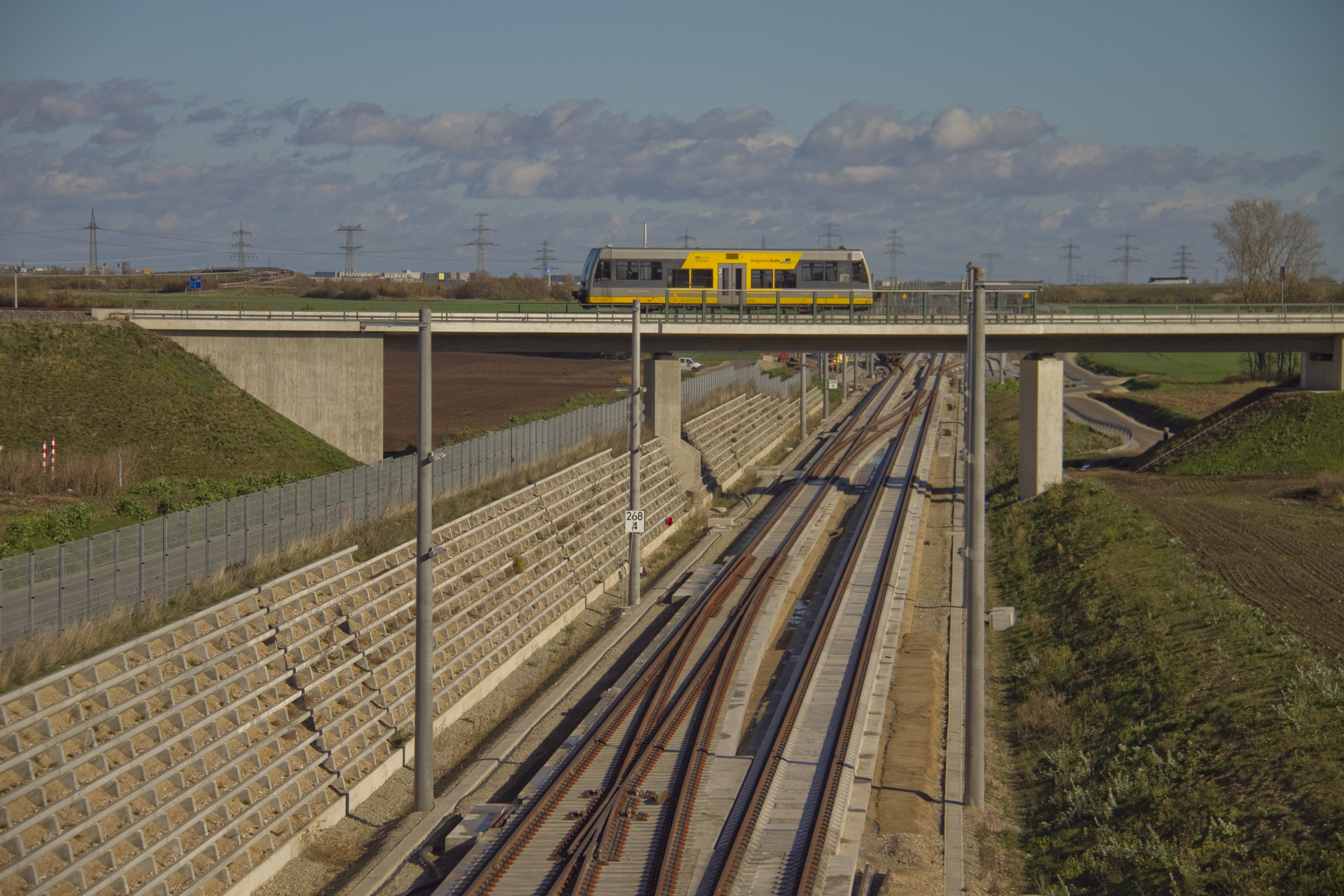
Passing under the Merseburg-Schafstädt railway at the Dörstewitz overtaking facility

The design speed is 300 km/h (186 mph) between Erfurt and Gröbers near Halle. Between Gröbers and Leipzig Messe, the line speed is 250 km/h (155 mph) and, between Leipzig Messe and Leipzig Hauptbahnhof, the line speed is 160 km/h (100 mph). To allow this, the course of the line was planned with a reduced minimum curve radius of 4,287 m (14,065 ft) and a normal minimum curve radius of 6,300 m (20,700 ft). The gradient of the new line is up to 1.25%.

As of 1995, the width of the track formation for planning purposes, depending on track curvature, was between 13.30 and 13.70 m (43 ft 8 in and 44 ft 11 in) and a distance between track centres was 4.70 m (15 ft 5 in). The latter was later reduced to 4.50 m (14 ft 9 in). The reduced minimum vertical curve radius was 22,500 m (14.0 mi) with a normal minimum vertical curve radius of 25,000 m (16 mi).

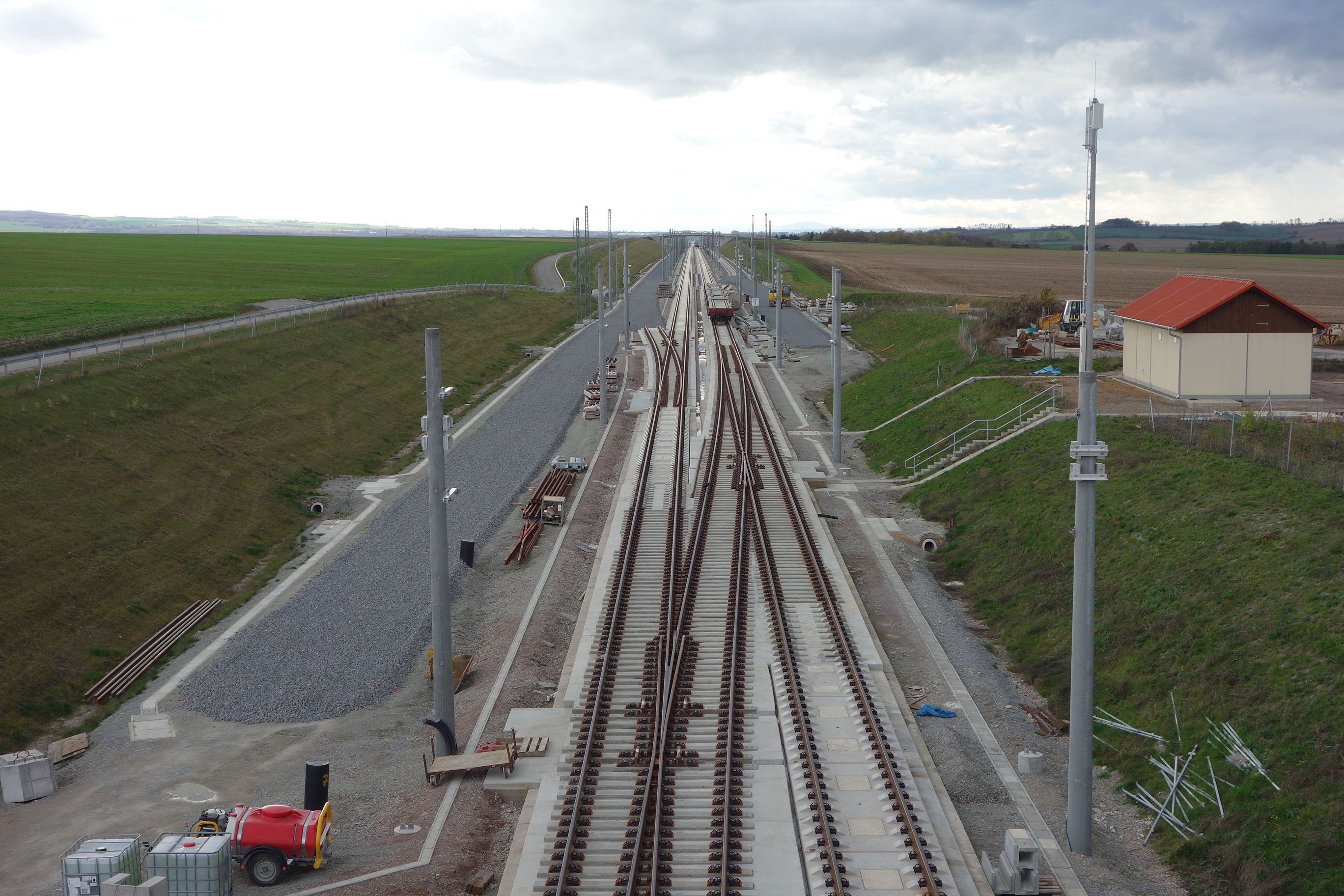
Großbrembach overtaking loop with slab track and ballasted track (under construction in October 2013)

Following the planning stage of 1995, overtaking loops were provided at intervals of about 20 km (12 mi) and crossovers at intervals of about seven kilometres. With the adoption of the four planned overtaking loop facilities (Überholbahnhöfe), the proposed crossovers could be dispensed with. Ballastless track is used for the continuous main tracks. The crossovers that are incorporated in the overtaking loop facilities at Großbrembach, Jüdendorf and Dörstewitz are designed for operations at 130 km/h (81 mph) and the turnout speed to the passing tracks is 100 km/h (62 mph). Because of the confined situation between the Finne Tunnel and the Bibra Tunnel the maximum speed in the Saubachtal overtaking loop is only 100 km/h (62 mph).

The distances required between overtaking loops were determined in an operational scientific study and were calculated according to track information based on the forecast program of operations.

=== Engineering structures ===
The maximum height of embankments is 15 m (49 ft 3 in) and the maximum depth of cuttings is 20 m (65 ft 7 in) (DB guideline 836). Bridges and tunnels were provided where these values could not be complied with. Overall, 35 rail bridges and 39 road bridges were built in the course of the project. A special feature is the design of four major bridges as "semi-integral" bridges. The pier and superstructure are monolithically connected, but, in contrast to integral bridges, there are joints in the superstructure.

The three tunnels extend for a total distance of 15.4 km (9.6 mi). Because of the geological conditions, the planned mixed traffic and for safety reasons they were built as two tubes carrying a single track with track centres spaced by about 25 m (82 ft 0 in). Connecting tunnels were built between them as escape routes at a maximum distance of 500 m (1,600 ft). Structural measures against tunnel boom were built where required in the portal areas.

The six viaducts have a total length of 14.4 km (8.9 mi). Originally they were to be 11.3 km (7.0 mi) long. In 1994, five major bridges were planned with a length of around ten kilometres.

=== Technology ===
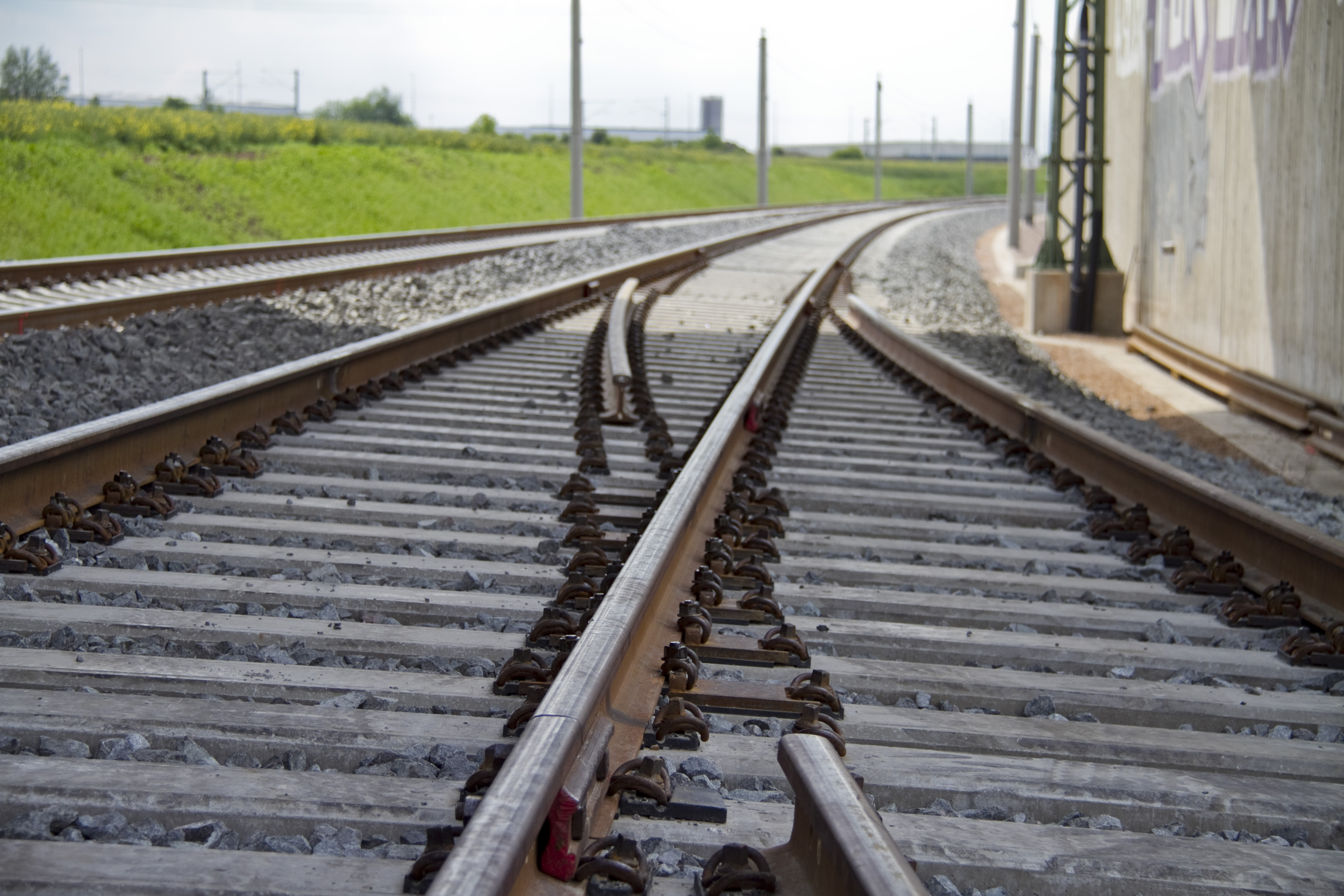
A special feature for a German high-speed line is the frog and centerpiece-free set of points at the junction with the siding to Erfurt-Vieselbach substation, with operations possible at 200 km/h on the main line.

The line is subject to the Technical Specification for Interoperability as part of the trans-European high-speed railway network.

The line is controlled by electronic interlockings (Elektronische Stellwerke, ESTW) that are remotely controlled by the Leipzig operations centre. This is assisted by the Erfurt Neubaustrecke sub-centre (ESTW-UZ) for the line outside the Erfurt/Halle/Leipzig nodes and four branch offices (ESTW-A) built at the overtaking loops. After the planning stage in 1997, it was still intended to build eleven substations (ESTW-A).

The route is between Erfurt Hbf and Leipzig Messe is equipped with European Train Control System (ETCS). For the first time in Germany, ETCS Level 2 has been used without trackside signals and with no signal-based fallback. 1352 Eurobalises have been installed with special mountings for protection from impacts. The four ETCS control centres (two in Erfurt, one each in Halle and Neuwiederitzsch) are designed as "two out of three" computer systems to deal with malfunctions. In an ETCS failure, the trains continue to operate under the ETCS Staff Responsible mode. An integrated user interface has been developed for the operation of the electronic interlockings and ETCS control centres. As a fallback to ETCS, an intermittent train control system (Punktförmige Zugbeeinflussung) was modelled, which would allow operations outside of stations with turnouts at speeds of up 160 km/h (100 mph). Procedures were also developed for dealing with a malfunctioning GSM-R Base transceiver station, so that trains can be run through.

The line was first put into operation with ETCS version SRS 2.3.0d (with additional changes), and it was initially scheduled to be upgraded to full functionality under ETCS Baseline 3 at the end of 2017. Therefore, only specifically approved vehicles (such as the ICE T and some railway service vehicles) may operate on this route. The upgrade program has changed and, instead, further developments are to be carried out on the basis of baseline 2. A full installation of ETCS at the Erfurt, Halle and Leipzig junctions was tested, and ultimately the Erfurt junction was partially equipped with ETCS.

15 GSM-R base stations were built along the line at intervals of six to eight kilometres comprising new and adapted existing base stations. In addition radio field amplifiers were built.

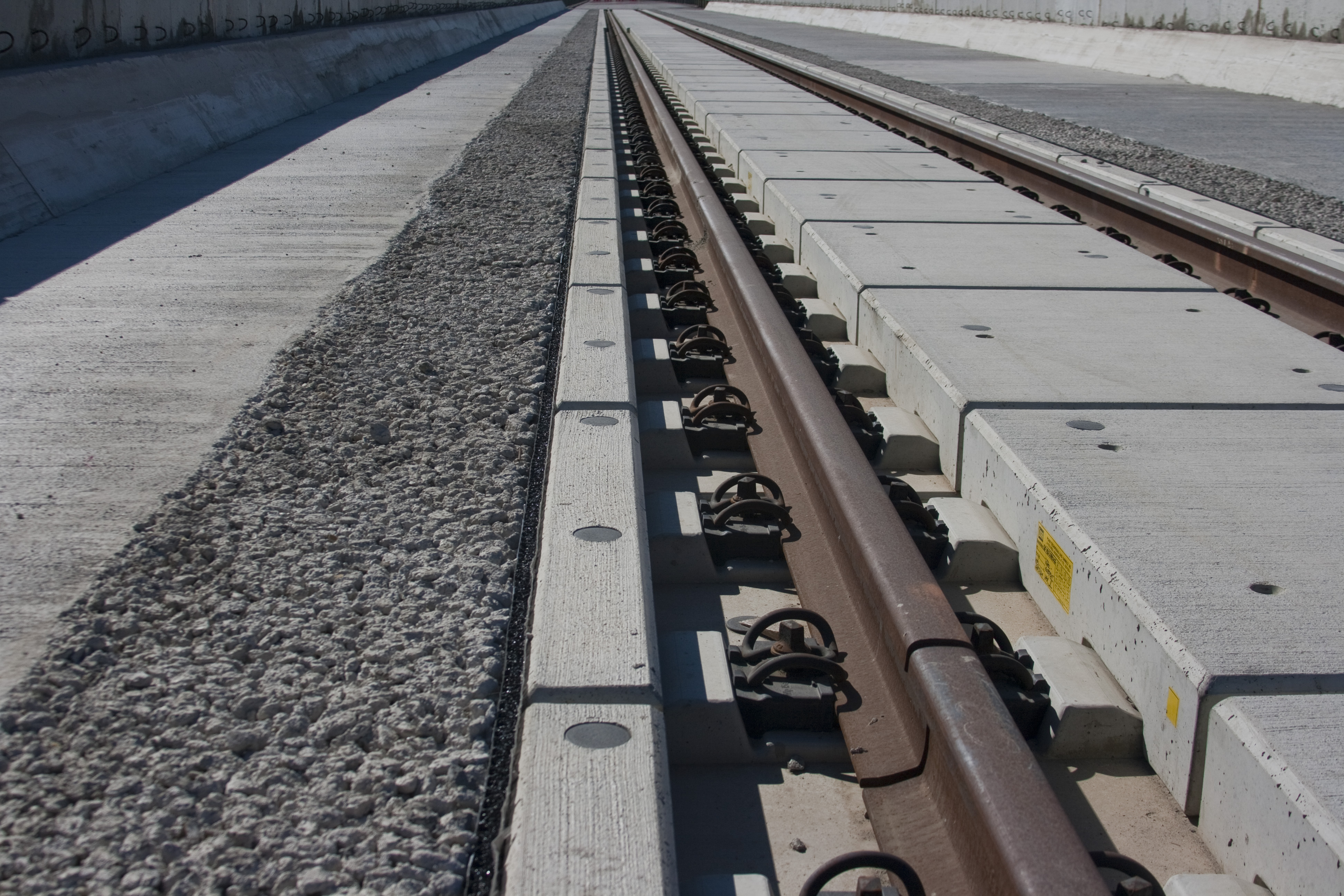
Slab track roadway for rescue vehicles

The new line is built as slab track with the overtaking tracks and connections with the existing network built as conventional ballasted tracks. 34,000 sections of slab tracks were laid for the line. In the tunnels and on the Saale-Elster Viaduct this is designed to be usable by emergency road vehicles. These new designs were tested on a specially built test track. Trains must be equipped with emergency brakes between Großbrembach and Jüdendorf.

Three new substations for the supply of traction power were built near Bachstedt, in the Saubach valley area and near Dörstewitz. Further, railway power lines with a length of 93 km (58 mi) were built (according to another source, 85 km (53 mi)). Originally four substations and 85 km (53 mi) of railway power line were planned. The Weimar substation was upgraded.

The new line was equipped with catenary of class Re 330 between early 2011 and the end of September 2014. Around 3,000 overhead masts were required for this. The section completed in 2003 between Leipzig Messe and Gröbers was built with class SICAT 1.0 catenary.

== History ==
=== Background ===
A trunk line between Berlin and Munich was included in Friedrich List's proposed German rail network in 1833. The line that was completed between Berlin and Munich in 1851 was not built to an overall plan, but was a result of the development of various rail networks in the 1840s and was mainly built to promote regional interests.

Since line improvements and technical developments were affected by the division of Germany, which also meant that the line was cut at the border. After the reunification, attention turned to closing gaps, restoration, rehabilitation and electrification of the existing lines.

Today's railway line is the result of a decision of the Federal Government in April 1991 to fund the "German Unity Transport Projects", which were incorporated in the Federal Transport Infrastructure Plan (Bundesverkehrswegeplan) 1992. The project was listed as one of the "new projects" with a total projected cost of DM 4765 million (1 January 1991 prices). It was listed as an "urgent need" in the Federal Railway Development Act 1993 (Bundesschienenwegeausbaugesetz). The line was originally intended to be implemented by 2000. In 1994, it was included in the newly created Berlin–Verona Trans-European Corridor at the EU summit in Essen.

According to Deutsche Bahn, the need to establish the route arose among other things from traffic forecasts, which predicted rapidly increasing passenger and freight traffic between Berlin, Leipzig, Erfurt, Nuremberg and Munich. These traffic volumes could not be handled with the existing infrastructure. The quality of operation of existing routes would be unsatisfactory, partly due to heavy use and long service times. An upgrade of existing routes to overcome these problems would hardly be possible. Line improvements would usually have significant environmental impacts and would have strong impacts on existing buildings, due partly to dense settlement in the narrow valleys that the line passes through. The requirements of a modern railway in terms of traveling times and speeds could not be achieved by upgrading existing routes.

=== Planning and option selection ===
Preliminary planning by Deutsche Reichsbahn (DR) was adopted for the project in the summer of 1991. A study produced in preparation for the decision of the Central Headquarters of the Reichsbahn (ZHvDR) was presented in November 1991. In early 1992, the planning was completed by DR and then passed to the Leipzig Project Centre of the Planungsgesellschaft Bahnbau Deutsche Einheit mbH ("Planning Corporation for German Unity Rail Construction", PBDE).

In the second half of 1992, the project was named "VDE 8/2". It would connect Erfurt via Halle/Leipzig to Bitterfeld. As part of a 194 km-long project, it would involve the upgrading of 71 km of existing line for a speed of 160 km/h (100 mph) and the rebuilding of 123 km of line for operations at 250 km/h. For the upgraded sections a further upgrade to allow operations at 200 km/h was provided as an option. With the estimated project cost of DM 4.765 billion that was given in the Federal Transport Infrastructure Plan 1992, PBDE estimated in September 1992 that the cost would be DM 5.545 billion. In addition, 85 km of railway power lines, three railway tunnels and five viaducts would be built. The plan was to run until 1997. The upgrading of the old line would be completed in 1996 and the new line would be completed in 2000.

Based on the study of November 1991, the PBDE prepared the preliminary design, which was confirmed by the ZHvDR in late 1992. Simultaneously, a consultation of state and environmental planning organisations took place with the participation of the states and the Federal Agency for Nature Conservation. An investigation was made of the corridor to establish route options at a scale of 1:100,000. Among other things, conflicts and risks for spatial and environmental compatibility as well as effects on railway operations and economic aspects were taken into account. Among other things, the connection of the city of Halle, Leipzig/Halle Airport, the Leipzig Trade Fair and the freight centres in Erfurt and Leipzig were considered. The new line would not only shorten travel times, but also relieve the existing network. The axis between Erfurt and Halle was considered by the Reichsbahn as congested or overloaded.

Based on this, five track alignment options were developed as part of a space sensitivity analysis with further options, including three options for connections with Leipzig. The examined planning area covered an area of about 3700 square kilometers.

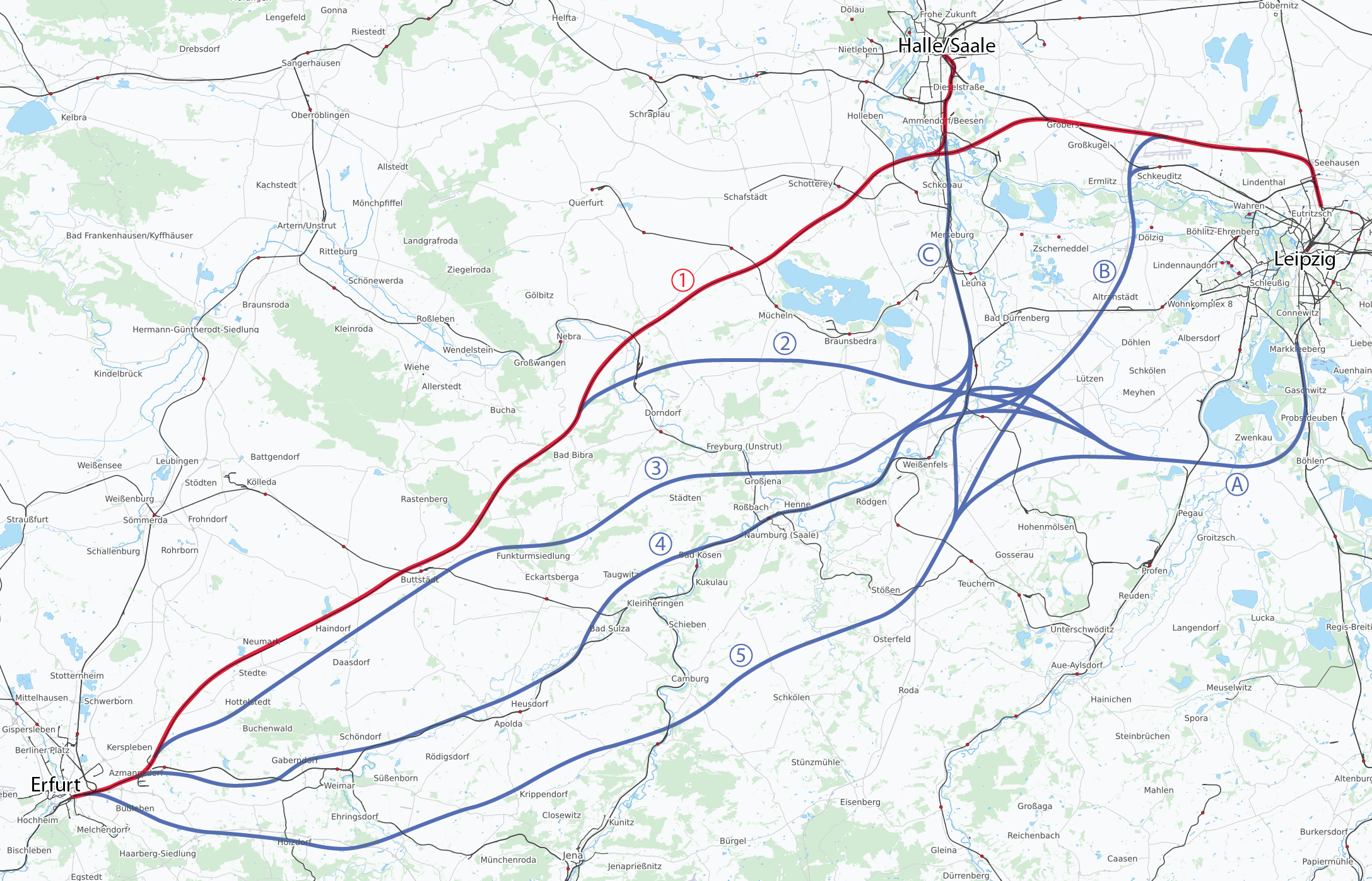
Planning options; the preferred (realised) option is shown in red

The following options were considered:

- Option 1, which was considered the preferred option, provided for a northern route. The existing line would be crossed between Großkorbetha and Halle. This option envisaged linking the line with Neuwiederitzsch, Gröbers and Schkopau/southern Halle with the existing network. The planned cost of the 123 km (76 mi)-long route (between Erfurt and Leipzig) was DM 4.4 billion.
- A second option included a deviation from option 1 to the north of the border of Saxony-Anhalt and Thuringia. The route would have run south of Karsdorf via Roßbach to Großkorbetha. There would be a connecting curve to the line via Merseburg to Halle, while the main line would run to the east via Bad Dürrenberg and Leipzig/Halle Airport to reach the route of option 1 on a more easterly route. 1 The cost of the 128 km (80 mi)-long line was estimated to be DM 5.2 billion.
- Option 3 foresaw a southern course in the Großkorbetha area. A branch would run from there, parallel with the autobahn, to the airport. In addition, there would be an upgrade of the existing line towards Merseburg and Halle. The 123 km (76 mi)-long route was calculated to cost DM 6.6 billion.
- Option 4 involved an investigation of the extent that the new line could run parallel to the existing network. The studies showed that close "bundling" would have been possible only on a quarter of the length of the route. A longer tunnel was provided between Bad Sulza and Bad Kosen. The 125 km (78 mi)-long distance was calculated to cost DM 5.6 billion.
- A fifth option for the line was identified running south of the existing line through the Naumburg area and parallel to Autobahn 9 in the Schkeuditz area. The 130 km long route was calculated to cost DM 5.0 billion.

In the Leipzig area, a southern connection from Leipzig (via the Bayerischen Bahnhof) with a tunnel under the city centre to the Hauptbahnhof was examined.

Options 1 and 2, were examined in depth and their operational, economic and environmental were aspects to be particularly advantageous. Both options followed the same general course in Thuringia and connected with Leipzig from the northwest. The remaining three options were eliminated due to longer travel times and additional costs of about DM 1 billion. Other alternative routes through the state of Thuringia (a combination of routes 1 and 5) were submitted by the city of Halle and Vieregg Rössler (a transport consultancy). In addition to the five main options at least eleven other alternatives were investigated in depth.

From the in-depth investigations, option 1 emerged as the cheapest option. They found it had, inter alia, the shortest travel time, the shortest route length, good environmental compatibility, convenient connections (Leipzig/Halle Airport, Leipzig freight transport centre and Leipzig-Wahren) and comparatively low investment costs. This option was registered for the Federal Transport Infrastructure Plan of 1992 and incorporated into the planning process. After almost eight months of planning, the regional planning procedure (including an environmental impact assessment) was initiated by the transmission by letter of the documents to the participating federal states on 15 September 1992.

Around 1992, the planned costs of option 1 were estimated at DM 4.4 billion. Early in 1993, the cost of the 194 km comprehensive overall project, which at that time also included the Bitterfeld–Leipzig and Bitterfeld–Halle sections, was stated to be D-Mark 5.54 billion. The targeted ICE traveling time between Leipzig and Erfurt was stated to be 39 minutes. Construction was planned to start in 1994, with the commencement of operations in 1999/2000. When construction started in 1994, the commissioning was still foreseen in 2000, at a total cost of DM 4.5 billion as estimated in January 1994. In mid-1994, the planned investment was estimated at DM 4.592 billion (gross). Contracts for building the line would be awarded in eleven lots.

On 3 March 1993, the state government of Thuringia confirmed the routes proposed by the PBDE on the basis of 42 studies. On 15 March, the project was endorsed by the State of Saxony through the Leipzig regional council. On 23 June 1993, it was finally certified by Saxony-Anhalt to comply with land development and environmental plans. The certification was bound by 23 conditions. All three states ultimately confirmed their support for the previously proposed option1. Saxony considered that some long-distance trains would stop at the airport and at Leipzig-Messe station.

The application document for determining the course of the new lines was submitted to the Federal Ministry of Transport in 1994 and the track alignment (including the railway power lines) were confirmed on 23 June 1994; the Federal Environment Ministry endorsed the approval. The selected option, according to Deutsche Bahn, was the shortest route, would have the lowest construction and operating costs and would have the lowest land take. The travel times on the Erfurt-Halle and Erfurt-Leipzig routes would be shortest. The ability to stop at the airport and at the new trade fair and affordable connections to the planned Leipzig/Halle freight transport centre and the Leipzig-Wahren container terminal also favoured the chosen option. The environmental impacts were less than or equivalent to other possible routes. Not least, long-distance trains from the north-west towards Halle/Leipzig and Dresden could use part of the route. As part of the planning work, hundreds of exploratory holes were driven to a depth of up to 70 m.

For the planning approval process, the line was divided into 14 planning approval sections. Taking advantage of the provisions of the Transport Infrastructure Planning Acceleration Act (Verkehrswegeplanungsbeschleunigungsgesetz) approval for construction of all sections was achieved in two and a half years between 1994 and 1996. As part of the planning approval procedure further large and small-scale regional route options were examined. The first planning approval (for section 2.1) was issued in early December 1994. By May 1995, proceedings had been initiated for all sections. On 12 December 1995, the last approval was granted on Thuringian territory. The final decision, for the section between the crossing of the Unstrut and Halle, was adopted at the end of July 1996. All the planning approval process had been completed by early 1997. 18 tonnes of documents were produced for the planning approval process.

On 20 June 2003, Deutsche Bahn CEO Hartmut Mehdorn and Transport Minister Manfred Stolpe signed the financial agreement for the Erfurt–Halle/Gröbers section. The planned cost for the section stood at €1.9 billion, the cost of the whole line was estimated to be €2.67 billion. Completion was scheduled for 2015. In the event of a successful bid by Leipzig for the 2012 Summer Olympics, the line would have been put into operation as early as 2012.

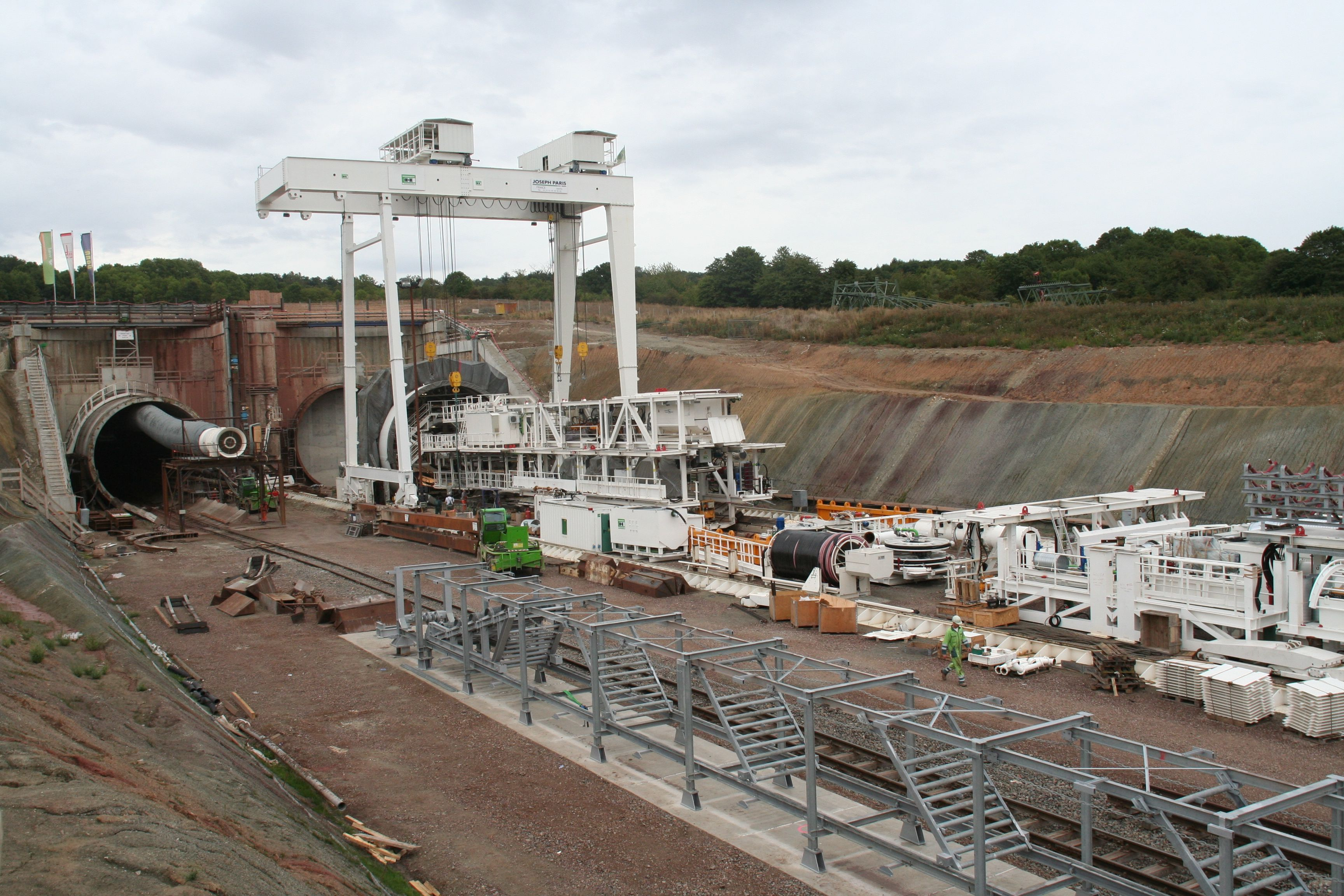
Construction on the Finne tunnel (September 2008)

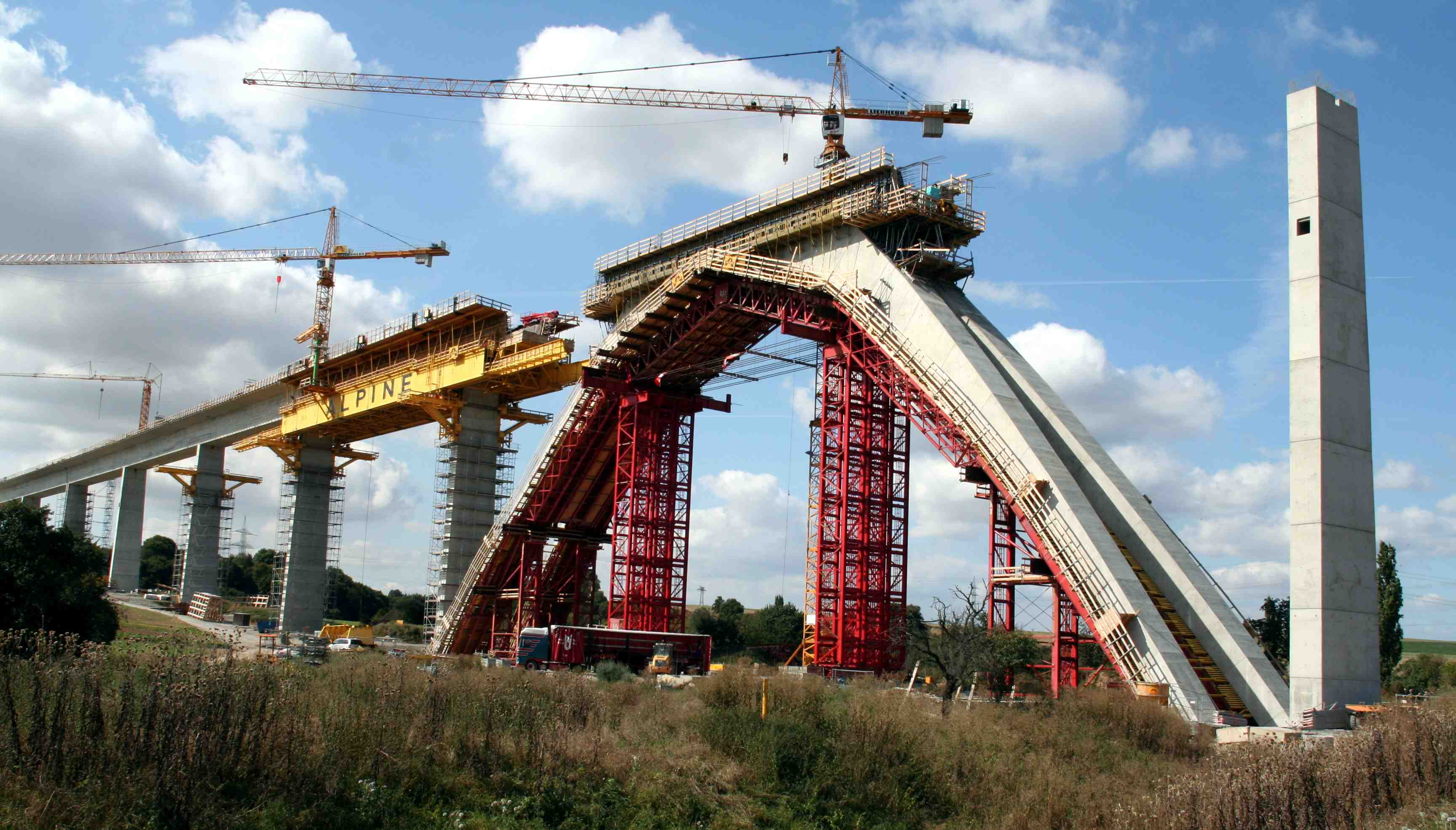
Construction on the Unstrut viaduct (September 2009)

The contract to build the Finne Tunnel was awarded in December 2006. The contract for the Unstrut Viaduct was awarded in January 2007 and that for the Bibra Tunnel was awarded in August 2007. In January 2008, the Osterberg Tunnel contract followed; it was awarded at the end of February 2008. At the beginning of 2009, all major engineering structures were under construction.

In January 2009, Deutsche Bahn called construction tenders for the subgrade of the ballastless section 2 (track-km 197.889 to km 215.937) and the ballastless section 3 (km 215.937 to km 228.685). Both contracts were to run from June 2009 to the end of April 2012. At the end of May 2009, this was followed by the invitation to tender for the contract for the ballastless section 4 (km 251.1 to km 272.1) as well as the ballastless section 5 including the Gröbers junction (km 279.9 bis km 286.9). These contracts were to run from November 2009 to November 2012 (lot 4) and from July 2010 to December 2015 (lot 5). In July 2009, finally, the integration of the line into the Erfurt junction was tendered, which would be built between December 2009 and December 2010. In July 2011, a contract worth €200 million was awarded for the production of slab track and for 22 kilometres (14 mi) of noise and wind barriers between Erfurt and Gröbers. This work would be completed by the end of 2013.

The proposed line speed in the 1990s was stated as partly 250 km/h (160 mph), and partly 300 km/h (186 mph), The design speed was always set at 300 km/h (186 mph). The line speed limit was later raised to 300 km/h (186 mph).

Between Gröbers and Leipzig Messe it is now set at 250 km/h (160 mph); from Leipzig Messe to Leipzig Hbf the permitted speed is 120 to 160 km/h (75 to 100 mph).

A total of around 15,000 land parcels were affected by the construction projects.

The area required for the line is specified as 370 hectares (914 acres), of which 160 hectares (395 acres) are for the track. Environmental and landscape planning compensatory measures are scheduled for an area of about 2,000 hectares (4,942 acres).

=== Construction ===
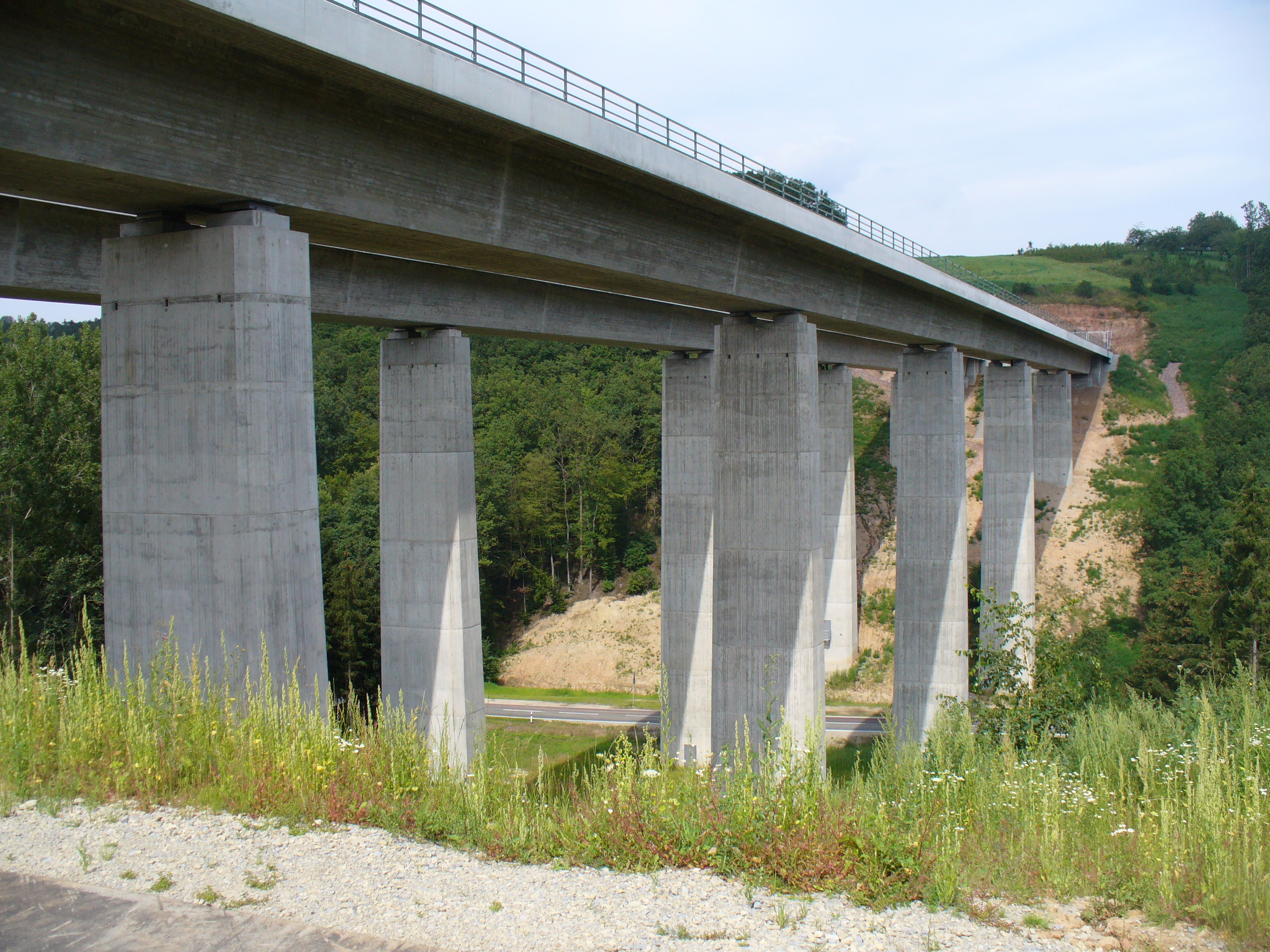
The Saubach Viaduct (2007) was completed in the first major engineering structure of the new line.

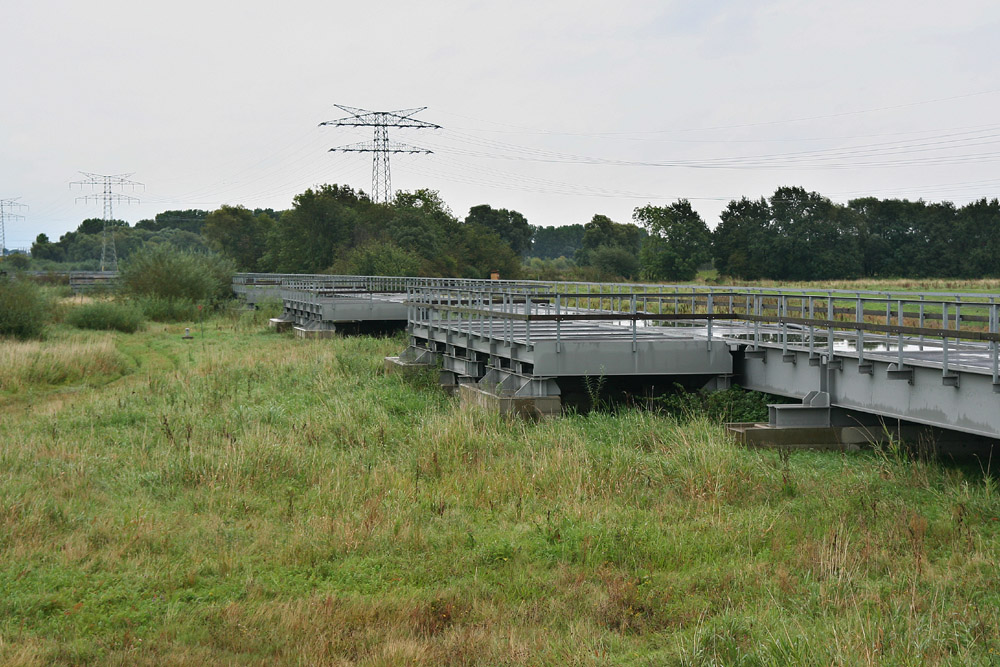
Construction of an elevated track base in an environmentally sensitive area—construction of the Saale-Elster Viaduct (2007)

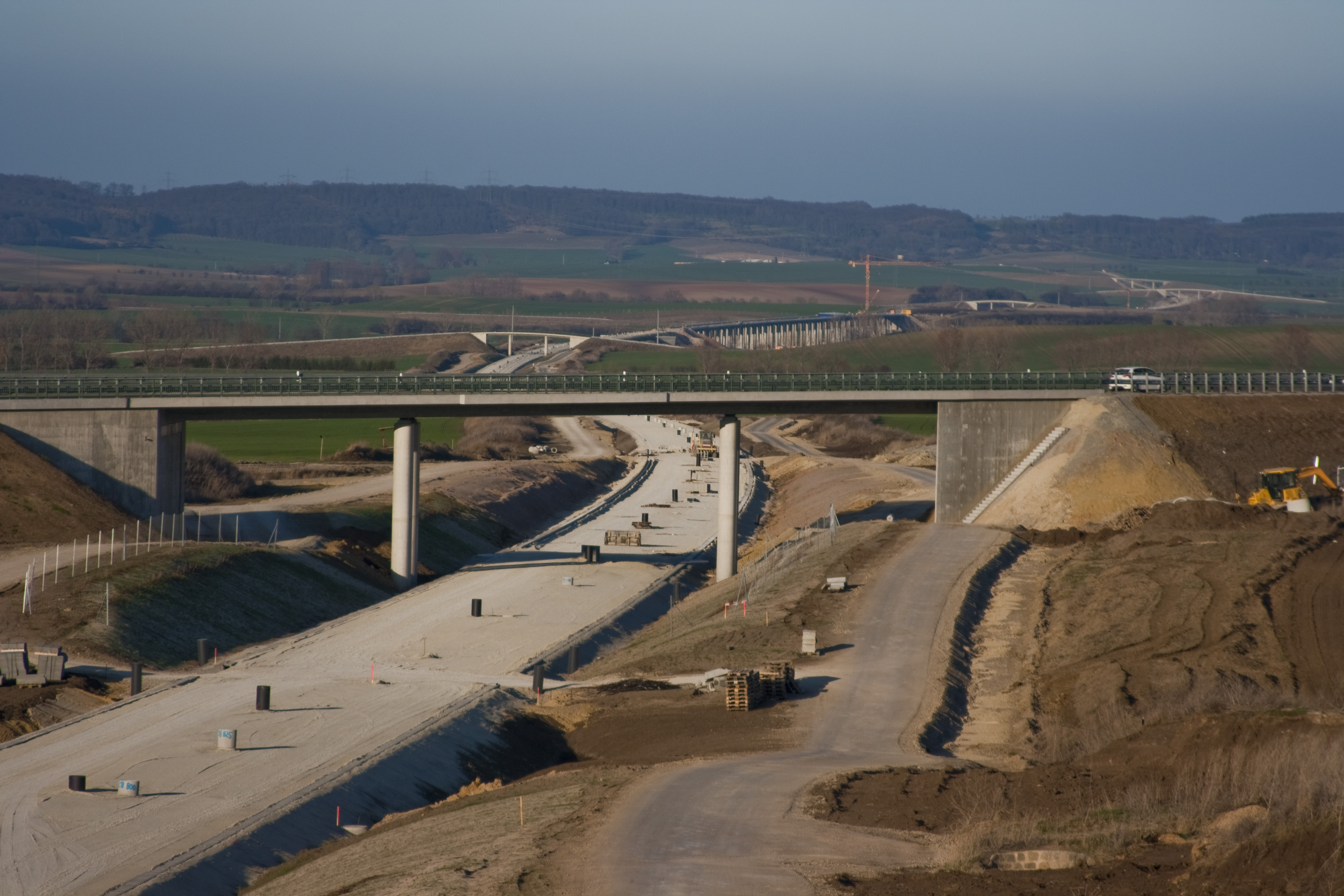
Track base, with the Gänsebach Viaduct in the background (March 2012)

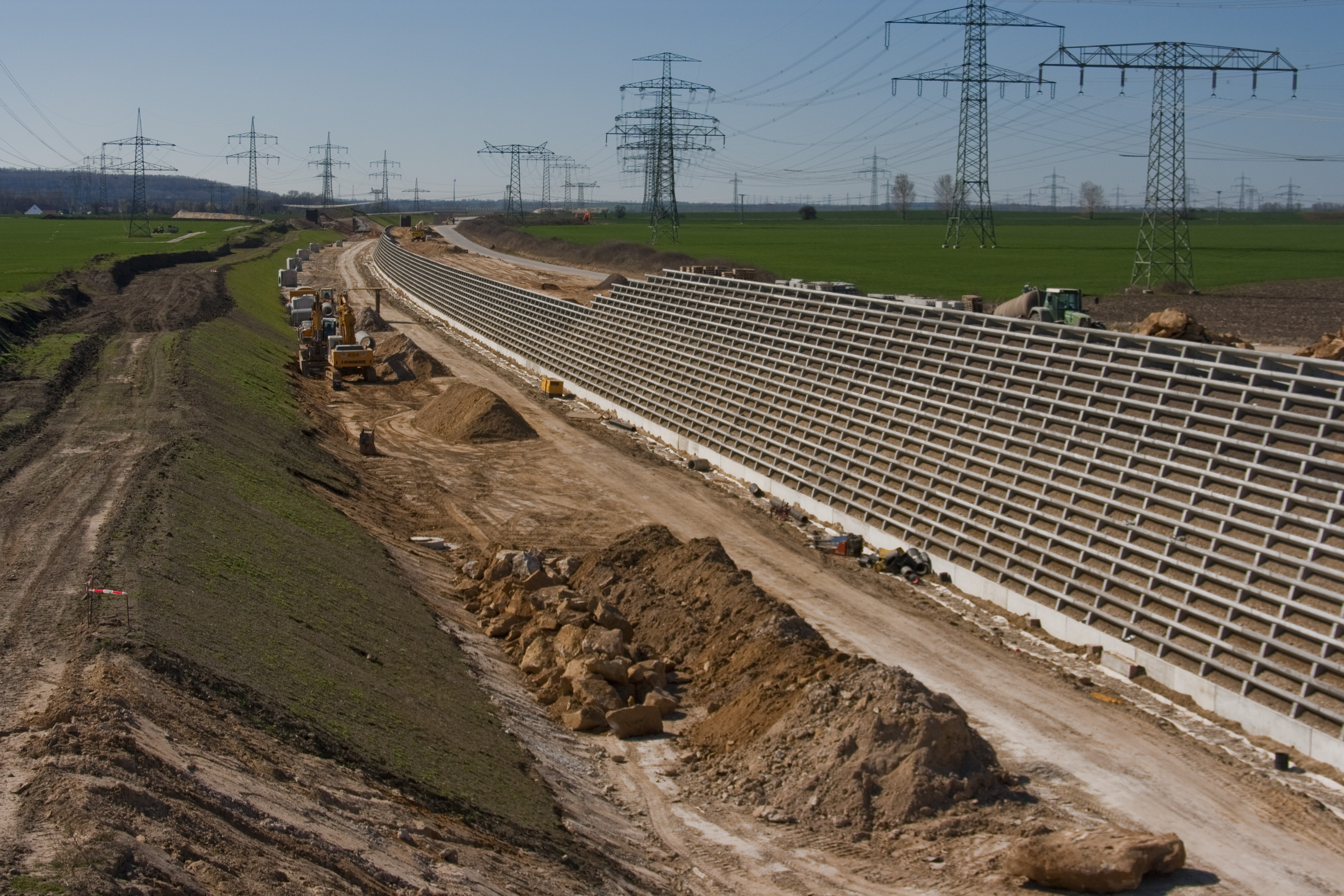
Earthworks on a level section of the line (March 2012)

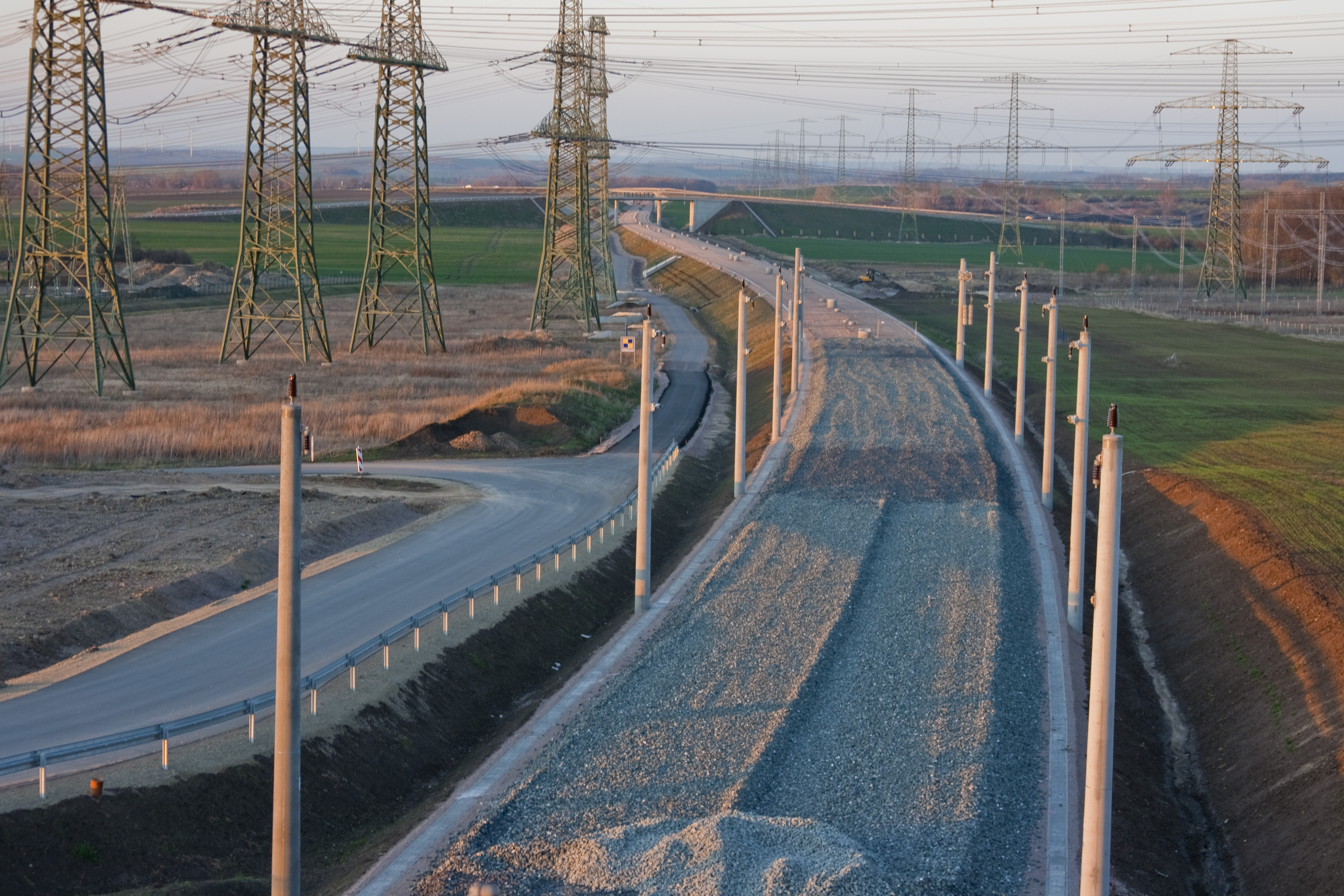
First catenary masts being erected at Erfurt-Vieselbach (March 2012). This shows the separation of the track from the existing grid.

The turning of the sod ceremony was held for the link between Gröbers and Leipzig on 2 October 1996. The Secretary of State Johannes Nitsch, Saxon Economics Minister Kajo Schommer and DB Chairman Ulf Häusler laid the foundations for a 130 m (430 ft) long pedestrian and cycle bridge over the six-lane Autobahn and the planned new line. In mid-1997, the archaeological investigation was carried out between Leipzig and Gröbers.

In mid-1999, the Federal Minister of Transport Franz Müntefering stopped the construction work that had already begun. He justified this by the underfunding of the transport budget. The projects could be taken up at a later time if the traffic demand was rising and sufficient funds were available. New investment finance for new construction projects should be diverted to the development of the existing network. Construction on the new line was limited to the section between Leipzig and Gröbers to improve the market share of the airport link.

A delay in the construction of the Leipzig-Gröbers section was announced in early 2001. Due to geological problems in a former mining area, the commissioning of the section through the Gröbers railway junction was postponed for one year to 2003. €370 million has been invested in this 23 km (14 mi)-long section of the new railway between Leipzig Messe and Flughafen Leipzig/Halle. The track is in this section is currently operated at up to 160 km/h (100 mph). The section was opened on 30 June 2003.

In mid-March 2002, the federal government announced a freeze on work on the whole route and announced its intention to adjust funding for the DB. The then Chancellor Gerhard Schröder announced on 10 March 2002 that construction would resume. The project had not been adequately funded by the previous government and have therefore had to be postponed. Deutsche Bahn welcomed the decision. Yet at the end of February 2002, the former Minister of Transport Bodewig suggested that the realisation of the project was uncertain.

The construction of the Saubach Viaduct began in the first half of 2004.

The first construction phase of the transformation of the southern approach to Halle to introduce the new line ran into the town started in October 2005. New external platforms were built south of the existing site at Ammendorf/Beesen station. A new electronic interlocking took over the functions of four new signal boxes and a total of 6300 m of noise barriers were built. After the completion of this work, the speed is in this section was raised from 120 to 160 km/h (75 to 100 mph). A total of €92.5 million was invested in these works, including €64.4 million from the European Regional Development Fund. The upgrade of the 5.6 km (3.5 mi) long section was completed at the end of May 2008. In a second stage of construction, the connection of the new line, including a crossing structure, was built from 2010 to 2011.

The construction of the Saale-Elster Viaduct started in 2006; some access roads had previously been built on platforms on stilts in a nature reserve. By February 2006 preconstruction work was under way in the Unstrut Viaduct area. In December 2006, the Saubach Viaduct was completed as the first major engineering structure on this section.

The Federal Government and Deutsche Bahn AG announced in December 2006 that the project would be completed in 2015. In December 2006, a parliamentary group of supporters was founded to promote the "completion of the German Unity Transport Project No. 8" with more than 20 members in the Bundestag. The parliamentarians wanted to work for an accelerated completion of the line.

From the summer of 2007, a series of road overbridges were under construction between Erfurt and Buttstädt. In September 2007, the site equipment began to be installed for the west portal of the Finne Tunnel. On 30. April 2008, construction started on the Finne Tunnel, the longest tunnel on the route.

Between September 2008 and 2010, archaeological excavations along the future route found evidence of more than 7500 years of human history. More than 100,000 finds were found in an area of more than 100 hectares. A total of 150 staff were employed in eight excavation team. It was one of the largest archaeological excavations in Germany. About €11 million was spent on the work.

The Finne Tunnel was structurally complete in the spring of 2012. The earthworks of the 30 km (19 mi) long section in the Thuringian basin was completed in June 2012. The construction site was connected via a construction track to the Erfurt node, so that the installation of the slab track, the catenary, the electrical engineering and the train control and protection systems could be started in this section. The Saale-Elster Viaduct and Osterberg Tunnel were completed by 2012.

The completion of earthworks between Erfurt and Gröbers was celebrated in early December 2012. In this 100-kilometre (62 mi) section 5.5 million cubic metres of earth and building materials were moved and 35 bridges were built. After just over a year of construction in November 2013, the rails were largely in place and 3000 catenary masts had been installed. The new railway power line could be put into operation. Subsequently, the catenary system was installed and became live on 25 August 2014. The development of control and safety technology with electronic interlocking technology and the installation of radio equipment proceeded in parallel.

The major project was originally controlled by the Planungsgesellschaft Bahnbau Deutsche Einheit ("Planning Corporation for German Unity Rail Construction"). From 2000, DB Projekt Verkehrsbau was entrusted with this task and since 2003m its successor, DB ProjektBau, has been responsible.

=== Commissioning ===
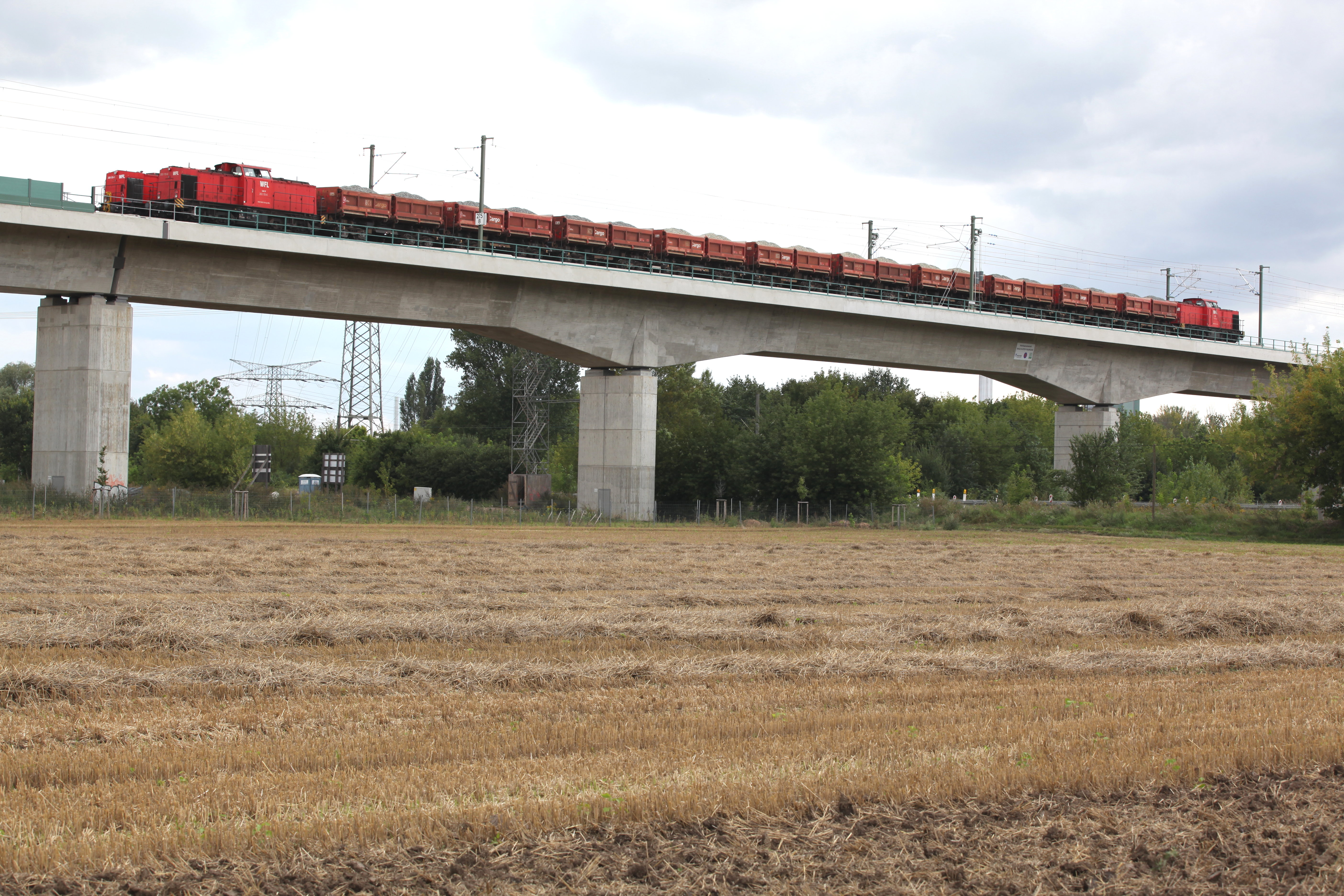
Load test of the Saale-Elster Viaduct with two heavy freight trains (August 2014)

ICE S at 300 km/h on the Stöbnitz Viaduct during high-speed tests (September 2014)

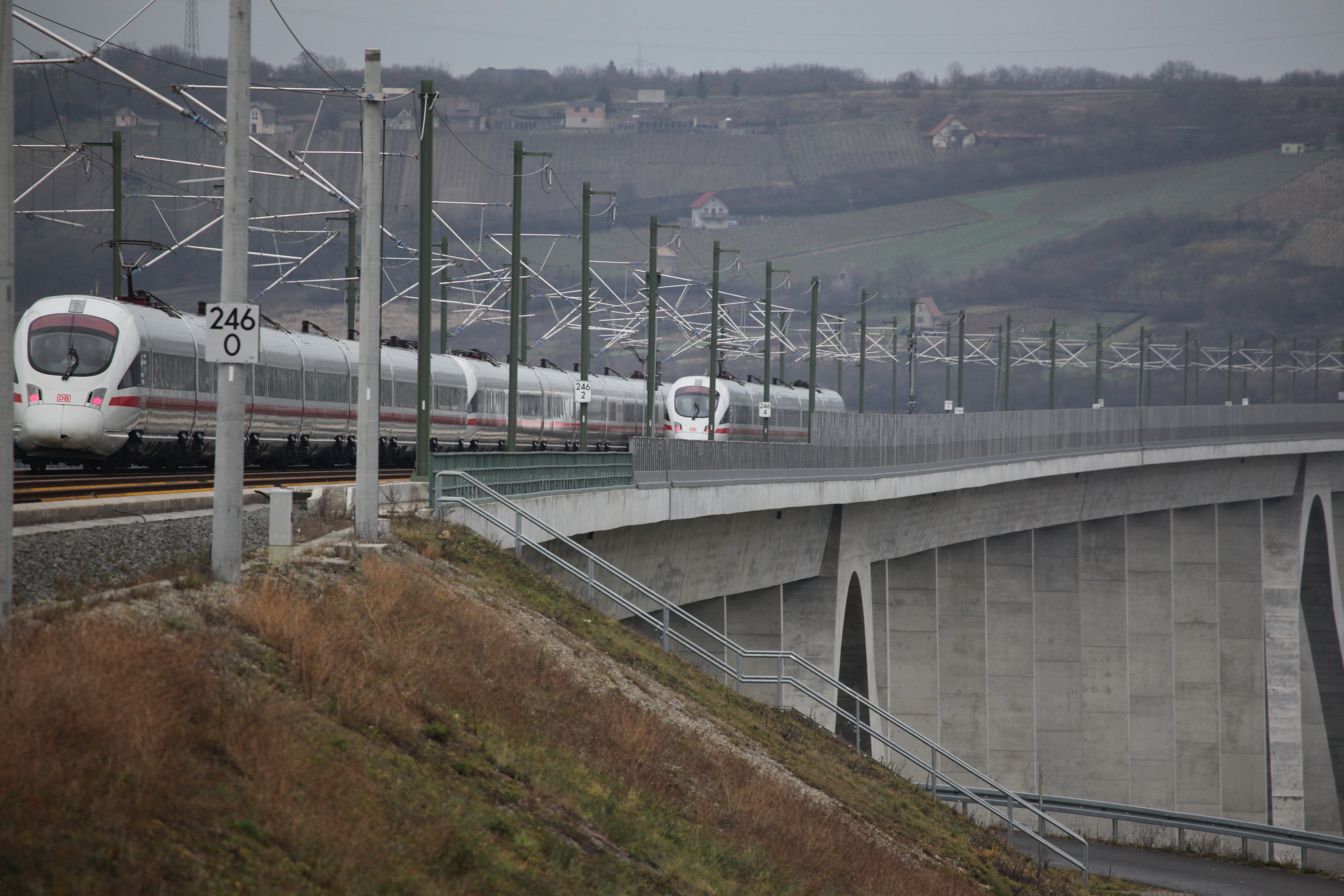
Parallel ride on Unstrut Viaduct at the opening ceremony on 9 December 2015

==== Gröbers–Leipzig-Mockau section ====
The section between Leipzig/Halle Airport station and Leipzig-Mockau was provisionally put into operation at the timetable change on 15 December 2002. The Leipzig/Halle Airport station was only partly finished. The trains ran hourly with class 642 diesel railcars. Previously, the main tracks in Leipzig Messe station were reconfigured so that the Magdeburg–Leipzig railway and the Trebnitz–Leipzig railway, which previously had separate tracks between Leipzig Hauptbahnhof and Leipzig Messe now share the left-hand pair of tracks and the new, right-hand pair of tracks were connected to the new line towards the airport. The infrastructure track numbers in this section were changed.

Work on Gröbers junction was still under way in early 2003. The line was connected to Gröbers junction on 16 April 2003 and the overhead wires on the whole section became live on 24 April 2003. Operations commenced on the section between Gröbers and Leipzig/Halle Airport station on 30 June 2003. From this time, all long-distance trains between Leipzig and Halle ran over the newly built section and Regional-Express services on route RE 5 ran hourly. The introduction of additional services between Leipzig Hauptbahnhof and the airport was repeatedly deferred to cut costs.

A total of more than 70 long-distance and regional trains ran daily on the line in 2003. On 13 October 2003, trial runs of ICE S sets began with speeds of up to 330 km/h (210 mph). These runs were operated on behalf of the manufacturer to gain approval for the train sets to run under the overhead line at high speeds. With the opening of the City Tunnel, trains which previously ran as RE 5, were now rebranded as lines S5 and S5X of the Mitteldeutschland S-Bahn bound for Zwickau.

==== Erfurt – Gröbers und Planena – Halle-Ammendorf section ====
On 25 August 2014, the overhead contact line on the remaining new line was permanently energised. From 1 to 19 September 2014, high-sped trials were carried out with ICE S sets. As part of these runs, a train reached a speed of 330 km/h (210 mph) on the section from Erfurt to Gröbers for the first time on 5 September 2014. Testing and acceptance of ETCS began in late 2014, which was followed to test runs in early 2015. From May to October 2015, the three-tier safety regime of the ETCS systems was tested. Between March and October 2015, this was followed by around 900 test runs to measure the track geometry to check the overhead contact wire system with the later trains running on the route using ETCS technology. A trial was operated between Erfurt, Leipzig and Halle (Saale) on 4 September 2015.

As part of the opening ceremony on 9 December 2015, two special trains ran on the line with guests of honour—among others, Chancellor Angela Merkel and DB chief Rüdiger Grube—part of this involved running the two trains side by side in same direction. Initially the trains were formed of specially converted ICE T set 1129 (named "Leipzig") and set 1173 (named "Halle (Saale)") from Halle to Erfurt. This was followed by a run to Leipzig, during which ICE set 1504 ("Erfurt") ran partly in parallel.

The line was put into operation for public passenger and freight transport at the timetable change on 13 December 2015. The first scheduled train was ICE set 1654 running from Leipzig to Wiesbaden.

The introduction of the new ICE line 15, the rerouting of ICE line 28 and a number of timetable adjustments between Halle, Berlin and Hamburg were necessary.

==== Certification problems ====
A new form of slab track, which can be used on long bridges, has been installed on the line. According to DB information, it is the only such system on the market. The Federal Railway Authority (Eisenbahn-Bundesamt, EBA) declined an application for the approval of the use of the slab track in May 2015. The construction was considered weak because of a compensating layer of unreinforced concrete, although this was an accepted engineering technique and was imported from building regulations. The reinforcement was mandatory in the view of the EBA for handling stresses. Evidence needed to be provided that dynamic loads did not create excessive tensile forces on the blinding concrete. The Authority was concerned that the concrete would thus show no cracks when rehabilitation was needed. Six bridges along the entire line are affected by this problem.

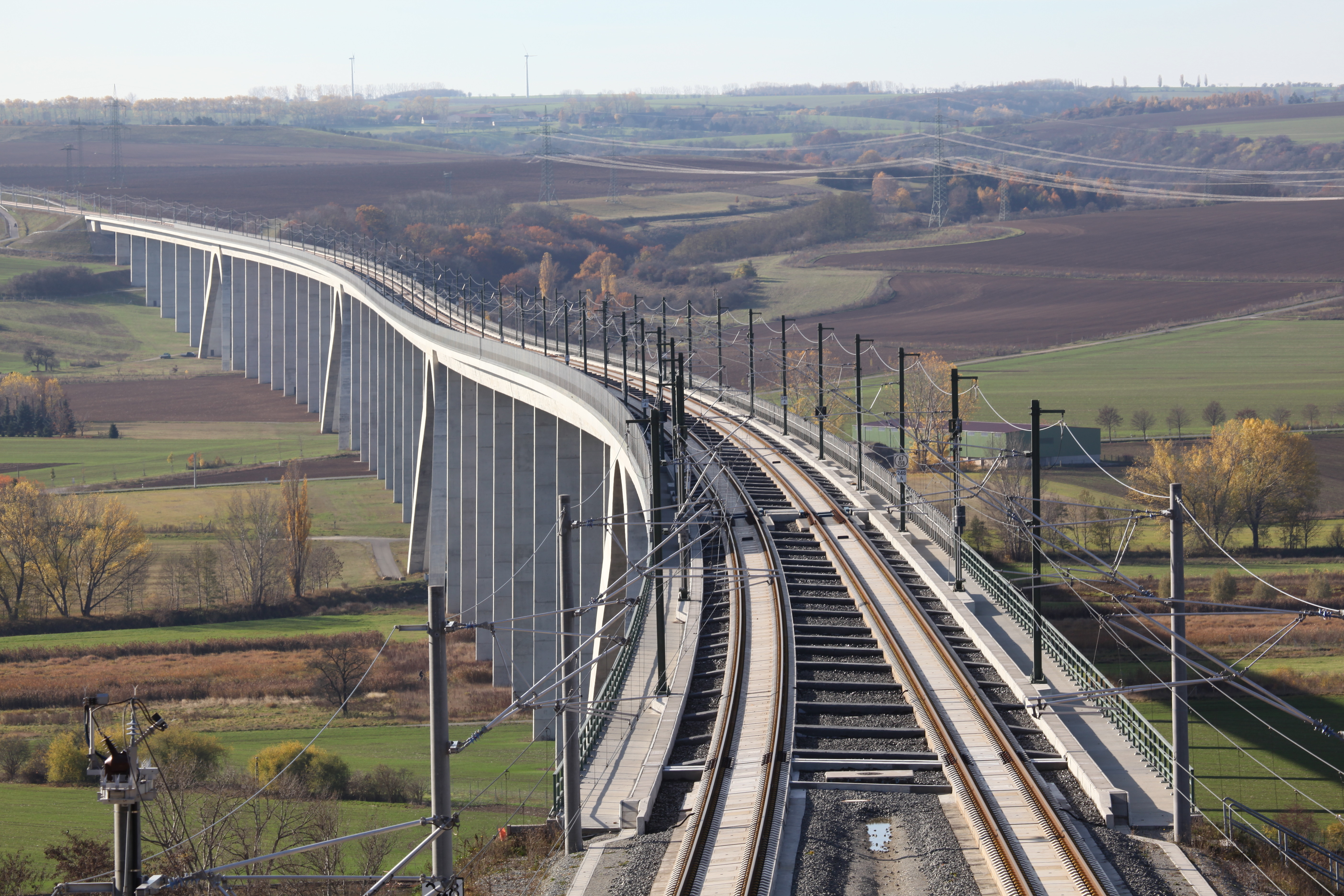
Slab track with additional lateral guide (Unstrutt Viaduct, October 2015)

On 25 June 2015, the EBA and DB agreed on a package of measures at a meeting at the Federal Ministry of Transport. An examination would be carried out under Common Safety Methods (CSM) to determine whether a side concrete layer on both sides of the structure would create additional lateral strength by the end of July 2015. Thus, the lateral resistance would be increased. On bridges, with a length of over ten metres, 1500 one metre-long plates were attached. In combination with supplementary load tests, an ongoing special monitoring of proof of equivalent safety should be conducted as the basis for project-specific approval. The relevant opinion was given on 31 August 2015 with positive results. Now bimonthly test runs are carried out to check the track situation, the related tolerances are lower than on other routes.

The ad hoc structural additions were completed in early November 2015. The Federal Railway Authority finally granted the operating license for the route on 8 December 2015.

Further problems occurred with the approval of the ETCS system. So in the course of test and acceptance runs, software errors and the need to adjust the track configuration data have been observed. After the elimination of the errors, authorisation to use the ETCS system could be given on 10 September 2015.

=== Operations ===
After 100 days of operation, Deutsche Bahn pointed to positive results. The number of passengers has increased by 35 percent in the first two months of operation, with a total of 750,000 of passengers counted on the new line. According to surveys, many commuters had switched from private transport to rail. 5380 scheduled operations ran under ETCS up to 17 March 2016. 95 percent of these ran without problems with ETCS. ETCS disturbances had occurred, among other things due to the incorrect actions of employees, problems with the digital train radio, problems with rolling stock and a systemic failure of the ETCS infrastructure. The software bug in the ETCS was resolved by a software update in May 2016.

=== Costs and funding ===
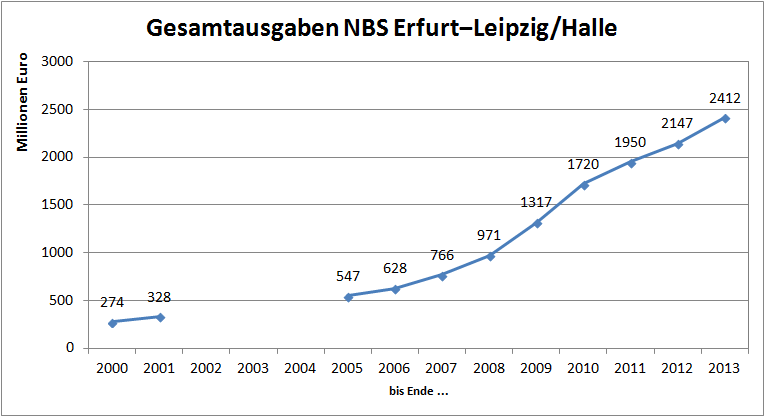
Cumulative total expenditure on the Erfurt‒Leipzig/Halle high-speed line

The estimated cost of the route was estimated in mid-2014 as €2.967 billion. At the end of 2013, €2.412 billion had been spent. €555 million was outstanding.

In 1993, estimated costs was given as DM 4.4 billion. At that time, construction was planned to begin in 1994 and was to be completed in 2000. In 2003, the cost of the route was specified as €2.31 billion, in 2007 as €2.666 billion By 2013, this amount had changed only slightly to €2.74 billion, The cost was specified as €2.967 billion in mid-2014. 2010 was the year with the highest expenses for the construction of the track, €403 million (see next chart).

As part of an application for EU funding, the project was rated as having a cost-benefit ratio of 2.2.

As part of the Trans-European Networks, part of the project has been cofinanced from the European Regional Development Fund (ERDF). Thus €57 million of ERDF assistance was provided during the 2000–2006 period for the construction of southern link to Halle. In the period 2007–2013, a further €49.8 million was approved for the project. As part of the stimulus package, it was also provided with €78 million of federal funding for the new line from 2009.

== Operational concept ==
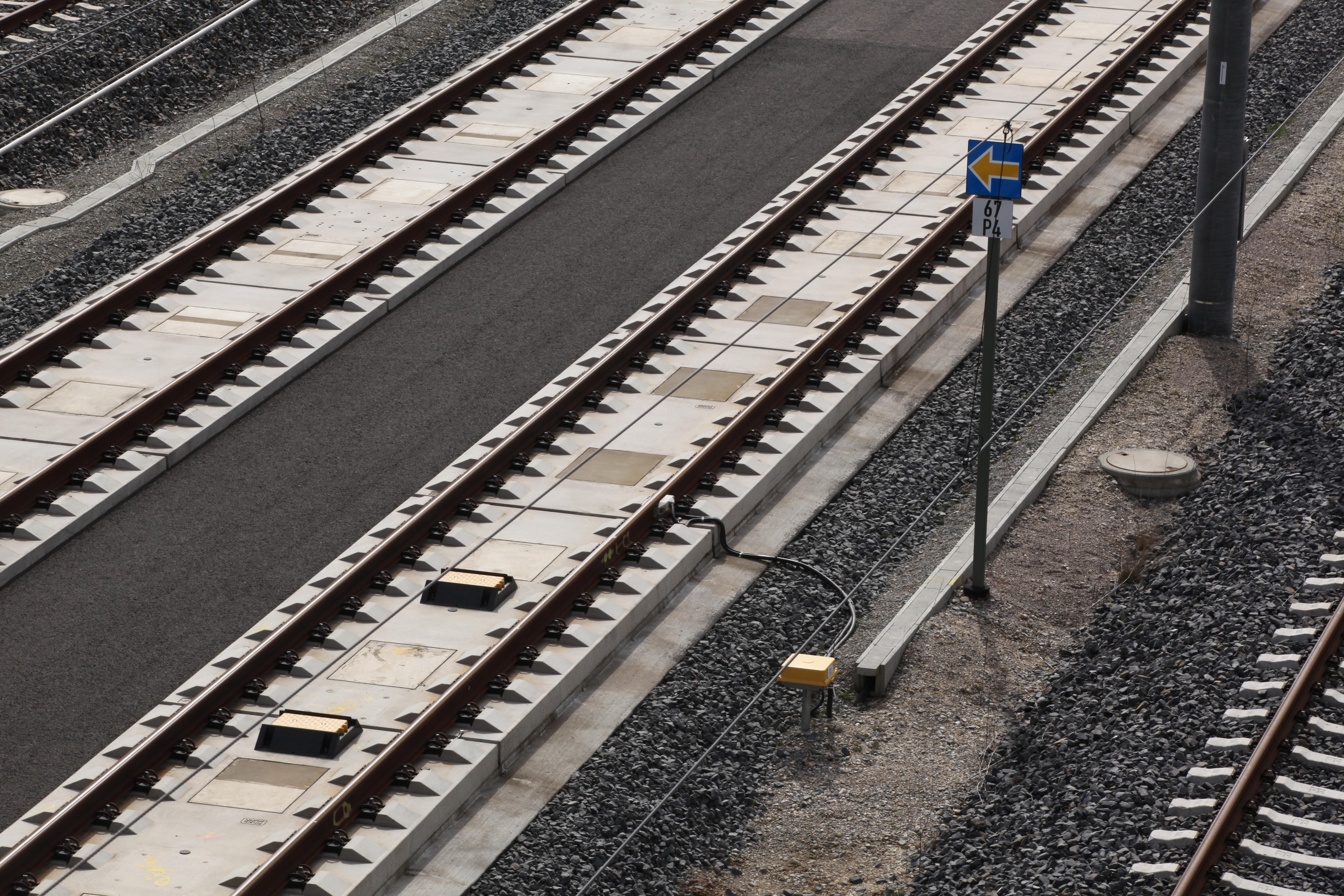
Two Eurobalises at an ETCS stop marker at the Jüdendorf overtaking loop

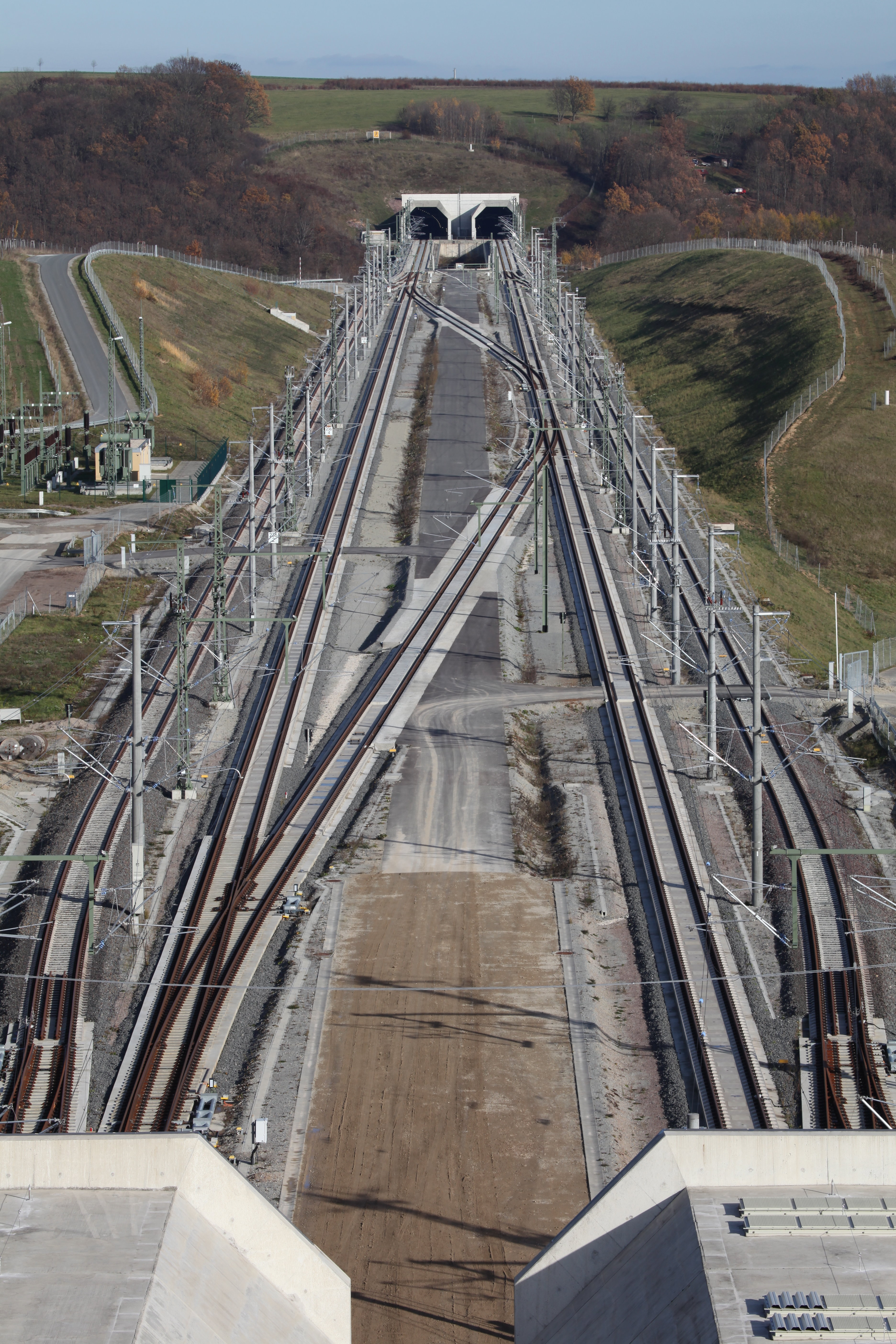
Saubachtal overtaking loop and substation

The new line can be operated with all freight and passenger trains in mixed traffic. As the line is signalled exclusively with ETCS Level 2 without signals, it can only be used by vehicles equipped with ETCS.

=== Original plans ===
According to planning in January 1993, ICE services in 2005 would consist of two and a half trains per hour and direction. This provided for three ICE lines (Frankfurt–Leipzig–Dresden, Munich–Leipzig–Berlin and Frankfurt–Halle–Berlin). Interchange between these lines would thus be possible in Erfurt Hauptbahnhof. Moreover, there would be InterCity and InterRegio trains on the line. Between Frankfurt and Dresden, a journey time of three and a half hours would be possible in 1995.

In early 1993, it was expected that about 150 passenger and about 100 freight trains would run each day. The traffic forecast for Federal Transport Infrastructure Plan 1992 foresaw that there would be 56 distance passenger and 95 freight trains per day in each direction on the new line in 2010. In mid-1994, Deutsche Bahn expected that 48 long-distance passenger and 60 freight trains would use the line per day. The separation of fast and slow traffic (under a program called Netz 21) had not yet been adopted. In the mid-1990s, 24 IC/ICE trains per day were expected to use the new line in each direction between Berlin, Leipzig and Erfurt in 2000 (16 of which continuing from/to Nuremberg) and 16 IC/ICE trains per day and direction on the Frankfurt–Erfurt–Leipzig–Dresden route. On the existing route, three InterRegio lines would be offered with a total of 21 trains per day in each direction. Traffic forecasts made in 1994, for 2000, projected 40 or 43 freight trains from the Leipzig/Halle direction. Other traffic forecasts from around 1995, expected 289 trains per day between Erfurt and Planena junction (the sum of passenger and freight trains in both directions). Of these 141 would run to and from Halle and 148 would run to and from Leipzig. Traffic on the existing network would remain about the same.

=== Commissioning of 2016 timetable ===
The line was taken into commercial operation at the timetable change on 13 December 2015. Scheduled operation initially used ICE T sets, with a top speed of 230 km/h. These trains were equipped with ETCS for this purpose, with the modification of more ICE classes to follow. ICE 1 sets, which will operate on the Ebensfeld–Erfurt–Leipzig/Halle high-speed line would also receive ECTS.

Since the commissioning of the line, Weimar and Naumburg are no longer served by ICE services in east–west traffic.

==== Travel times ====
After commissioning, the travel times for the now 121 kilometres between Erfurt and Leipzig was reduced from around 70 to 43 minutes ICE services and between Erfurt and Halle (now 92 kilometres) from around 75 to 34 minutes. The scheduled travel times of 39 minutes (Erfurt–Leipzig) or 31 minutes (Erfurt–Halle) could not be achieved due to extensive construction work in the nodes of Leipzig and Halle.

Since the opening, the travel time between Erfurt and Berlin has been about an hour and 45 minutes, about 45 minutes less than in 2013. Between Erfurt and Dresden, the journey time is about one hour and 50 minutes, 40 minutes faster than in 2013 or about 15 minutes faster than in 2000 after the introduction of the ICE T. (The ICE T could run faster than conventional trains using tilting over a number of existing sections of line until 2008. This has not been possible since 2008, due to technical problems).

Until the 2017 opening of the Nuremberg–Erfurt high-speed railway, Berlin-Munich services did not use the line, because although the Arnstadt-Saalfeld line allows a connection from Erfurt, it is not electrified.

Route	New route	2016 travel time	Travel speed	Old route	2015 travel time	Travel time savings	Shortest travel time^{1}	Travel time savings
Leipzig – Erfurt section
Leipzig – Erfurt	121 km	0:44 h	165 km/h	117 km	1:12 h	28 min	1:01 h^{2006}	17 min
Dresden – Leipzig – Erfurt – Frankfurt (Main)	507 km	4:18 h	118 km/h	504 km	5:17 h ^{3}	59 min	4:24 h^{2001}	6 min
Halle (Saale) – Erfurt section
Halle (Saale) – Erfurt	92 km	0:34 h	163 km/h	109 km	1:17 h	43 min	1:03 h^{2005}	31 min
Berlin – Halle (Saale) – Erfurt – Frankfurt (Main)	522 km	3:53 h	135 km/h	539 km	4:57 h ^{2},^{3}	64 min	4:44 h^{2007},^{2}	51 min

^{1} = Superscript number refers to the corresponding timetable year
^{2} = Only individual services
^{3} = Trains to and from Frankfurt South station

==== ICE services ====
The following lines use the new line under the 2016 timetable:

Line	Route	Line section	Frequency	Remarks
ICE 15	(Frankfurt am Main –) Erfurt – Halle (Saale) – Berlin	Erfurt–Halle	6 daily	ICE Sprinter
ICE 50	(Wiesbaden –) Frankfurt am Main – Erfurt – Leipzig (– Dresden)	Erfurt–Leipzig	60 min	

=== Upgrade under VDE 8.1 for the 2018 timetable ===
The integration of the new line into Leipzig Hauptbahnhof, where the busy lines over a length of around 3 km can currently be operated at only with 40 km/h, is due to be completed by the end of 2017 and speeds will then be raised to 160 km/h. In addition, an electronic interlocking in Leipzig-Mockau would also open in 2017. With the start of the Nuremberg-Erfurt high-speed railway in December 2017, the following services are expected to run on the new line:

Line	Route	Line section	Frequency	Remarks
ICE 29	Munich – Nuremberg – Erfurt – Halle (Saale) – Berlin	Erfurt–Halle	Five train couples	ICE-Sprinter
ICE 11	Munich – Stuttgart – Frankfurt am Main – Erfurt – Leipzig – Berlin	Erfurt–Leipzig	Every 2 hours on hour 1^{1}	
ICE 15	Frankfurt am Main – Erfurt – Halle (Saale) – Berlin	Erfurt–Halle	Every 2 hours	ICE-Sprinter
ICE 18	Munich – Nuremberg – Erfurt – Halle (Saale) – Berlin – Hamburg	Erfurt–Halle	Every 2 hours on hour 1^{1}	
ICE 28	Munich – Nuremberg – Erfurt – Leipzig – Berlin – Hamburg	Erfurt–Leipzig	Every 2 hours on hour 2^{1}	
ICE 50	Frankfurt am Main – Erfurt – Leipzig – Dresden	Erfurt–Leipzig	Every 2 hours on hour 2^{1}	

^{1} = Hour 1 and 2 means that in hour 1, line 11 continues via Berlin to Hamburg and line 28.1 stops in Berlin. In the other hour, line 28.2 continues beyond Berlin and line 50 runs from Leipzig towards Dresden.

With the commissioning of the new line (including the route to Ebenfeld), the long-distance route between Berlin and Munich via Halle will be around 32 km shorter and 20 minutes faster than via Leipzig. On the other hand, according to Deutsche Bahn, the route via Leipzig has a much larger potential passenger traffic market than Halle.

ICE line 15 will be partly operated with ICE 3 trains from the end of 2017 and thus produce a further reduction of travelling time of approximately ten minutes.

Deutsche Bahn expected in early 2016 that the first special trains would run in the same year. The total start-up VDE 8 is expected in December 2017.

== Notes ==
=== Sources ===
- Bärbel Jossunek; Vasco P. Kolmorgen; Alexander Wolf (2015-08-13). Bahnkonzept (ed.). "Streckenprospekt NBS Erfurt – Leipzig / Halle" (in German). DB Netz; Infrastruktur & Technik; Kundeninformationen. p. 175. Archived from the original (PDF) on 16 August 2015.
