= Saale-Elster Viaduct =

Railway bridge in Central Germany

Coordinates: 51°24′40″N 11°58′57″E

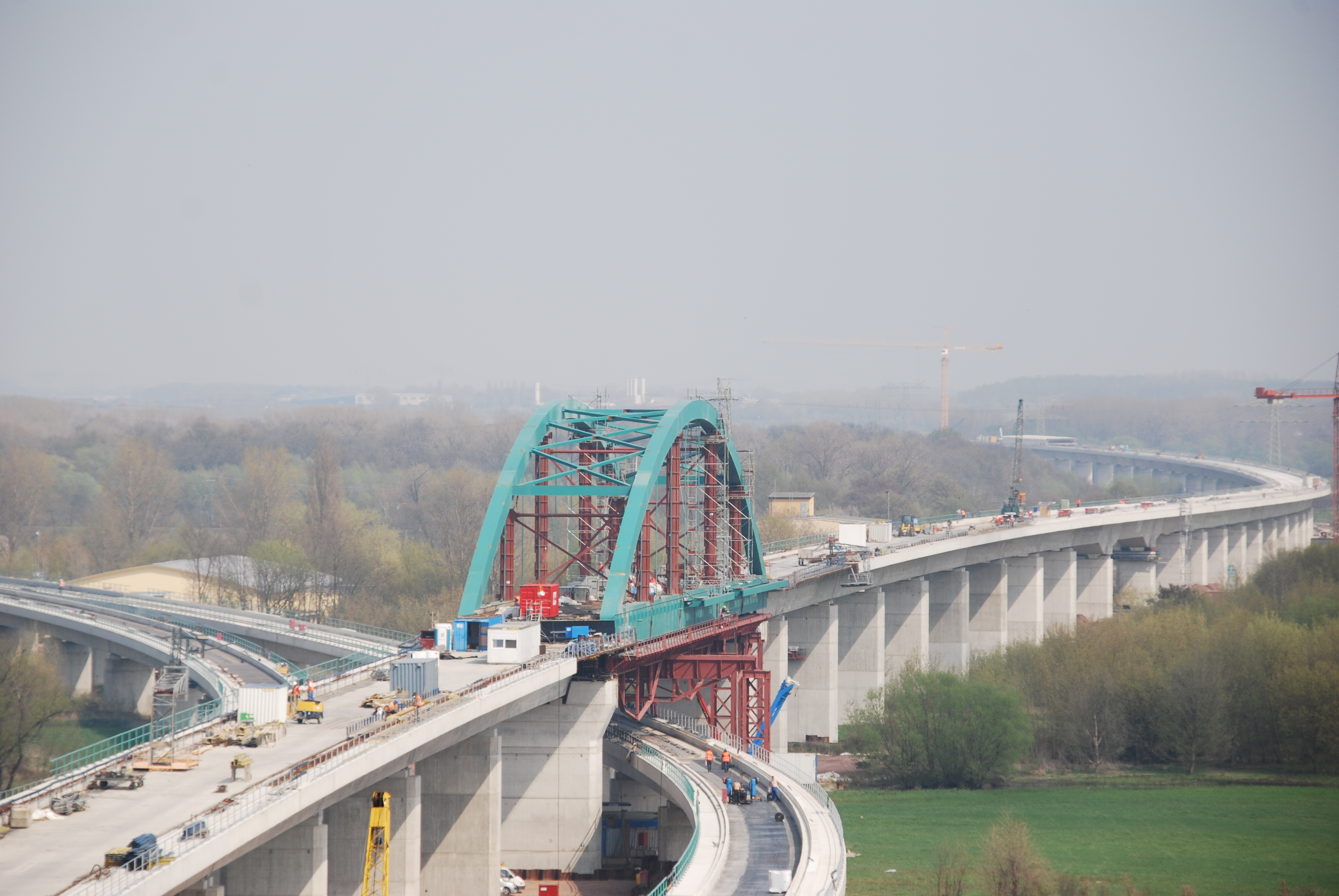
Bridge under construction (April 2013)

The Saale-Elster Viaduct is a railway bridge along the Erfurt–Leipzig/Halle high-speed railway in Central Germany. It was completed in 2013 and opened in 2015. The viaduct is 6,465 metres (21,211 ft) long and thereby the longest bridge in Germany and the longest high-speed rail bridge in Europe. It includes a branch of 2,112 metres (6,929 ft) length.

The prestressed concrete box girder bridge carries a Deutsche Bahn Intercity-Express (ICE) line over the extended floodplain at the confluence of the Saale and White Elster rivers, a natural habitat of wild fauna and flora south of Halle, Saxony-Anhalt. The branch provides a connection to the parallel Halle–Bebra railway line.
