= Ballastless track =

Railway without a crushed stone bed

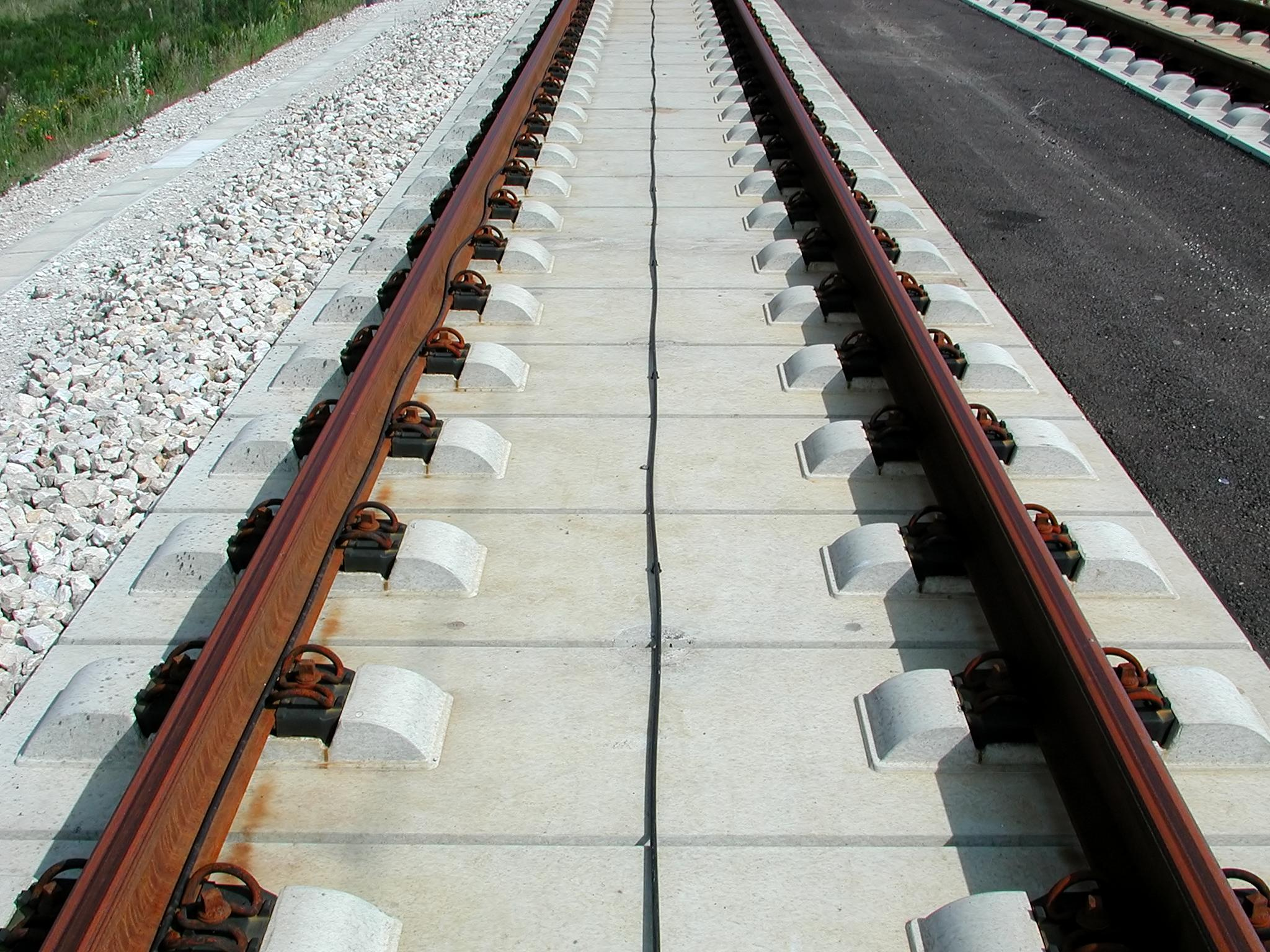
Slab track with flexible noise-reducing rail fixings, built by German company Max Bögl, on the Nürnberg–Ingolstadt high-speed line

A ballastless track or slab track is a type of railway track infrastructure in which the traditional elastic combination of sleepers and ballast is replaced by a rigid construction of concrete or asphalt. It is considered the standard for high-speed and heavy-haul railway lines. It is also commonly used for urban tramways.

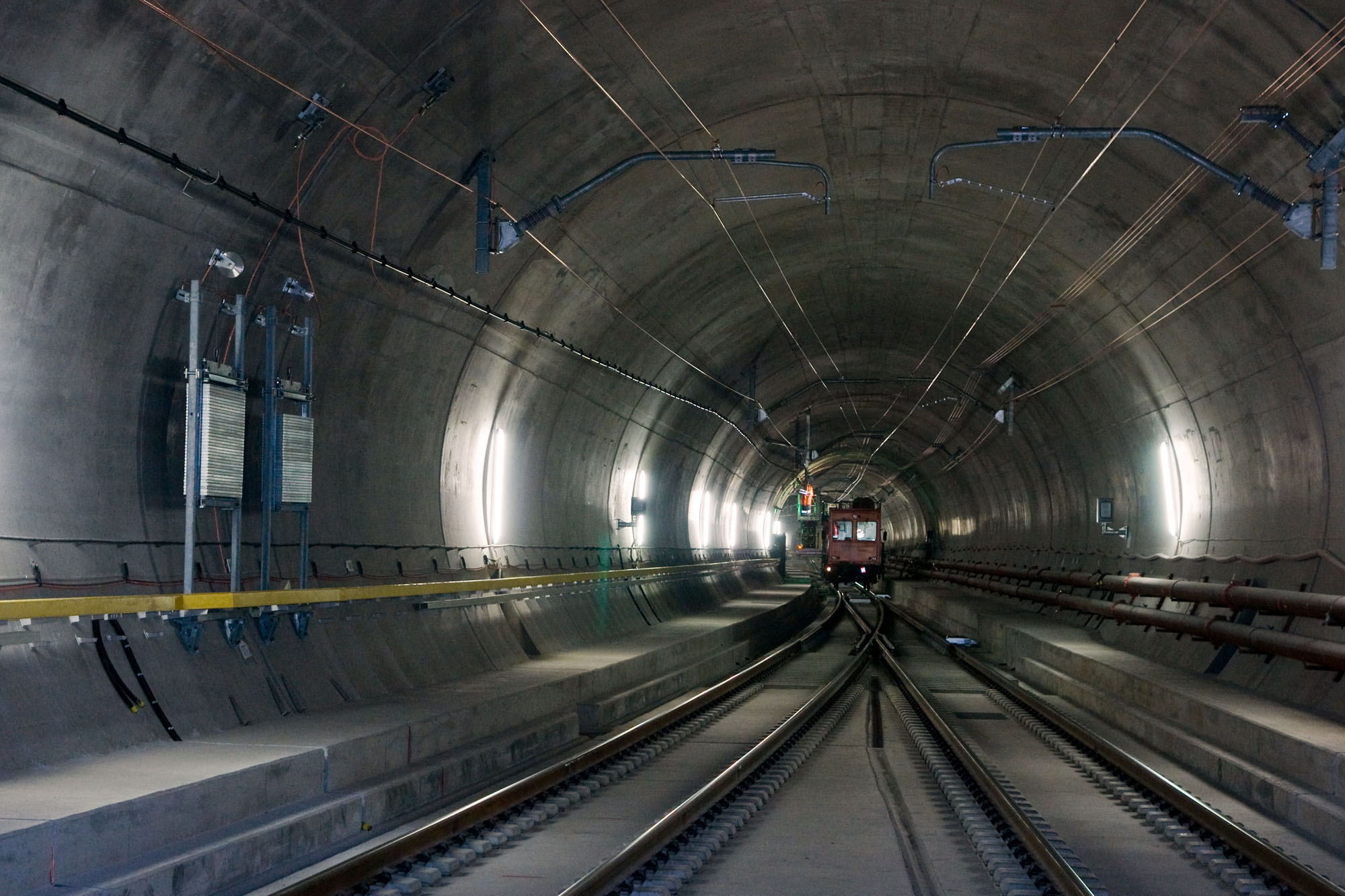
Ballastless track of the type "Low Vibration Track" in a turnout in the Gotthard Base Tunnel's Faido multifunction station

== Characteristics ==
In ballastless tracks, the rails are either discretely supported or continuously supported. Discretely supported rails sit on elastomeric pads and are rigidly fastened to special types of concrete sleepers. These sleepers are themselves set directly in concrete or in rubber 'boots' and both are then set in concrete. Continuously supported rails are generally fixed in slots in the concrete slab and called Embedded Rail Track. The rails, which can be either traditional Vignole Rails with a head, web and foot, or block rails with no web, are either cast into the slots by an elastic compound or surrounded by a close-fitting boot before being fixed in place with grout. Both the surface mounted rail and the embedded block rail can be simply removed and replaced.

Ballastless tracks offer a high consistency in track geometry which is difficult to adjust after the concreting of the superstructure; they must therefore be concreted with a tolerance better than ± 1.0 mm.

The elasticity of the ballast in the traditional railway superstructure is replaced by flexibility between either the discretely supported rails and the concrete sleepers, or the sleepers and the concrete or asphalt slab (e.g., with sleeper boots). The slab itself is relatively inelastic.

Special care is needed for the design of transition zones between conventional and ballastless track, for example near bridges.

=== Advantages ===
The advantages of a ballastless track over a traditional superstructure are its highly consistent track geometry, its longer life span of up to 100 years, and the reduced need for maintenance.

A ballastless track's track geometry is achieved mainly due to its relative inelasticity in comparison to a traditional superstructure. This results in far fewer deformations and generally smoother running; train drivers of the London Overground's East London Line have opined that the Low Vibration Track system is the smoothest superstructure they have experienced. Measurements conducted in Switzerland in 2003 and 2004 showed a standard deviation of the gauge of less than 1.2 millimetres (0.047 in). This in turn increases the track's life span and reduces the need for maintenance. The usual preventive maintenance is limited to rail grinding and, in the case of surface mounted rail, inspection of the rail fixings, since tamping is not necessary due to the absence of ballast. Curative maintenance beyond rail and fixing replacement is required only after several decades. The Swiss Federal Railways replaced the sleepers and rubber shoes of the ballastless track in the 4.9-kilometre (3.0 mi)-long Heitersberg Tunnel between 2014 and 2016, whereas no maintenance of the concrete slab was necessary 39 years after the tunnel's opening.

Due to its good experiences with the system, the Swiss Federal Railways are contemplating installing ballastless track wherever there is a rigid substructure—in tunnels as well as on viaducts. Elsewhere ballastless track is used in the open.

Further advantages of ballastless tracks include better and controlled drainage, the elimination of flying-ballast damage on rolling stock and civil engineering structures, a shallower superstructure, and the possibility of run-over sections such as crossings or shared tram-bus lanes over which pneumatic vehicles can be driven. When used in stations, ballastless tracks are easier to clean.

Embedded track has the potential for increased safety through simple derailment protection and support of broken rails. They alone can also be installed by the efficient placing of the slab using the slipform process. All these benefits lead to increased track access for the traffic.

=== Disadvantages ===
The primary disadvantage of a ballastless track is its sometimes significantly higher cost of initial construction. While numbers vary depending on construction type and track infrastructure (ballastless tracks are generally more suitable to infrastructures that are also made of concrete, as is the case in tunnels or on viaducts), the Deutsche Bahn estimated in 2015 that construction costs of ballastless tracks are in many cases 28 percent higher than those of traditional superstructure. However, the life-cycle cost of ballastless tracks are generally lower than those of ballasted tracks due to significantly lower maintenance.

Further disadvantages of ballastless tracks are the difficulty of adjusting or correcting track geometry once concrete has been set, the necessity of a stable infrastructure (since adjustments to the superstructure can be onerous), generally higher noise emissions, and longer and more expensive repairs when the concrete slab is damaged (for e.g., due to construction faults, wear and tear, or accidents). Inflexibility of the track and the need to be careful with transitions between ballasted and ballastless tracks have been cited as well.

== Construction types ==
Early slab track projects a range of construction types, sub-bases and fastening technologies. The following list contains construction types of ballastless tracks that have been internationally used in heavy-rail systems (as opposed to light railways, tramways, or metros) in chronological order of their first usage.

Classification of ballastless track systems
Type	Subtype	Example
Discrete rail support	Sleepers encased in concrete	Rheda 2000
Discrete rail support	Sleepers on top of bed	ATD, GETRAC
Discrete rail support	Prefabricated concrete slabs	Bögl
Discrete rail support	Monolithic	Lawn track
Continuous rail support	Embedded rail structure	Deck track
Continuous rail support	Continuously supported rail	

=== Rheda 2000 ===
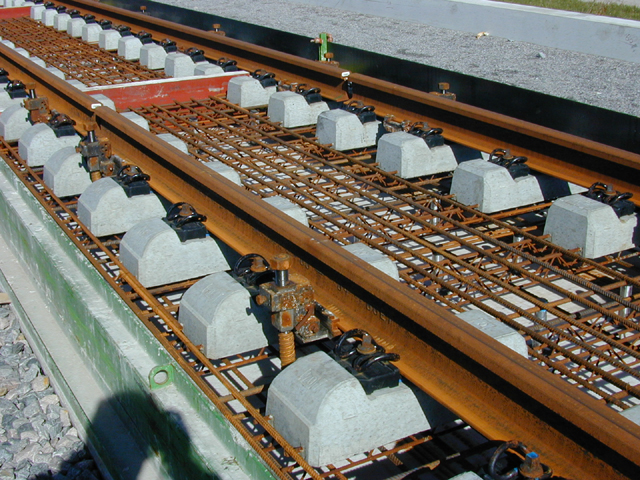
Rheda 2000 before pouring

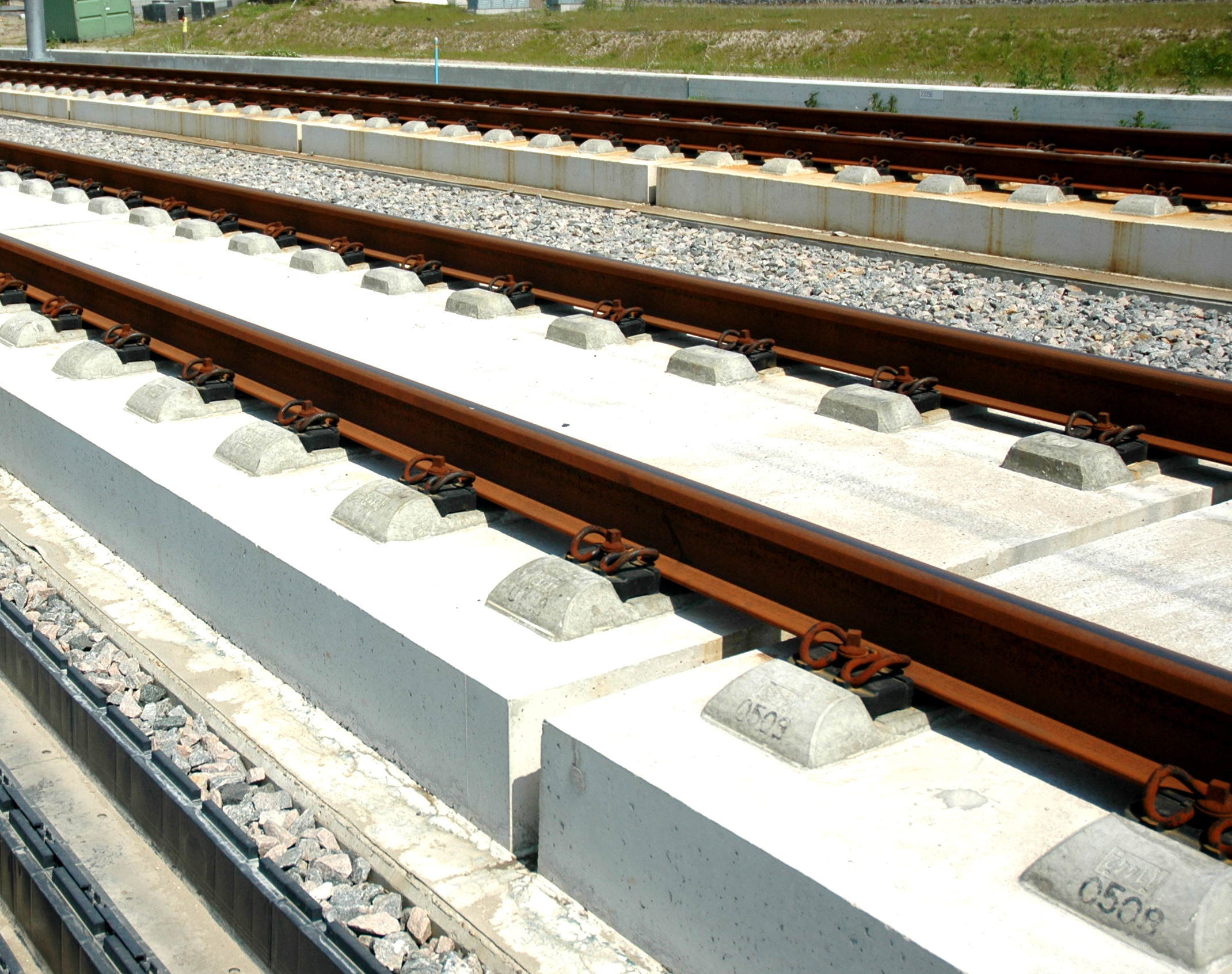
Rheda 2000 after pouring

One of the first applications of ballastless track was in Rheda, Germany, where it was constructed in 1972. This developed into the Rheda 2000 system, first used on the Erfurt–Leipzig/Halle high-speed railway. This system uses sleepers or blocks encased in concrete, poured in-situ.

=== ATD ===
ATD is the abbreviation for Asphalt Supporting layer for Track Direct support. Its characteristics include rails connected to along rail axis connected sleepers made from dual-block concrete installed onto a supporting layer of asphalt. It has been applied to tramways.

=== SBB Bözberg/STEDEF (SBB) ===
The Bözberg/STEDEF system consists of twin sleepers that are connected by a steel track rod and enclosed in a rubber shoe. All of its components can be exchanged individually. Bözberg/STEDEF was first used by the Swiss Federal Railways in the Bözberg tunnel in 1966. STEDEF was further developed by SATEBA.

=== Bögl (Max Bögl) ===
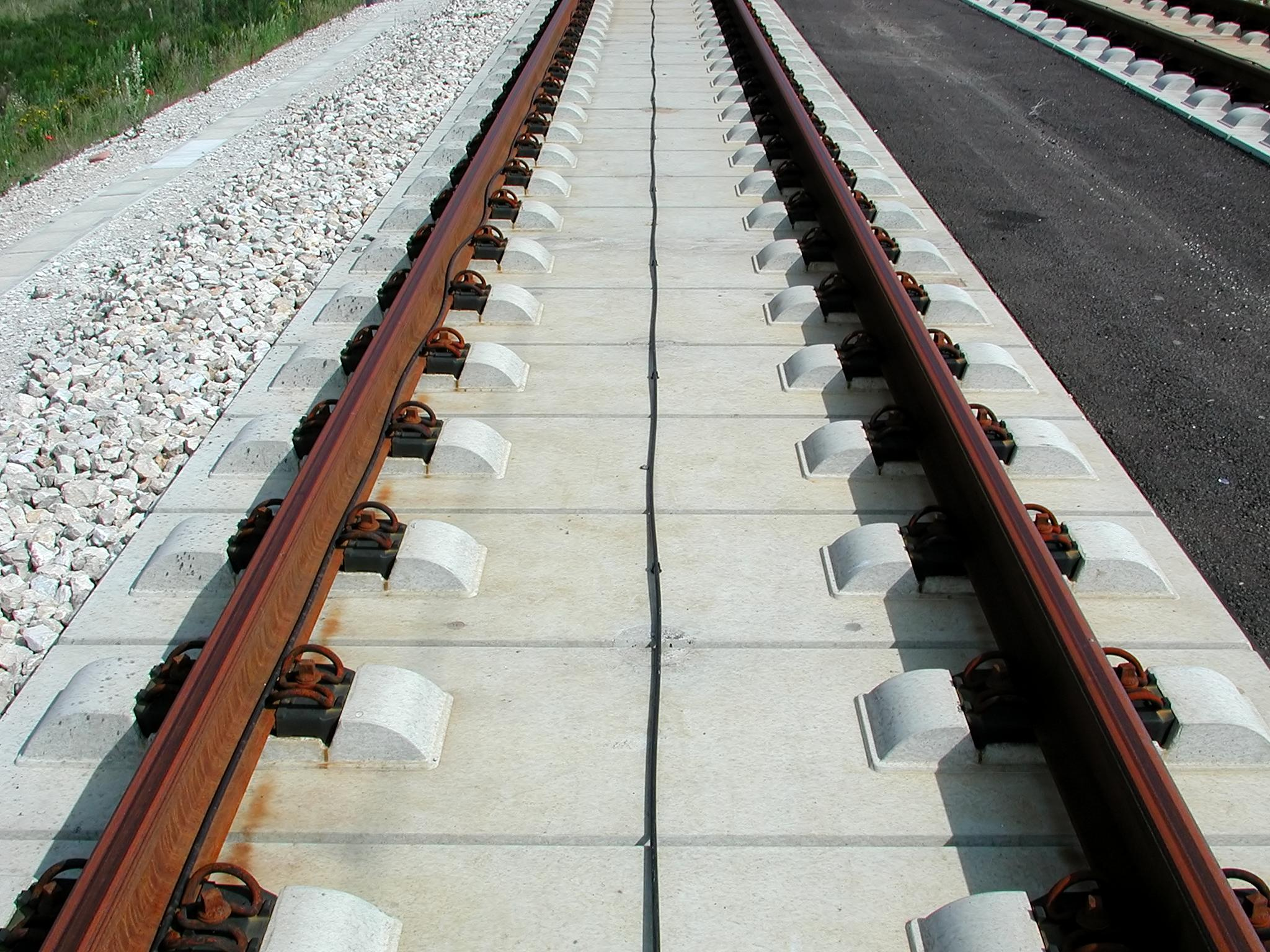
Bögl ballastless track, on the Nuremberg–Ingolstadt high-speed railway

The Bögl ballastless track is characterised by its use of prefabricated concrete slabs in lieu of a continuous structure that is cast on site. Mortar is used to connect the 9-ton slabs to the infrastructure and to one another. The Bögl system was developed in Germany and first tested in Dachau in 1977. The first serial installation took place in Schleswig-Holstein and Heidelberg in 1999. For its use on the high-speed link between Beijing and Shanghai, 406,000 slabs were installed.

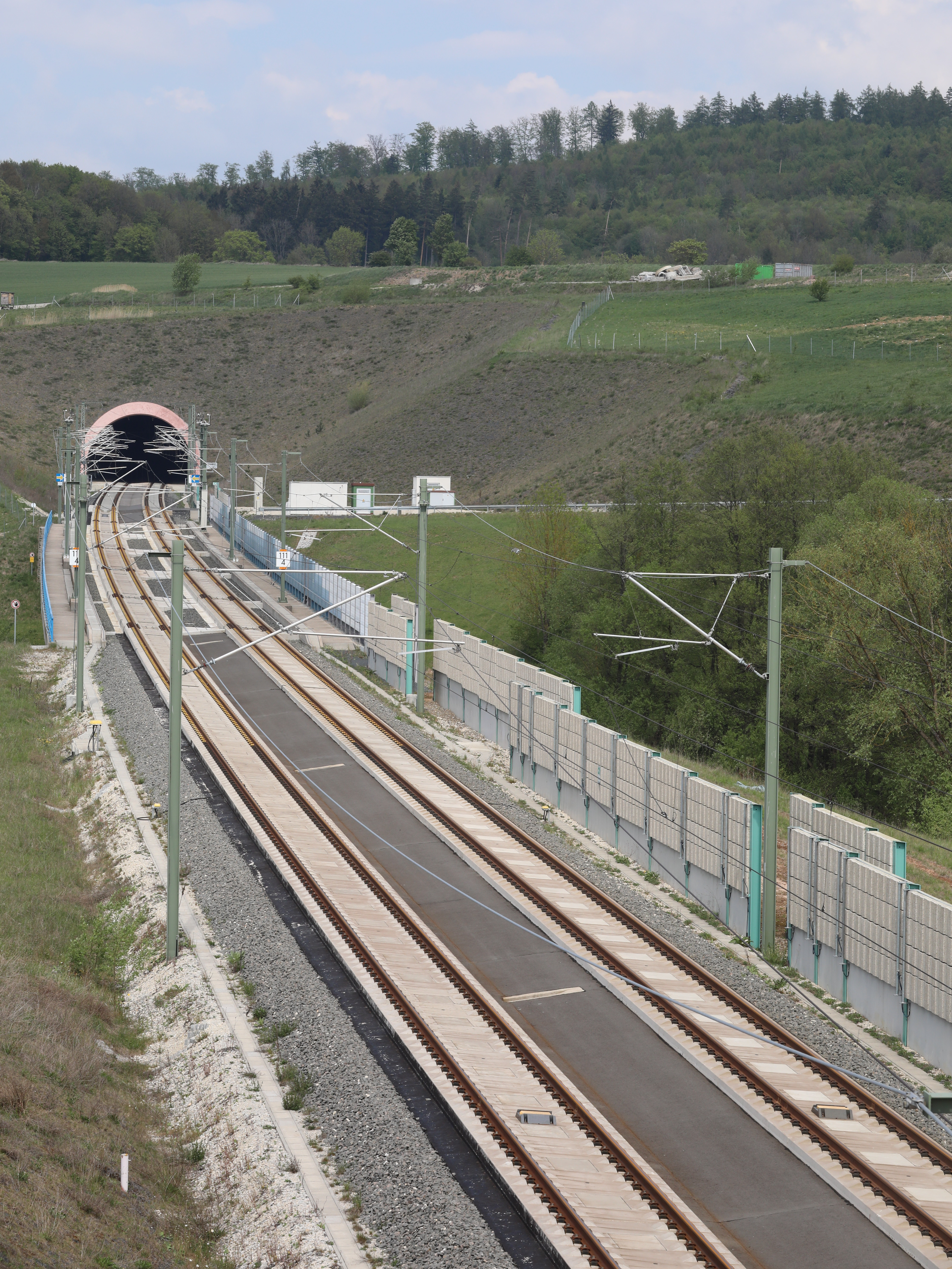
ÖBB/PORR slab track on Nuremberg-Erfurt high speed railway, at the south portal of the Reitersberg tunnel

=== ÖBB/PORR (Slab Track Austria) ===
The ÖBB/PORR ballastless track consists of an elastically supported track slab. It was first tested in 1989, became the standard system in Austria in 1995, and has been used for over 700 kilometres of track worldwide, including the German Verkehrsprojekt Deutsche Einheit Nr. 8 (German Unity Transport Project 8), the Doha metro and Delhi-Meerut RRTS. The system will be used on the United Kingdom's High Speed 2 line, except in tunnels and for some specialist structures.

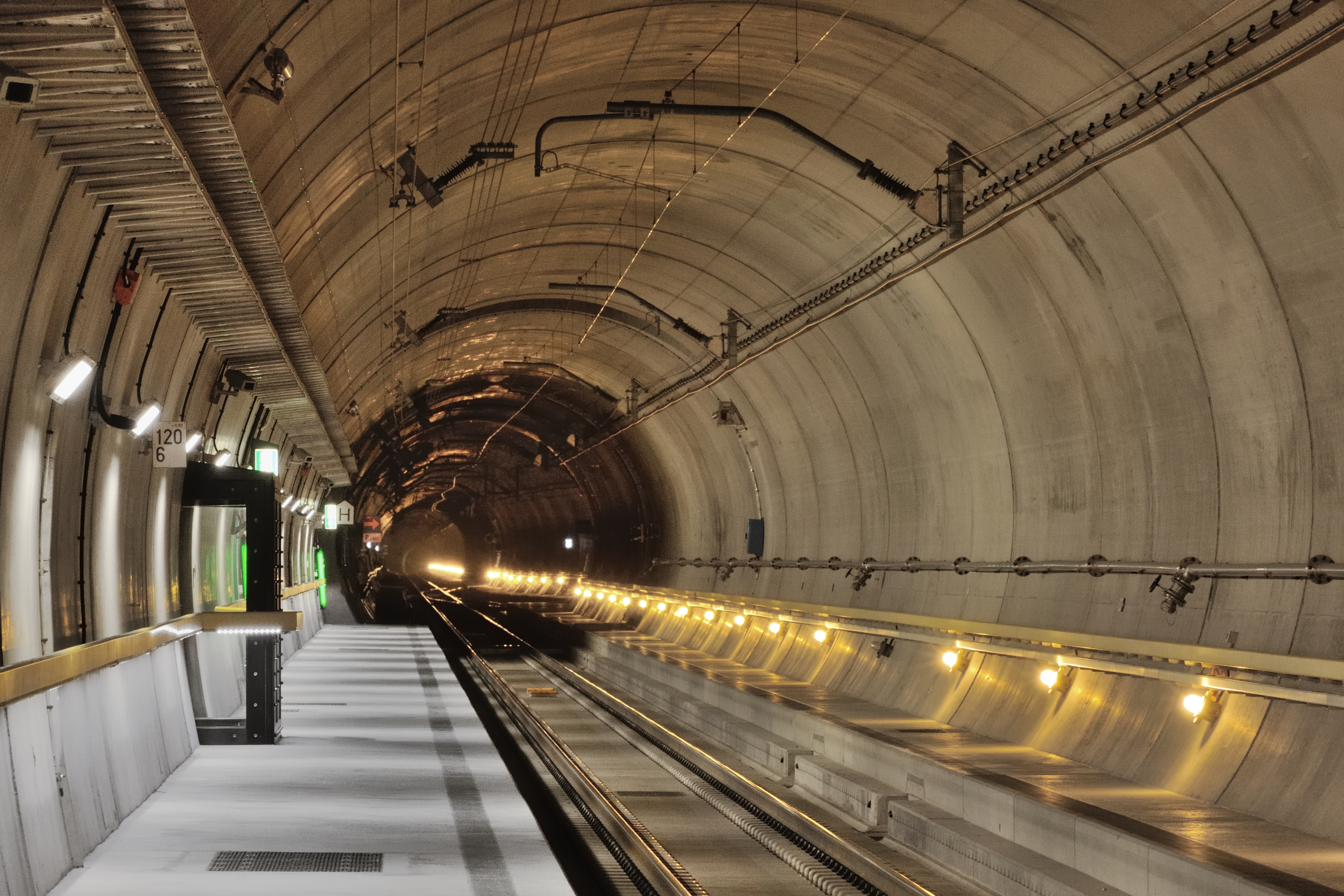
Ballastless track of the type "Low Vibration Track" in the Gotthard Base Tunnel's Sedrun multifunction station

=== Low Vibration Track (Sonneville/Vigier Rail) ===
The Low Vibration Track (LVT) system is similar to Bözberg/STEDEF in that it also uses twin sleepers enclosed in rubber shoes. However, LVT does not feature a tie rod. The system was developed and tested by Roger Sonneville together with the Swiss Federal Railways in the 1990s before the rights were sold to Vigier Rail in 2009. LVT has been in service in the Channel tunnel since 1994. Due to the tunnel's German name Eurotunnel, LVT is sometimes referred to as Euroblock. LVT has been used for over 1300 kilometres of track worldwide, including the Swiss Lötschberg, Gotthard and Ceneri base tunnels, the South Korean high-speed Suin Line between Songdo and Incheon, the Turkish Marmaray project, and the London Overground's East London line, as well as on viaducts in urban areas. LVT has become the standard ballastless-track system in Switzerland.

=== IVES ===
The IVES system (Intelligent, Versatile, Efficient and Solid) is a product of Rhomberg Rail. The system consists of a base layer (preferably common asphalt concrete) and concrete lateral structural elements, in which the rail-fastening elements of the type DFF 304 are directly embedded – no sleepers are needed. The necessary elasticity is given only by a flexible intermediate plate in the rail-fastening elements.

The structural elements of this system are individually manufactured and can be positioned laterally or longitudinally onto the base layer. The structural elements have recesses in the top, where the rail-fastening elements are placed into. Afterwards, the rails are lifted onto the fastening elements and a track grid is established. The grid's exact position can now be adjusted vertically and laterally. At last, the rail-fastening elements are friction-locked to the structural elements with high-strength grouting mortar. Thanks to its versatile construction and easy installation, IVES is suitable for all rail types.

After testing, the first IVES track has been installed in the Asfordby Tunnel of the Old Dalby Test Track in England in 2013 and since then, seven more IVES tracks have been built. The longest IVES track runs through the Bruggwaldtunnel in Switzerland, with a total length of 1,731 m (5,679 ft).

=== Deck track ===
Deck track consists of an endless concrete beam which is buried in the ground with the track fixed directly on top of it. The concrete beam is made hollow to match the soil density. Due to the large diameter of the hollow beam and its light weight, it is particularly suitable for low-profile designs on soft soils. Deck track has been implemented on small sections of the Havenspoorlijn Rotterdam, which is part of the Betuweroute.

== See also ==
- Baulk track
