= Berlin–Munich high-speed railway =

Railway line in Germany

The Berlin–Munich high-speed railway is a 623 km (387 mi) high-speed rail line connecting the German cities of Berlin, Leipzig, Erfurt, Nuremberg, and Munich. The line was opened on 10 December 2017. The line was first planned in 1991 as part of the "Travel Project for German Unity" - a scheme of linking up east and west German travel infrastructure after reunification. About two million passengers traveled the route in its first year of operation, exceeding the expectation of the rail operator Deutsche Bahn.

The new line reduced travel time by train between Berlin and Munich from 6 hours to currently 3 hours and 45 minutes.

Construction began in 1996 and cost about €10 billion ($11.8 billion), making it the most expensive transport project in Germany since reunification. The line traverses the Thuringian Forest and required the construction of 22 tunnels and 29 bridges.
