= Ammendorf/Beesen =

Coordinates: 51.4269°N 11.9825°E

Ammendorf/Beesen is a suburb to the south of the city of Halle, Saxony-Anhalt, Germany. It consists of the formerly independent villages of Ammendorf and Beesen.

== History ==
The first evidence of a settlement of the area date from the Neolithic period. The first written documentation dates from 1214 in Urkundenbuch Ammendorfs der Stadthalle. The eponymous Ammendorf family originated here.
