= Berlin North–South mainline =

Major commuter railway in the German capital

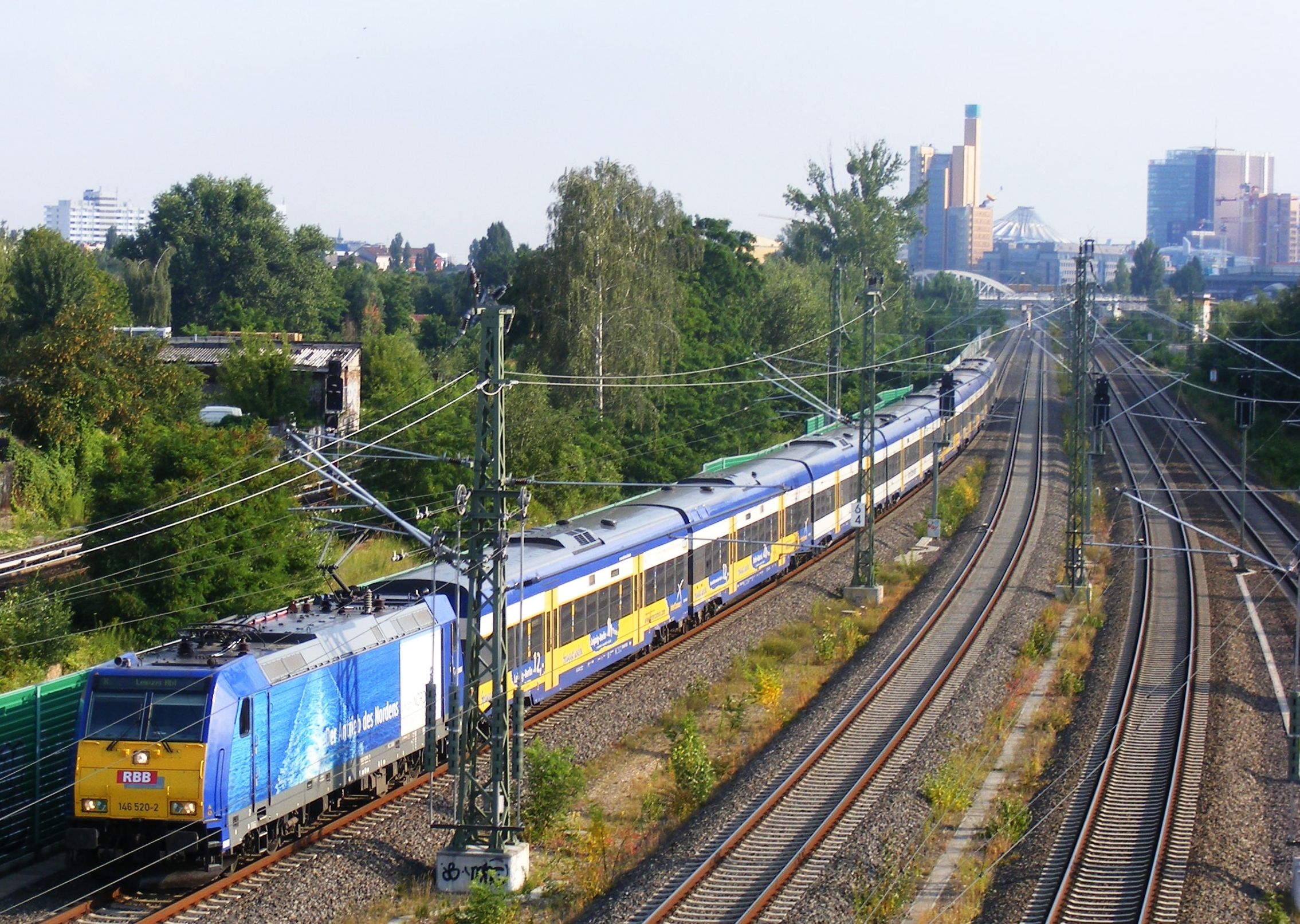
- Line between tunnel exit and Südkreuz with an InterConnex train

Overview
- Native name: Nord-Süd-Fernbahn
- Line number: 6171 (whole line); 6134 (tracks 3/4 Hbf–Südkreuz)
- Termini: Wedding; Südkreuz

Service
- Route number: 203, 204, 205

Technical
- Line length: 9.053 km (5.625 mi)
- Track gauge: 1,435 mm (4 ft 8 1/2 in) standard gauge
- Electrification: 15 kV/16.7 Hz AC Overhead catenary
- Operating speed: 120 km/h (75 mph) (maximum)

The Berlin North-South main line (German: Nord-Süd-Fernbahn), also called the North-South link (Nord-Süd-Verbindung) is an electrified railway line in Berlin which was opened in 2006. It is an important component of the "mushroom concept" (Pilzkonzept), which was adopted for long-distance and regional rail services through the city. The line's core is an approximately 3.5 km (2.2 mi) Tiergarten tunnel under the Tiergarten in Berlin. The tunnel section includes the underground level of Berlin Hauptbahnhof (main station) and the Potsdamer Platz regional station. The above-ground section of the line includes the Berlin Südkreuz station.

== Route ==
=== General ===
The line is a four-track connection between the Ringbahn (Ring line) in the north of Berlin via the Berlin Hauptbahnhof to Südkreuz and the Anhalt Railway in the south. North of the Hauptbahnhof the line divides into two double-track lines. One of them runs east, the other west, both running on to the Ring line. The tunnel and the connection to the northeast are entirely new lines. The connection from the tunnel to the north-west to Moabit follows the course of the Lehrter railway. The southern section runs above ground through the former yards of the Anhalt Railway.

=== Northern section ===
The route from Wedding junction starts at a grade-separated junction towards the southwest from the Ring line’s mainline tracks. It first crosses over the southern mainline track of the Ring line, and is rising. It then runs across a bridge, called the Überflieger (overflyer) that crosses the Berlin-Spandau navigation canal, Perleberger Straße (street), the lines of the old Lehrter railway, the freight lines serving the Hamburger and Lehrter stations and one of the tracks of the new Lehrter line. The line descends to the south and reaches the level of the tracks of the Lehrter railway at the entrance to the tunnel and then descends a ramp with a gradient of 2.5 per cent.

=== Tunnel ===
Not far beyond the tunnel entrance is the lower level of the Berlin Hauptbahnhof with its eight platforms. South of the station the line passes under the Spree river. The tunnel turns southeast to Potsdamer Platz station and then back to the south. It passes under the Landwehr Canal and rises to the surface again near of Gleisdreieck U-Bahn station on a ramp with a gradient of 3.0 per cent.

=== Southern section ===
East of the tunnel exit is the site of the disused Anhalter freight yard. The bridges on the line over Yorckstraße lie between the S-Bahn to the west and the disused bridges of the tracks to the former freight yard. Continuing south, the line runs along the former route of the Anhalter line parallel to the S-Bahn. The line has one S-Bahn and three long-distance double-sided platforms on the lower level of Südkreuz station, below the Ringbahn S-Bahn platform. After Südkreuz the line crosses the extensive facilities of the former Tempelhof marshalling yard. The former mainline of the Anhalter railway ran to the west next to the S-Bahn tracks in today's Südgelände Nature Park. The line ends at Südkreuz south end junction, more than a kilometre south of the Südkreuz platforms. The line continues as the Anhalter railway. The grade-separated junction with the Dresden railway is nearby. Also nearby is the freight line connecting the Ring railway with the freight yard at Marienfelde.

== History ==
In 1882 the Stadtbahn was opened crossing central Berlin east to west. Plans since the beginning of the 20th century for a similar line from north to south for a long time came to nothing. The North-South tunnel built in the 1930s through the city centre only serves the S-Bahn.

After the reunification of Germany and Berlin in 1990, a north-south line for mainline trains through Berlin was discussed. The use of the Stadtbahn for mainline trains meant that many connections required a devious route and in addition the limit of its capacity was expected to be reached soon. Among the various options discussed and then adopted was the so-called mushroom concept (German: Pilzkonzept), which provided for a partially underground north-south route, which crossed the Stadtbahn at the Hauptbahnhof.

In April 1992, the mushroom concept was added to the Federal Transport Infrastructure Plan. Its core would be a new 8-kilometre (5.0 mi)-long route through the city with a 3.5 km (2.2 mi) long tunnel. Construction began on 13 October 1995. In 2001, reconstruction began on the Papestraße S-Bahn station, creating the new Südkreuz station. In 2002, construction began on the southern section of the above ground line, originally planned to be opened in 2002. After a series of delays, including flooding in 1997, the track, tunnels and Hauptbahnhof was finally inaugurated on 27 May 2006 and put into scheduled operation a day later.

Compared to the original schedule, the project scope has been reduced. A link to the trunk line towards Potsdam was not built. Instead only some structural preparations for a connection in the southern part of the tunnel were built. The connection of the Dresden Railway to Berlin was completed in 2025. The Südkreuz station was originally opened with only two of its three long-distance platforms. The third platform was not connected to the network until late 2007 to provide additional capacity during traffic disruptions.

== Rail services ==
The route is open only for passenger trains; freight is not allowed. The terms of access require the use of a retention toilet system and the use of eddy current brakes is not permitted on the line. Diesel trains can only run on the line in an emergency (such as towing a wrecked train).

The following table shows the services of long-distance and regional lines, which run on the north-south main line (as of 2026): services run from Spandau on the Lehrter line to the meeting of the two lines at the northern end of the Hauptbahnhof and from Gesundbrunnen on the Wedding branch to the north-south mainline. All trains go via Berlin Hauptbahnhof; almost all continue to Südkreuz.

Line	Route		Interval
ICE 3	Saarbrücken – Kaiserslautern – Mannheim –	Frankfurt – Spandau – Berlin Hbf – Südkreuz	Every 4 hours
ICE 3	Frankfurt Airport Regional –	Frankfurt – Spandau – Berlin Hbf – Südkreuz	Every 4 hours
ICE 6	Gesundbrunnen – Berlin Hbf – Südkreuz – Nürnberg – Stuttgart		Once a day
ICE 11	Gesundbrunnen – Berlin Hbf – Südkreuz – Lutherstadt Wittenberg – Leipzig – Erfurt – Fulda – Frankfurt – Mannheim – Stuttgart – Augsburg – Munich (– Innsbruck)		Every 2 hours
ICE 15	Frankfurt – Erfurt – Halle – Südkreuz – Berlin – Gesundbrunnen		Every 2 hours
ICE 16	Berlin Südkreuz – Berlin – Berlin-Spandau – Hanover – Bremen – Delmenhorst – Oldenburg		Every 4 hours
IC 17	Chemnitz – Dresden – BER Airport – Berlin Südkreuz – Berlin – Berlin Gesundbrunnen – Oranienburg – Rostock		Every 2 hours
ICE 18	Hamburg-Altona – Berlin Hbf – Südkreuz – Bitterfeld – Halle – Erfurt – Erlangen – Nuremberg – Ingolstadt / Augsburg – Munich		Every 2 hours
RJ 27	(Copenhagen –) Hamburg– Berlin Hbf – Südkreuz – Dresden ( – Prague – Brno – Budapest/Graz)		Every 2 hours
ICE 27	Westerland – Niebüll – Husum – Heide – Itzehoe – Hamburg – Berlin – Berlin Südkreuz		1 train pair
ICE 28	Ostseebad Binz – Stralsund –	Berlin Hbf – Südkreuz – Leipzig – Erfurt – Bamberg – Nuremberg – (Ingolstadt –) Augsburg – Munich	1 train pair
ICE 28	Hamburg-Altona –	Berlin Hbf – Südkreuz – Leipzig – Erfurt – Bamberg – Nuremberg – (Ingolstadt –) Augsburg – Munich	Every 2 hours
ICE 29	Gesundbrunnen – Berlin Hbf – Südkreuz – Halle – Erfurt – Nuremberg – Munich		Hourly
FEX	Airport Express; Berlin Hbf – Potsdamer Platz – Südkreuz – BER Airport		15 min
RE 3	Stralsund/Schwedt – Gesundbrunnen – Berlin Hbf – Potsdamer Platz – Südkreuz – Wünsdorf-Waldstadt – (Elsterwerda)		Hourly
RE 4	(Wismar) – Wittenberge – Spandau – Berlin Hbf – Potsdamer Platz – Südkreuz – Ludwigsfelde – Jüterbog		Hourly
RE 5	Rostock/Stralsund – Neustrelitz – Gesundbrunnen – Berlin Hbf – Potsdamer Platz – Südkreuz – Wünsdorf-Waldstadt – (Elsterwerda)		Hourly
RB 14	Südkreuz – Potsdamer Platz – Berlin Hbf – Jungfernheide – Spandau – Falkensee – Nauen		Hourly

In addition, there are a number of less regular services. The night train runs between Paris and Berlin-Südkreuz. A number of additional Intercity (IC) trains run at the weekend towards Hanover and Cologne as well as to Frankfurt am Main use the route. Most of the ICE and IC trains run on these routes, on the other hand, use the Stadtbahn. Deutsche Bahn has made relatively little use of the capacity of the four-track line. Initially it was planned to run ICE trains from Frankfurt to Südkreuz. Those plans came to nothing, however, because there were no equivalent for the maintenance of trains to the Rummelsburg yard that was available for trains on the Stadtbahn that would not require additional expenditure.

Given the lack of an S-Bahn connection to Berlin Hauptbahnhof in the north-south direction, there was a proposal to use the spare capacity of the north-south mainline for the S-Bahn. However, it has now been agreed to build a new S-Bahn line from the northern Ring Bahn to Hauptbahnhof, extending it eventually to Potsdamer Platz.

Since upgrades on the Berlin Dresden railway, the airport express (FEX) runs through the tunnel.
