= Berlin Gesundbrunnen station =

Railway station in Berlin

Berlin Gesundbrunnen
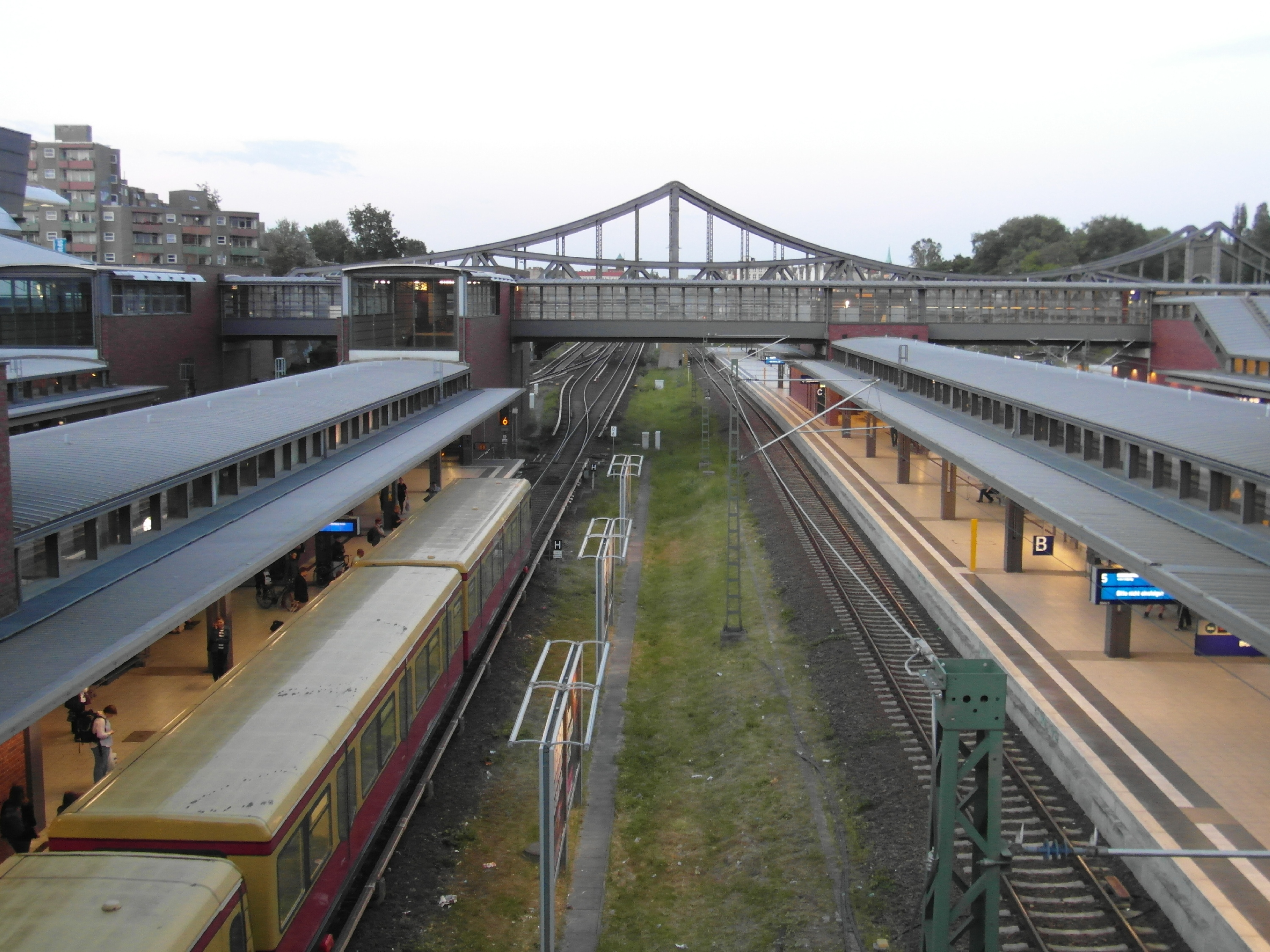
- Berlin Gesundbrunnen in 2012

General information
- Location: Badstraße 1-3; Mitte, Berlin; Germany
- Coordinates: 52°32′55″N 13°23′22″E
- Owner: Deutsche Bahn
- Operator: DB InfraGO
- Lines: Berlin Ringbahn (KBS 200.41) (KBS 200.42); Berlin–Szczecin railway (KBS 200.2) (KBS 203) (KBS 205); Berlin Northern Railway (KBS 200.1) (KBS 200.25)
- Platforms: 5 island platforms
- Tracks: 10

Construction
- Accessible: Yes

Other information
- Station code: 528
- DS100 code: BGS (long distance); BGB (S-Bahn)
- IBNR: 8011102 (long distance); 8089015 (S-Bahn)
- Category: 1
- Fare zone: : Berlin A/5555
- Website: www.bahnhof.de

History
- Opened: 1 January 1872; 154 years ago

Passengers
- 130,000
Services
Preceding station	DB Fernverkehr	Following station
Berlin Hbf towards Stuttgart Hbf	ICE 6 Sprinter	Terminus
Berlin Hbf towards München Hbf	ICE 11	Terminus
Berlin Hbf towards Saarbrücken Hbf	ICE 15	Eberswalde Hbf towards Ostseebad Binz
Berlin-Wannsee towards Rostock Hbf	IC 17	Oranienburg towards Dresden Hbf or Chemnitz Hbf
Berlin Hbf towards München Hbf	ICE 18	Terminus
Berlin Hbf towards München Hbf	ICE 28	Bernau bei Berlin towards Ostseebad Binz
Berlin Hbf towards München Hbf	ICE 29 Sprinter	Terminus
Berlin Hbf towards Wien Hbf	ICE 91	Terminus
Terminus	EC 95	Berlin Lichtenberg towards Warszawa Wschodnia or Gdynia Główna
Terminus	EC 96	Berlin Lichtenberg towards Przemyśl Główny
Preceding station		Following station
Berlin Hbf towards Stuttgart Hbf	FLX 10	Terminus
Preceding station	DB Regio Nordost	Following station
Berlin Hbf towards Jüterbog or Lutherstadt Wittenberg Hbf	RE 3	Bernau bei Berlin towards Stralsund Hbf or Schwedt
Oranienburg towards Rostock Hbf or Stralsund Hbf	RE 5	Berlin Hbf towards Berlin Südkreuz
Berlin Jungfernheide towards Potsdam Hbf	RB 21	Terminus
Preceding station	Niederbarnimer Eisenbahn	Following station
Terminus	RB 27 selected trains only	Schönerlinde towards Klosterfelde
Preceding station	Berlin S-Bahn	Following station
Bornholmer Straße towards Oranienburg	S1	Humboldthain towards Wannsee
Wedding towards Berlin Hbf	S15	Terminus
Bornholmer Straße towards Bernau	S2	Humboldthain towards Blankenfelde
Bornholmer Straße towards Hennigsdorf	S25	Humboldthain towards Teltow Stadt
Bornholmer Straße towards Blankenburg	S26	Humboldthain towards Teltow Stadt
Wedding One-way operation	S41	Schönhauser Allee Ringbahn (clockwise)
Wedding Ringbahn (counter-clockwise)	S42	Schönhauser Allee One-way operation
Preceding station	Berlin U-Bahn	Following station
Pankstraße towards Wittenau	U8	Voltastraße towards Hermannstraße
Location

Berlin Gesundbrunnen station (German: Bahnhof Berlin Gesundbrunnen) is a railway station in Berlin, Germany. It is situated in the Gesundbrunnen district, part of the central Mitte borough, as an interconnection point between the northern Ringbahn and Nord-Süd Tunnel lines of the Berlin S-Bahn, as well as a regional and long distance station of the Deutsche Bahn network. The station is operated by the DB Station&Service subsidiary of Deutsche Bahn AG and is classified as a Category 1 station, one of 21 in Germany and four in Berlin, the others being Berlin Hauptbahnhof, Berlin Südkreuz and Berlin Ostbahnhof.

== History ==
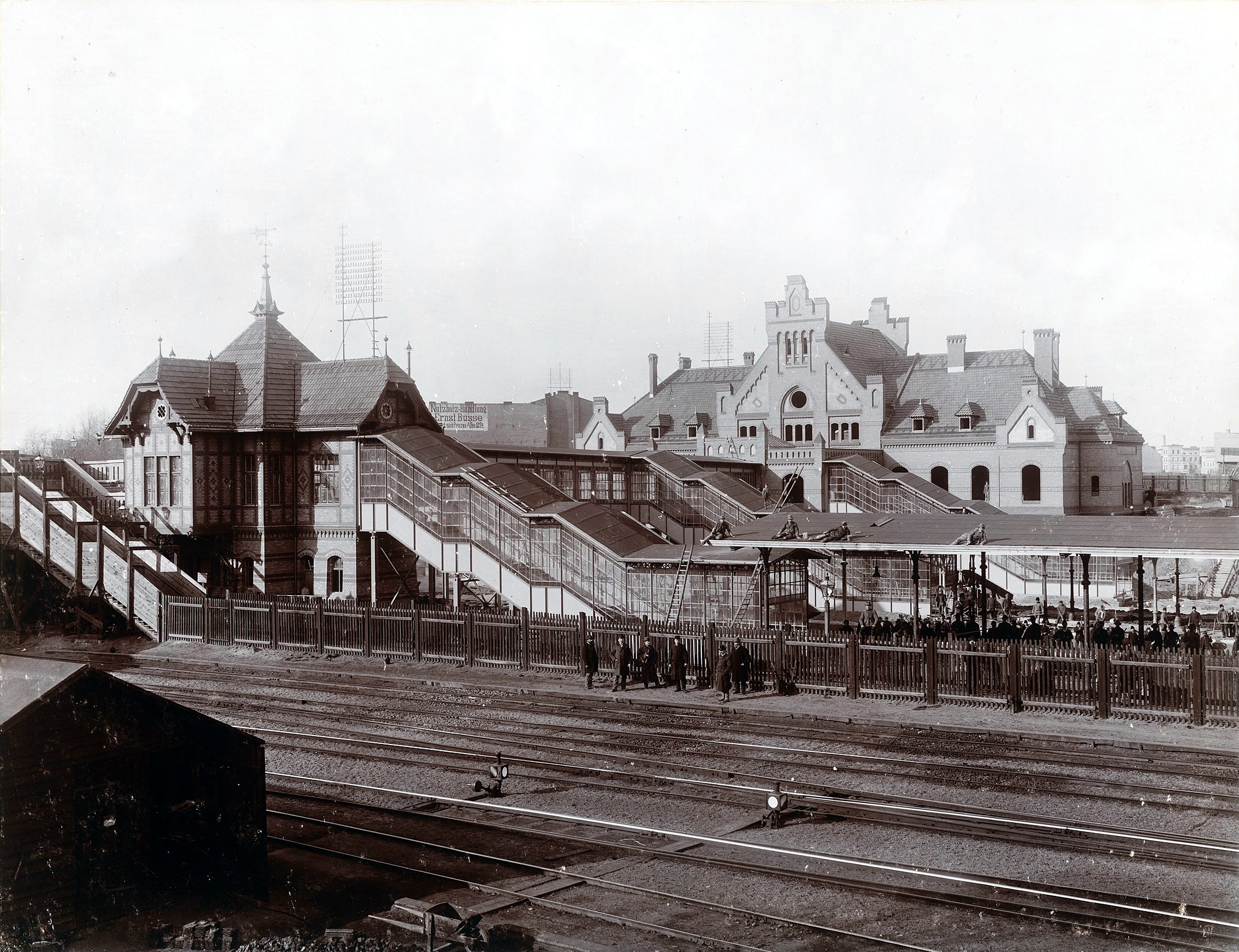
Rebuilt Gesundbrunnen station in 1898

When the Berlin–Stettin railway was opened in 1842, the tracks ran farther northwestwards with a hazardous level crossing on Badstraße. Nearby Gesundbrunnen station was inaugurated on 1 January 1872 with the northern Ringbahn line; it became an important railway hub with the opening of the Berlin Northern Railway to Neubrandenburg; the junction was finished on 10 July 1877. From 1 May 1897, it also offered access to the Berlin–Stettin line, whose original tracks were shifted southwards to meet the parallel Ringbahn here.

On 8 August 1924 Gesundbrunnen was one of the first stations to become part of the Berlin S-Bahn system when third rail trains ran from Stettiner Bahnhof to Bernau. After the opening of the Nord-Süd Tunnel in 1939, trains ran from Gesundbrunnen via Humboldthain station and Stettiner Bahnhof directly to Anhalter Bahnhof in the south.

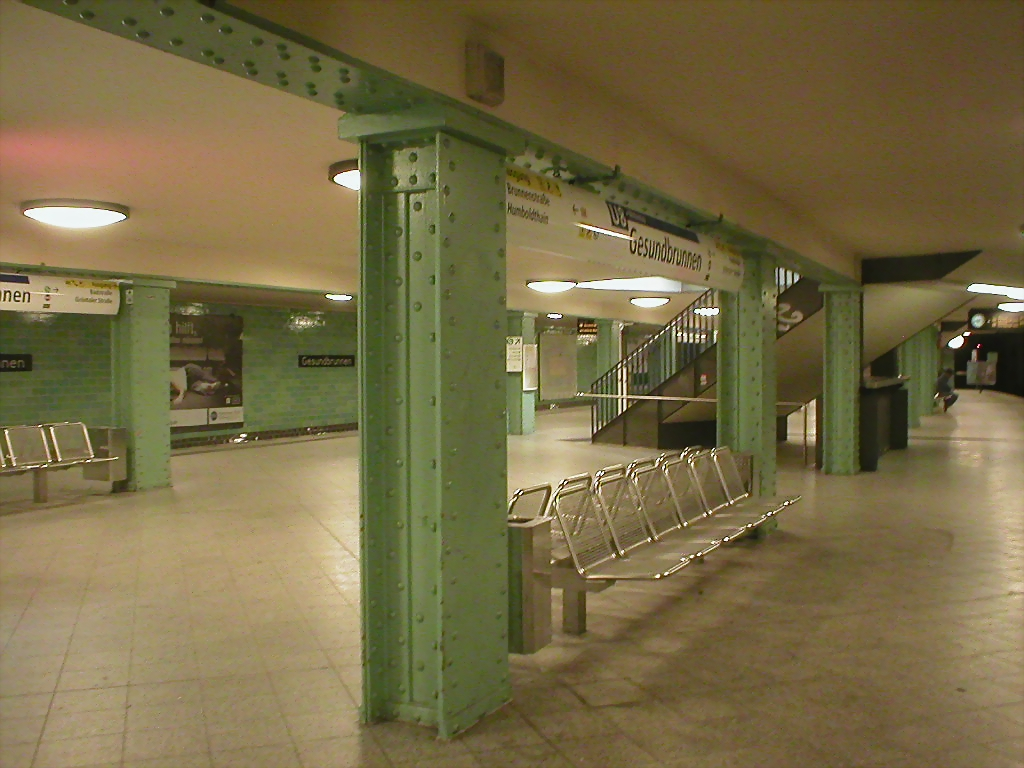
U-Bahn platform

Plans for an access of Gesundbrunnen station to the Berlin U-Bahn network were already developed by the AEG electric company prior to World War I. Nevertheless, the present-day station, located on the U8, was not opened until 18 April 1930. Designed in a New Objectivity style according to plans by Alfred Grenander with a separate reception building, the U-Bahn platform crossed deep beneath the railway tracks and served as an air-raid shelter during the bombing of Berlin in World War II.

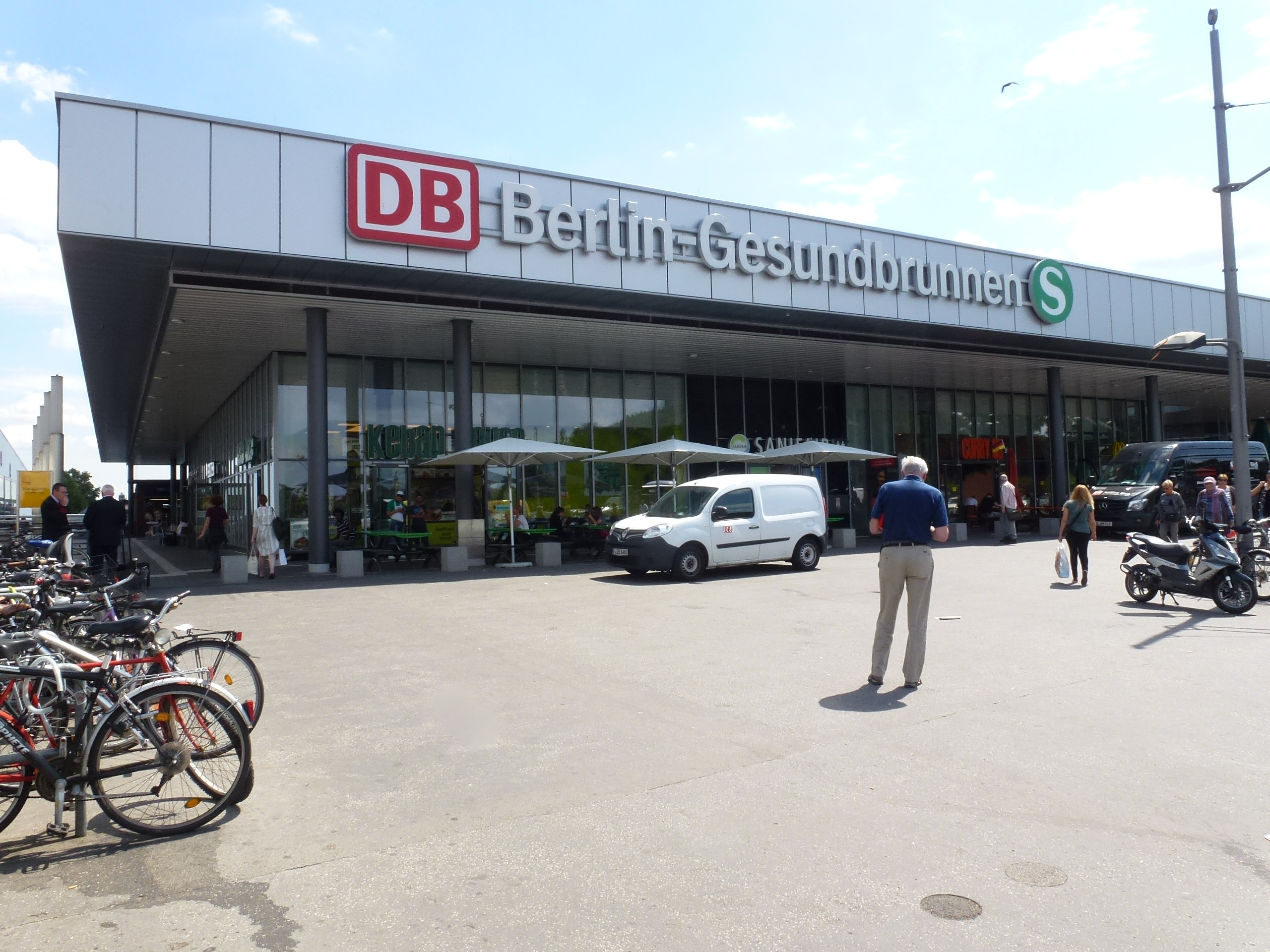
New entrance building

=== World War II and Cold War ===
On 3 February 1945, this station was destroyed by an air raid.

After World War II and the division of Berlin, long-distance train service diminished and was finally discontinued on 18 May 1952. The S-Bahn system was also affected by the construction of the Berlin Wall in 1961, when the network was partitioned into an eastern and western half.

=== Fall of the Berlin Wall ===
In the Pilzkonzept master plan the station was modernized as Berlin's northern long-distance train station and during 2005 there were discussions to rename the station to Nordkreuz (North Cross) reflecting the names of the other connection stations on the Ringbahn namely Ostkreuz (East Cross), Südkreuz (South Cross) and Westkreuz (West Cross). Work on the railway hub was completed on 26 May 2006, with no development on the rename until 2016, when Nordkreuz was appended to Gesundbrunnen as an official alternative name.

Despite its station category 1 the station had no representative entrance building - the old entrance building had been demolished and it had never been replaced giving the new station a peculiar appearance. The area designated for the entrance building was left as a public open space (Hanne-Sobek-Platz). The planning was stopped not only by financial cuts but also due to the existence of the nearby Gesundbrunnen-Center shopping center that was opened in 1997 offering 25000 square meters of shopping facilities plus a direct connection to the railway station. The planning resumed during 2010 and construction work on a new entrance building began by the end of 2011, with the 3300 square meters projected to cost a total of 7.4 million euros. The new entrance building opened in autumn 2015.

== Rail services ==
=== Long-distance services ===
The station was served by the following long-distance services in 2026:

Line	Route			Frequency
ICE 6	Stuttgart – Nuremberg – Berlin Südkreuz – Berlin – Berlin Gesundbrunnen			Once a day
ICE 11	Munich – Stuttgart – Mannheim – Frankfurt – Erfurt – Leipzig – Berlin – Berlin Gesundbrunnen			Every two hours
ICE 15	Saarbrücken – Kaiserslautern – Mannheim – Darmstadt – Frankfurt – Erfurt – Halle – Berlin – Berlin Gesundbrunnen – Stralsund – Binz			Every two hours
IC 17	Rostock – Waren – Neustrelitz – Oranienburg – Berlin Gesundbrunnen – Berlin Hbf – Berlin Südkreuz – Flughafen BER – Doberlug-Kirchhain – Elsterwerda – Dresden-Neustadt – Dresden Hbf (– Freiberg – Chemnitz)			Every two hours
ICE 18	Berlin Gesundbrunnen – Berlin – Halle – Erfurt – Nuremberg – Munich			Some trains
ICE/ECE 20	Berlin Gesundbrunnen – Berlin – Leipzig – Erfurt – Fulda – Frankfurt – Karlsruhe – Freiburg – Basel – Zürich			5 train pairs
ICE 28	München – Nürnberg – Erfurt – Leipzig – Lutherstadt Wittenberg – Berlin Gesundbrunnen – (Stralsund – Ostseebad Binz)			Some trains
ICE 29	Ostseebad Binz – Stralsund – Greifswald – Prenzlau – Eberswalde– Berlin Gesundbrunnen – Berlin – Halle – Erfurt –	Nuremberg – Augsburg – Munich		3 train pairs
ICE 29	Ostseebad Binz – Stralsund – Greifswald – Prenzlau – Eberswalde– Berlin Gesundbrunnen – Berlin – Halle – Erfurt –	Nuremberg (train split)	Augsburg – Munich	One train pair
ICE 29	Ostseebad Binz – Stralsund – Greifswald – Prenzlau – Eberswalde– Berlin Gesundbrunnen – Berlin – Halle – Erfurt –	Nuremberg (train split)	Passau – Linz – Wien (running with ICE 91)	One train pair
IC 56	Rostock – Waren – Neustrelitz – Oranienburg – Berlin Gesundbrunnen – Berlin Hbf – Potsdam – Brandenburg – Magdeburg			One train towards Magdeburg
FLX 10	Berlin Gesundbrunnen – Berlin Hbf – Halle (Saale) – Erfurt – Frankfurt (Main) – Heidelberg – Stuttgart			One train pair

In March 2026 GoVolta services began calling.

=== Regional services ===
The station was served by the following regional services in 2026:

Line	Route		Frequency
RE 3	Lutherstadt Wittenberg – Jüterbog – Ludwigsfelde – Berlin Gesundbrunnen – Eberswalde – Angermünde –	Schwedt (Oder)	
RE 3	Lutherstadt Wittenberg – Jüterbog – Ludwigsfelde – Berlin Gesundbrunnen – Eberswalde – Angermünde –	Prenzlau – Pasewalk – Greifswald – Stralsund	
RE 5	Berlin Südkreuz – Berlin Potsdamer Platz – Berlin Gesundbrunnen – Oranienburg – Neustrelitz –	Güstrow – Rostock	
RE 5	Berlin Südkreuz – Berlin Potsdamer Platz – Berlin Gesundbrunnen – Oranienburg – Neustrelitz –	Neubrandenburg – Stralsund	
RB 21	Berlin Gesundbrunnen – Berlin Jungfernheide – Berlin-Spandau – Dallgow-Döberitz – Wustermark – Golm – Potsdam		60 min
RB 27	Berlin Gesundbrunnen – Schönerlinde – Schönwalde – Basdorf – Klosterfelde		Some trains

=== S-Bahn and U-Bahn services ===
Gesundbrunnen is a station on Berlin S-Bahn and Berlin U-Bahn networks. The station was served by the following services in 2026:

- S1 (Oranienburg – Frohnau – Wittenau – Gesundbrunnen – Friedrichstraße – Schöneberg – Rathaus Steglitz – Wannsee)
- S15 (Hauptbahnhof – Wedding – Gesundbrunnen)
- S2 (Bernau – Karow – Pankow – Gesundbrunnen – Friedrichstraße – Südkreuz – Blankenfelde)
- S25 (Hennigsdorf – Tegel – Gesundbrunnen – Friedrichstraße – Südkreuz – Teltow Stadt)
- S26 (Blankenburg – Gesundbrunnen – Friedrichstraße – Südkreuz – Teltow Stadt)
- S41 (Ring Clockwise) (Gesundbrunnen – Ostkreuz – Treptower Park - Hermannstraße – Südkreuz – Innsbrucker Platz – Westkreuz – Westend – Gesundbrunnen)
- S42 (Ring Anti-clockwise) (Gesundbrunnen – Westend – Westkreuz – Innsbrucker Platz – Südkreuz – Hermannstraße – Treptower Park – Ostkreuz – Gesundbrunnen)
- U8 (Wittenau – Osloer Straße – Gesundbrunnen – Alexanderplatz – Hermannstraße)

== See also ==
- List of railway stations in the Berlin area
- Rail transport in Germany
