= Voltastraße station =

Station of the Berlin U-Bahn

Coordinates: 52°32′32″N 13°23′35″E

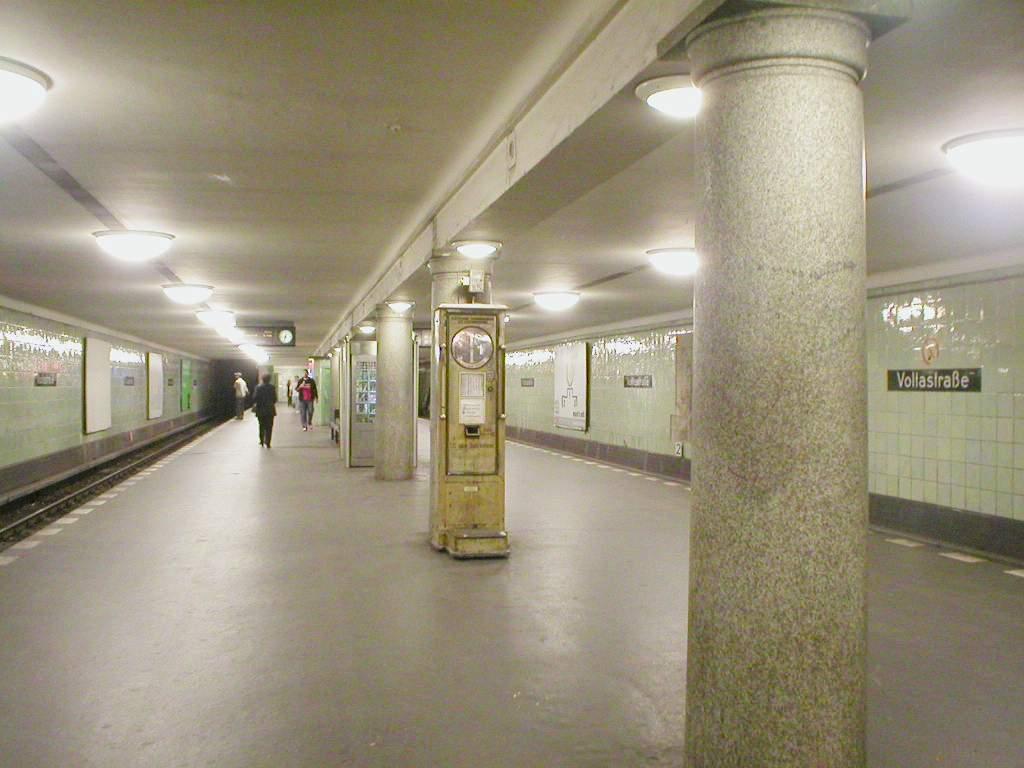
U-Bahn station Voltastraße

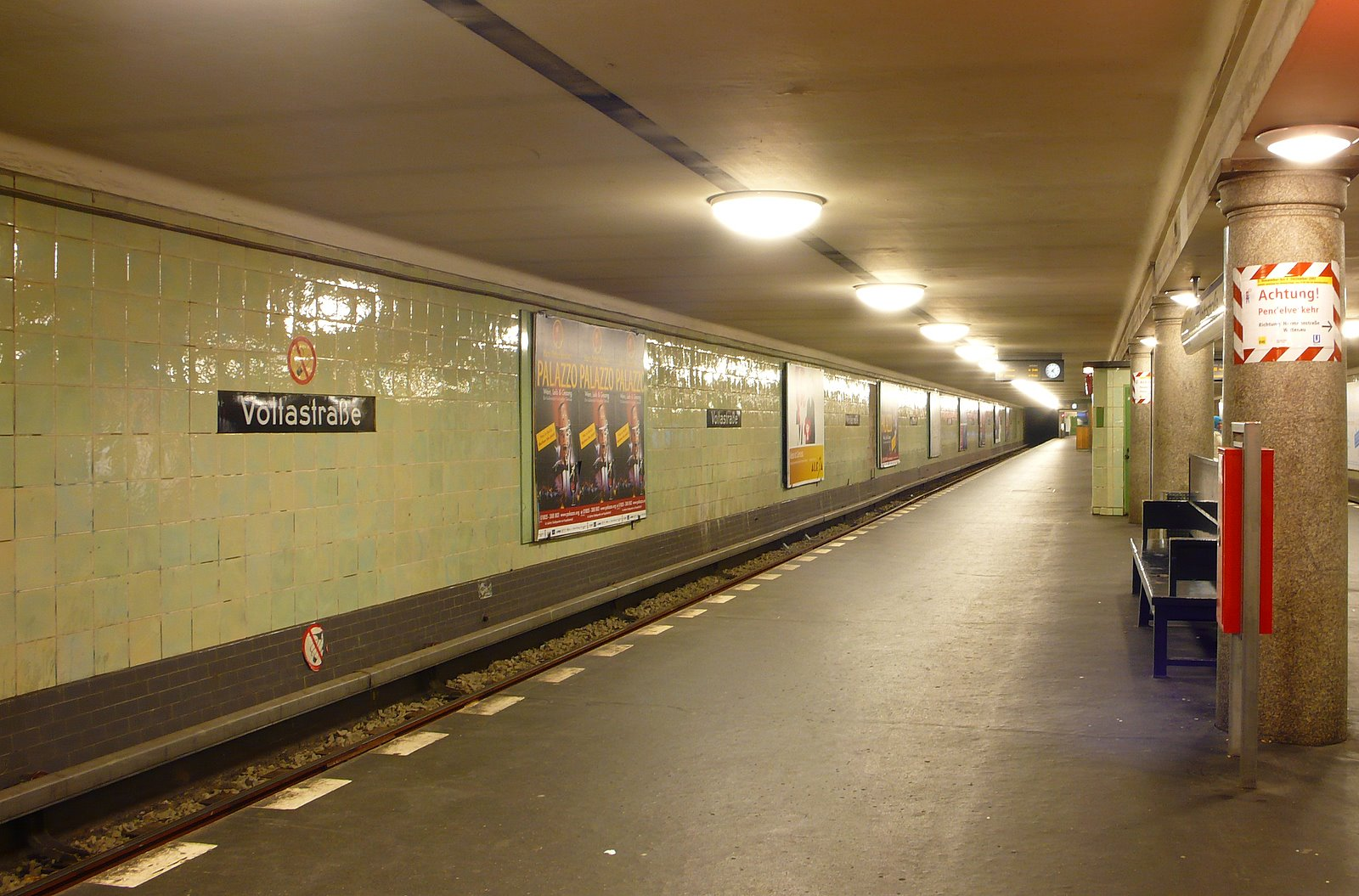
Platform view

Voltastraße is a Berlin U-Bahn station located on the U8. Built in 1914 but not opened until 1930 (a delay caused by the First World War), it has granite columns and is 4.5 metres (15 ft) below the street.

After the completion of the Berlin Wall, line U8 was severely curtailed. In the north, only Voltastraße and Gesundbrunnen stations could be used by West Berliners. Thereafter U8 became a tiny line of two stations that was little used, a condition that lasted until 5 October 1977 when it was extended to Osloer Straße to interchange with line U9.

Preceding station	Berlin U-Bahn	Following station
Gesundbrunnen towards Wittenau	U8	Bernauer Straße towards Hermannstraße
