= Berlin Hauptbahnhof =

Main railway station of Berlin, Germany

Berlin Hbf
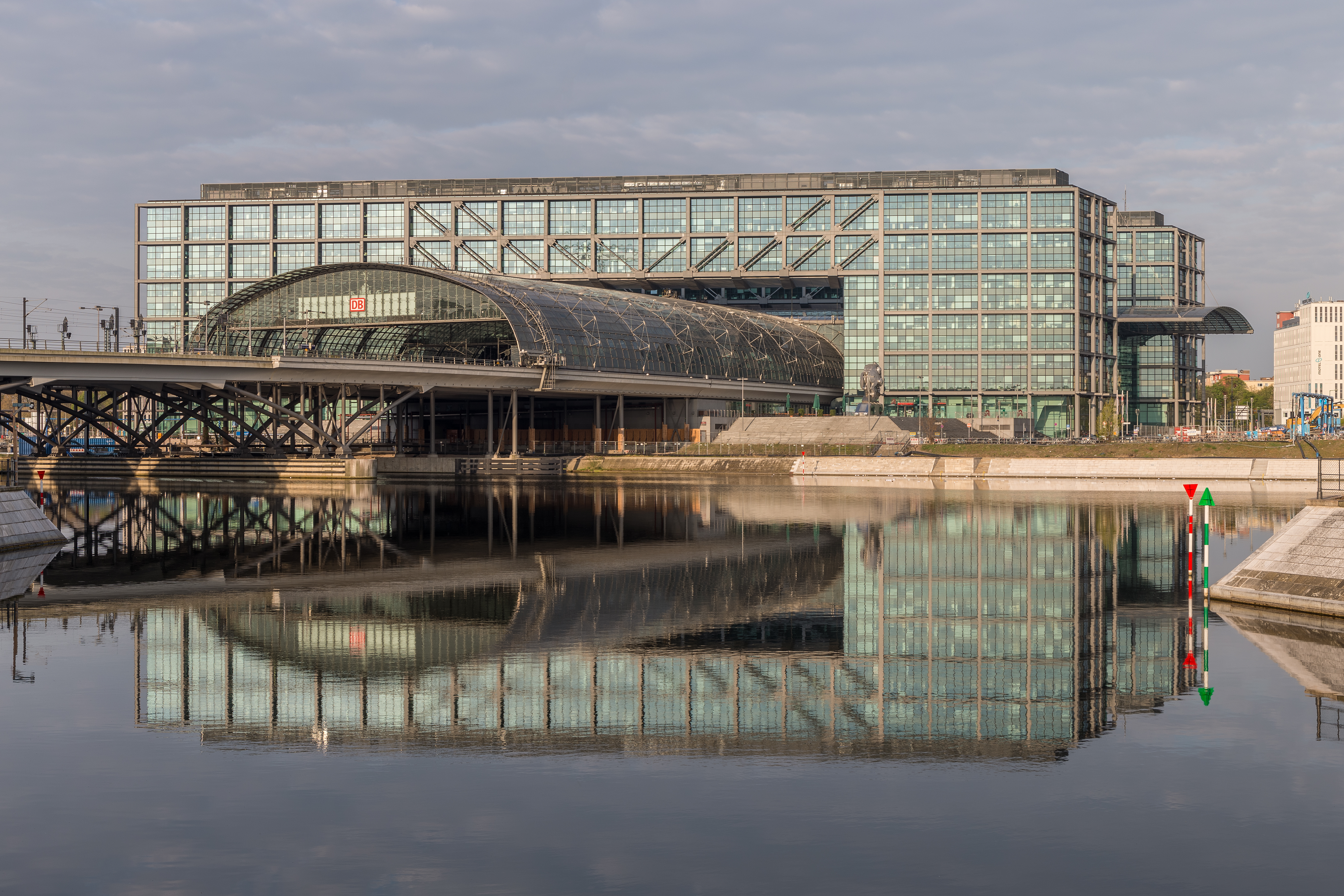
- East facade of Berlin Hauptbahnhof

General information
- Other names: Lehrter Bahnhof
- Location: Europaplatz 1; 10557 Berlin; Mitte, Berlin, Berlin; Germany
- Coordinates: 52°31′30″N 13°22′10″E
- Owner: DB InfraGO
- Lines: Stadtbahn; North–South mainline; U5
- Platforms: 3 island platforms (Stadtbahn); 4 island platforms (North–South mainline); 1 island platform (U-Bahn)
- Tracks: 6 (Stadtbahn); 8 (North–South mainline); 2 (U-Bahn)
- Train operators: DB Fernverkehr; DB Regio Nordost; FlixTrain; Ostdeutsche Eisenbahn; S-Bahn Berlin
- Connections: : M5, M8, M10; : 120, 123, 142, 147, 245, N5, N20, N40; : M41, M85

Construction
- Structure type: Elevated (Stadtbahn); Underground (North–South mainline, U-Bahn)
- Cycle facilities: Call a Bike
- Accessible: Yes
- Architect: Meinhard von Gerkan of Gerkan, Marg and Partners

Other information
- Station code: 1071
- DS100 code: BLS (main line, upper level), BL (main line, lower level), BHBF (S-Bahn)
- IBNR: 8011160
- Category: 1
- Fare zone: : Berlin A/5555
- Website: www.bahnhof.de

History
- Opened: 26 May 2006; 20 years ago

Passengers
- 300,000 per day
Services
Preceding station	DB Fernverkehr	Following station
Berlin-Spandau towards Frankfurt Airport Regional or Saarbrücken Hbf	ICE 3 Sprinter	Berlin Südkreuz Terminus
Berlin Gesundbrunnen Terminus	ICE 6 Sprinter	Berlin Südkreuz towards Stuttgart Hbf
Berlin-Spandau towards Bonn Hbf	ICE 9 Sprinter	Berlin Südkreuz Terminus
Berlin Zoologischer Garten towards Bonn Hbf	ICE 9 Sprinter	Berlin Ostbahnhof Terminus
Berlin Zoologischer Garten towards Köln Hbf	ICE 10	Berlin Ostbahnhof Terminus
Berlin Gesundbrunnen Terminus	ICE 11	Berlin Südkreuz towards München Hbf
Berlin Zoologischer Garten towards Brig, Chur or Interlaken Ost	ICE 12	Berlin Ostbahnhof Terminus
Berlin Zoologischer Garten towards Frankfurt Airport, Frankfurt (Main) Hbf, Karlsruhe Hbf or Stuttgart Hbf	ICE 13	Berlin Ostbahnhof Terminus
Berlin Zoologischer Garten towards Aachen Hbf	ICE 14	Berlin Ostbahnhof Terminus
Berlin Gesundbrunnen towards Ostseebad Binz	ICE 15	Berlin Südkreuz towards Saarbrücken Hbf
Berlin-Spandau towards Oldenburg Hbf	ICE 16	Berlin Südkreuz Terminus
Berlin Gesundbrunnen towards Rostock Hbf	IC 17	Berlin Südkreuz towards Dresden Hbf or Chemnitz Hbf
Berlin Gesundbrunnen Terminus	ICE 18	Berlin Südkreuz towards München Hbf
Berlin-Spandau towards Hamburg-Altona	ICE 18	Berlin Südkreuz towards München Hbf
Hamburg Hbf towards Westerland (Sylt)	ICE 18	Berlin Südkreuz Terminus
Berlin Zoologischer Garten towards Koblenz Hbf	ICE 19	Berlin Ostbahnhof Terminus
Berlin-Spandau towards Hamburg-Altona	RJ 27	Berlin Südkreuz towards Praha hl.n., Budapest Nyugati or Wien Hbf
Berlin-Spandau towards København H	RJ 27	Berlin Südkreuz towards Praha hl.n.
Berlin-Spandau towards Kiel Hbf	RJ 27	Berlin Südkreuz towards Praha hl.n.
Berlin-Spandau towards Hamburg-Altona or Kiel Hbf	ICE 28	Berlin Südkreuz towards München Hbf
Terminus	ICE 29 Sprinter	Berlin Südkreuz towards München Hbf
Berlin Zoologischer Garten towards Norddeich Mole	IC 56	Berlin Ostbahnhof towards Cottbus Hbf
Berlin-Spandau towards Amsterdam Centraal	ICE 77	Berlin Ostbahnhof Terminus
Berlin Südkreuz towards Wien Hbf	ICE 91	Berlin Gesundbrunnen Terminus
Terminus	EC 95	Berlin Ostbahnhof towards Warszawa Wschodnia or Gdynia Główna
Terminus	EC 96	Berlin Ostbahnhof towards Przemyśl Główny
Preceding station	European Sleeper	Following station
Deventer towards Brussels-South	Brussels–Prague	Berlin Ostbahnhof One-way operation
Preceding station		Following station
Terminus	FLX 10	Berlin Südkreuz towards Stuttgart Hbf
Berlin-Spandau towards Aachen Hbf	FLX 30	Berlin Südkreuz towards Dresden Hbf or Leipzig Hbf
Berlin-Spandau towards Hamburg Hbf	FLX 35	Berlin Südkreuz towards Leipzig Hbf
Preceding station	DB Regio Nordost	Following station
Terminus	Flughafen-Express	Berlin Potsdamer Platz towards BER Airport
Berlin Gesundbrunnen towards Stralsund Hbf or Schwedt	RE 3	Berlin Potsdamer Platz towards Jüterbog or Lutherstadt Wittenberg Hbf
Berlin Jungfernheide towards Rathenow or Stendal Hbf	RE 4	Berlin Potsdamer Platz towards Jüterbog or Falkenberg (Elster)
Berlin Gesundbrunnen towards Rostock Hbf or Stralsund Hbf	RE 5	Berlin Potsdamer Platz towards Berlin Südkreuz
Berlin Zoologischer Garten towards Dessau Hbf	RE 7	Berlin Friedrichstraße towards Senftenberg
Terminus	RE 20	Berlin Potsdamer Platz towards Lübbenau (Spreewald) or Cottbus Hbf
Berlin Zoologischer Garten towards Nauen	RB 14	Berlin Friedrichstraße towards Berlin Ostbahnhof
Berlin Zoologischer Garten towards Golm	RB 23	Berlin Friedrichstraße towards Berlin Ostbahnhof
Preceding station	Ostdeutsche Eisenbahn	Following station
Berlin Zoologischer Garten towards Brandenburg Hbf or Magdeburg Hbf	RE 1	Berlin Friedrichstraße towards Cottbus Hbf or Frankfurt (Oder)
Berlin Zoologischer Garten towards Nauen	RE 2	Berlin Friedrichstraße towards Cottbus Hbf
Berlin Jungfernheide towards Wismar	RE 8	Berlin Potsdamer Platz towards Elsterwerda
Preceding station	Abellio Rail Mitteldeutschland	Following station
Berlin Zoologischer Garten towards Thale Hbf or Goslar	Harz-Berlin-Express	Berlin Friedrichstraße towards Berlin Ostbahnhof
Preceding station	Berlin S-Bahn	Following station
Terminus	S15	Wedding towards Gesundbrunnen
Bellevue towards Spandau	S3	Friedrichstraße towards Erkner
Bellevue towards Westkreuz	S5	Friedrichstraße towards Strausberg Nord
Bellevue towards Potsdam Hbf	S7	Friedrichstraße towards Ahrensfelde
Bellevue towards Spandau	S9	Friedrichstraße towards BER Airport
Preceding station	Berlin U-Bahn	Following station
Terminus	U5	Bundestag towards Hönow
Location

Berlin Hauptbahnhof (English: Berlin Central Station) is the main railway station in Berlin, Germany. It came into full operation two days after a ceremonial opening on 26 May 2006. It is located on the site of the historic Lehrter Bahnhof, and on the Berlin S-Bahn suburban railway. The station is owned by DB InfraGO, a subsidiary of Deutsche Bahn AG, and is classified as a Category 1 station, one of 21 in Germany and four in Berlin, the others being Berlin Gesundbrunnen, Berlin Südkreuz and Berlin Ostbahnhof. It is open 24/7.

Lehrter Bahnhof (Lehrte Station) opened in 1871 as the terminus of the railway linking Berlin with Lehrte, near Hanover, which later became Germany's most important east–west main line. In 1882, with the completion of the Stadtbahn (City Railway, Berlin's four-track central elevated railway line, which carries both local and main line services), just north of the station, a smaller interchange station called Lehrter Stadtbahnhof was opened to provide connections with the new line. This station later became part of the Berlin S-Bahn. In 1884, after the closure of nearby Hamburger Bahnhof (Hamburg Station), Lehrter Bahnhof became the terminus for trains to and from Hamburg.

Following heavy damage during World War II, limited services to the main station were resumed, but then suspended in 1951. In 1957, with the railways to West Berlin under the control of East Germany, Lehrter Bahnhof was demolished, but Lehrter Stadtbahnhof remained as a stop on the S-Bahn. In 1987, it was extensively renovated to commemorate Berlin's 750th anniversary. After German reunification, it was decided to improve Berlin's railway network by constructing a new north–south main line, to supplement the east-west Stadtbahn. Lehrter Stadtbahnhof was considered to be the logical location for a new central station.

== Location ==
The station is located in the Moabit district, in the Mitte borough. To the north is Europaplatz and Invalidenstraße, and to the south is Washingtonplatz and the Spree. South of the station is the Spreebogenpark, the Bundeskanzleramt, and the Paul-Löbe-Haus. To the east is the Mitte district and the Humboldthafen.

== Function ==
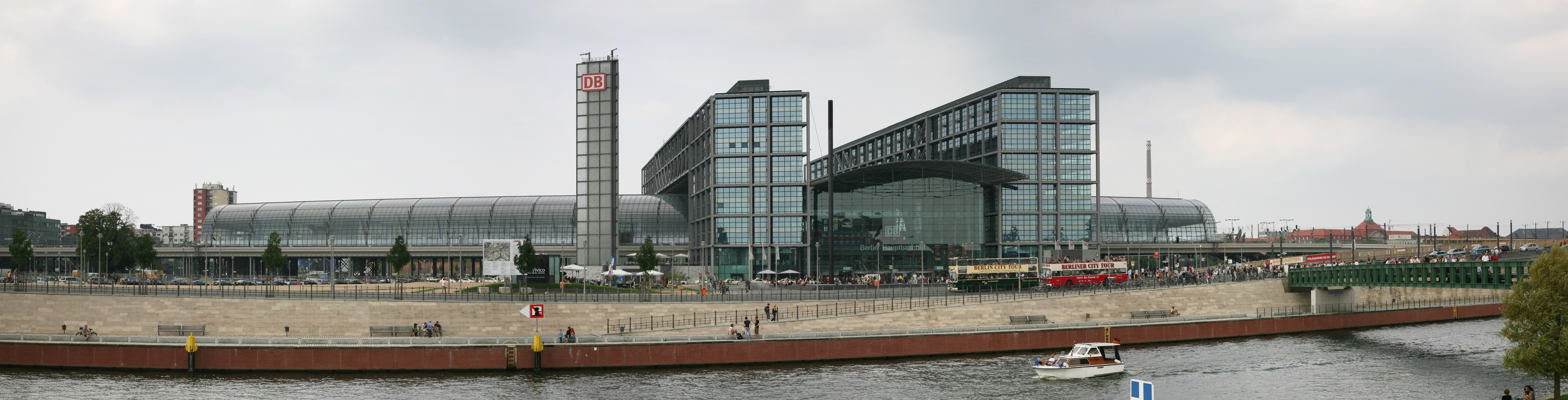
Panorama

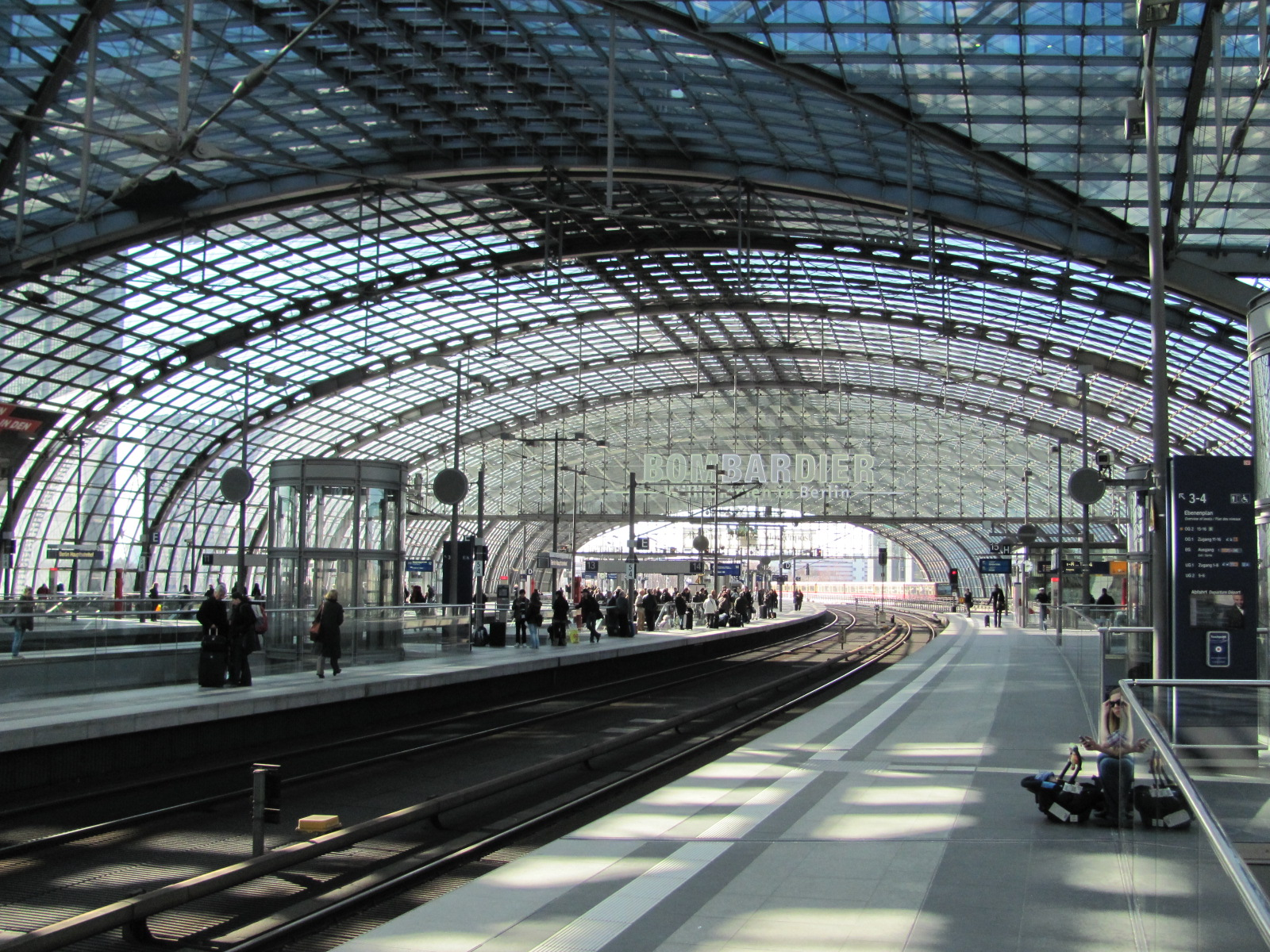
Elevated platforms

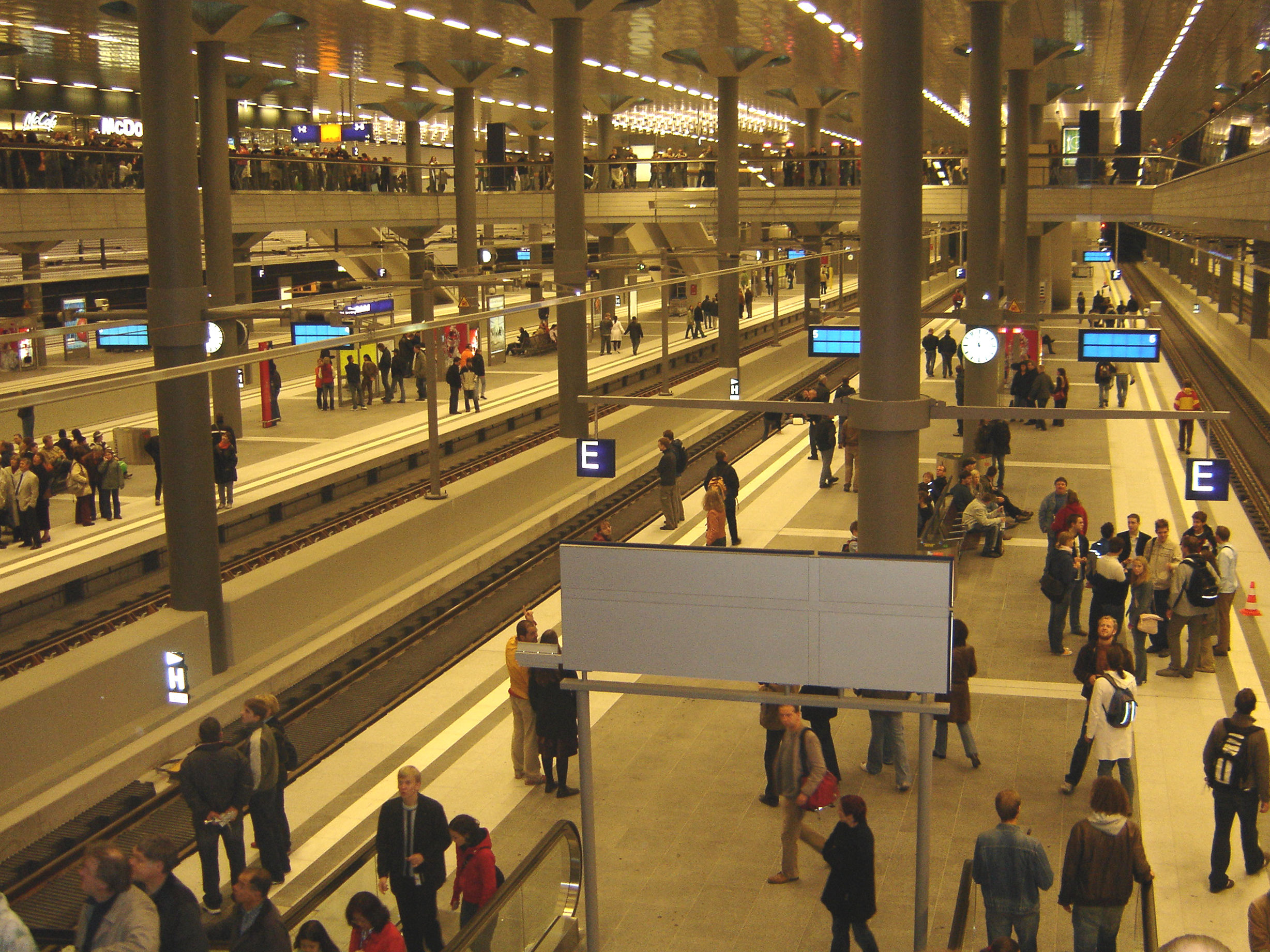
Underground platforms

Berlin Hauptbahnhof is part of the mushroom concept in Berlin, in which the station forms a connecting point for converging and intersecting lines of different modes of public transport.

The station's length is 430 metres (1,411 ft), though some of the platforms are 80 metres (260 ft) long.

Structurally, the entire station complex is a tower station, while operationally it is a crossing station similar to all central stations. The complex consists of several independent operating points:

- Tracks 1 to 8 are underground and are used for regional and intercity services on the Berlin North–South mainline.
- Tracks 9 and 10 are underground and are used for S15 S-Bahn line.
- Tracks 11 to 14 are elevated and are used for regional and intercity services on the Berlin Stadtbahn.
- Tracks 15 and 16 are elevated and are used for S-Bahn services on the Stadtbahn.
- Tracks U1 and U2 are separate from the main station and are used for U-Bahn line U5.

== Construction and techniques ==
=== Building ===
The station building has two platform levels and three connecting and business levels. Compared to Raffles Place MRT station and Taipei main station, it is one of the most densely packed stations. The upper platform level serves the Berlin Stadtbahn and consists of six elevated tracks on four bridge structures, served by three island platforms 10 metres (33 ft) high. The outer bridges carry one track each, while the inner bridges carry two each. The lower platform level serves the Berlin North–South mainline, and consists of eight underground tracks served by four island platforms 15 metres (49 ft 3 in) deep. To the east are two tracks and an island platform serving U-Bahn line U5 (formerly line U55). Further to the east, a similar double track platform is being built as part of the S21 project.

The bridges carrying the Stadtbahn are approximately 680 metres (2,231 ft) long, and span not only the station area, but also the adjacent Humboldthafen. Due to the way the Stadtbahn is aligned, they are curved, and due to the broadening from four to six tracks and the additional platforms, the total width has increased from 39 to 66 metres (128 to 217 ft) wide. The Humboldthafen Bridge spans the Humboldthafen with a span of 60 metres (197 ft). It consists of a bow with steel tubes and pre-stressed concrete beam as upper flange.

The upper platform hall, which runs east–west, is 321 metres (1,053 ft) long and consists of the arched, column-free, glass roof structure, which is supported by the two outer railway overpass structures. In the glass surface, a 2,700 square metres (29,000 sq ft) photovoltaic system with a capacity of 330 kilowatts was integrated. The hall is between 46 and 66 metres (151 and 217 ft) wide and a maximum of 16 metres (52 ft 6 in) high. It consists of three sections, with the western segment 172 metres (564 ft) and the eastern 107 metres (351 ft) long. In between lies the 50 metres (164 ft) wide and 180 metres (591 ft) long north–south roof, whose barrel vaults with the main roof form a flat viaduct. Parallel to the north–south roof, the two "ironing structures" span the main roof of the platform hall and carry the north–south roof. These ironing structures contain 42,000 square metres (450,000 sq ft) of office space.

On the northeastern part of the two diagonally opposite station terraces, the sculpture of Rolling Horse, erected in 2007 by Jürgen Goertz, artificially complements the building and is reminiscent to Lehrter Bahnhof and Lehrter Stadtbahnhof. There are integrated artificial elements, which can be viewed through four portholes.

From the southwestern terrace, it rises the disguised chimney located underneath the Tunnel Tiergarten Spreebogen.

During Cyclone Kyrill, on 18 January 2007, the 8.4-metre (27 ft 7 in) long, 1.35-tonne (2,976 lb) horizontal strut 40 metres (131 ft 3 in) high, crashed from the lattice-like exterior onto a staircase, onto the southwestern part of the building, another strut was torn from the anchorage. These decorative elements had only been hung up and should only hold their own weight. As a remedy, small sheets were placed above the carrier to prevent further carrier dissolution.

== History ==
=== Lehrter Bahnhof from 1871 to 1958 ===
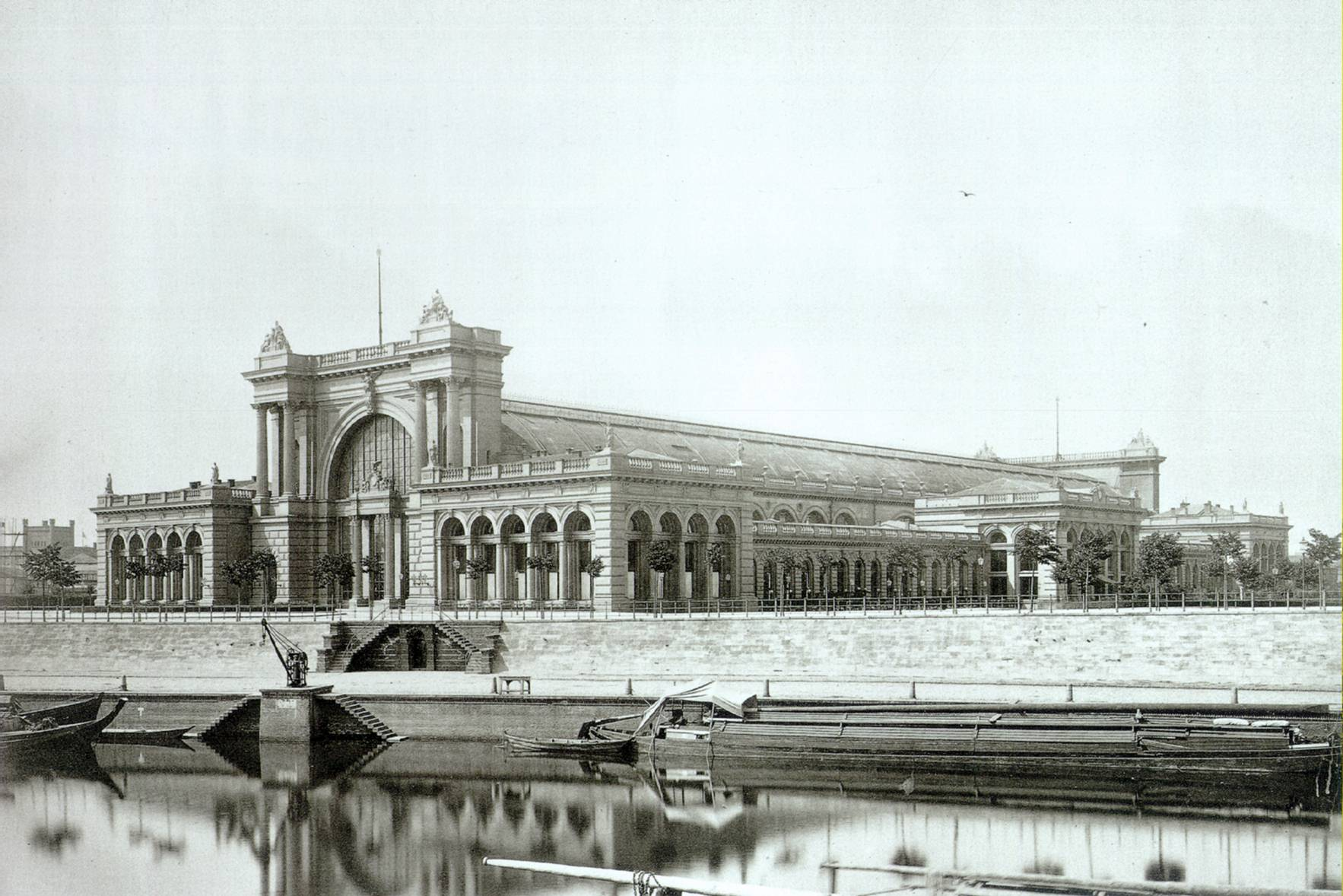
The station building seen from southeast in 1879

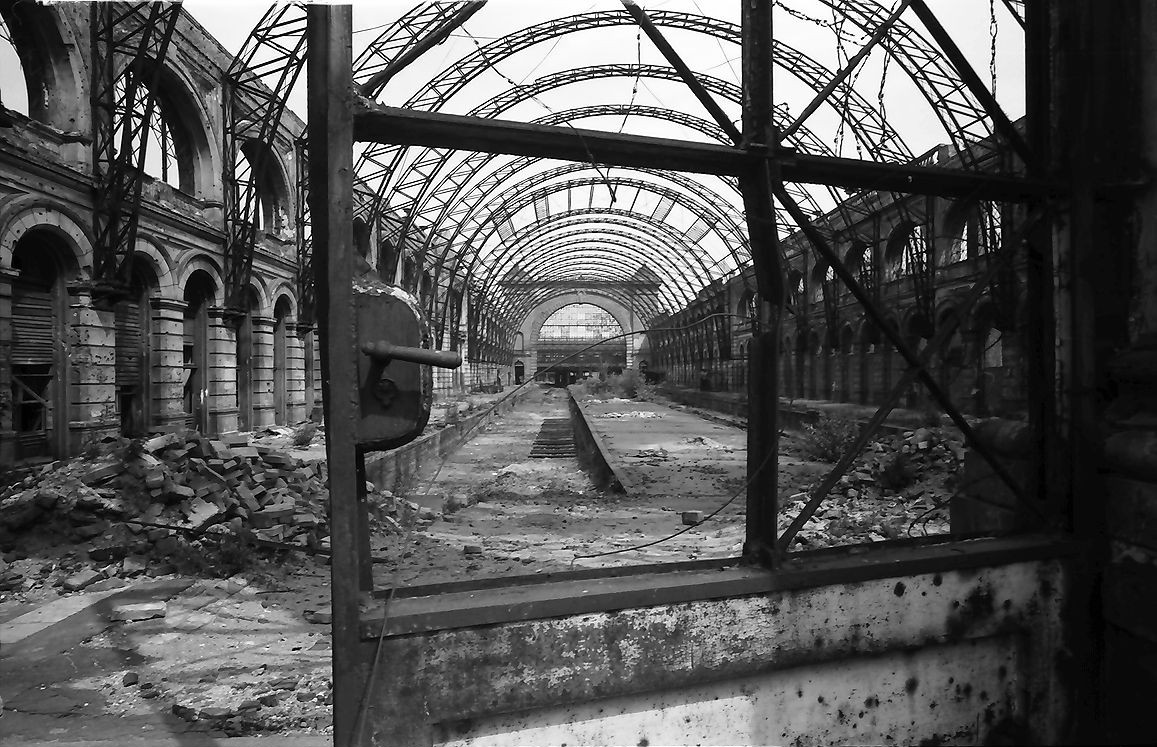
The ruined train hall of Lehrter Bahnhof in 1957

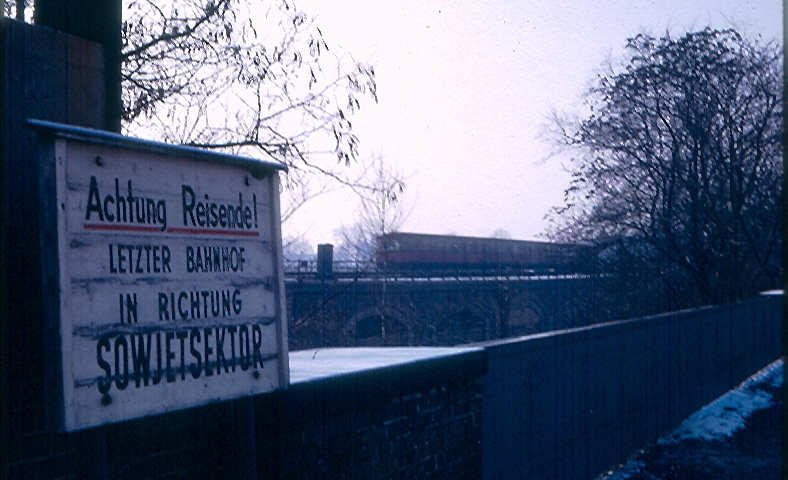
Attention passengers last stop in the direction of the Soviet sector

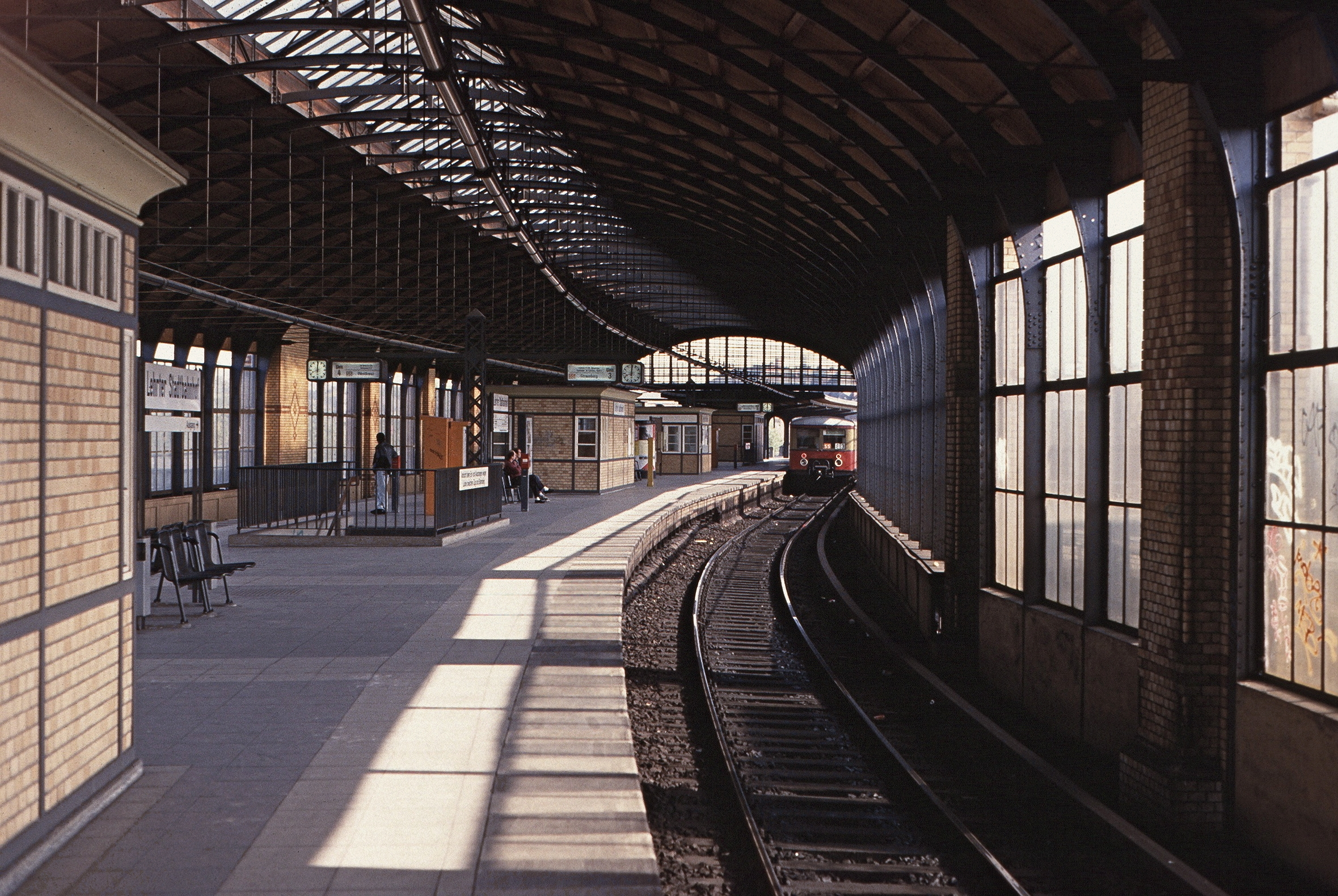
Lehrter Stadtbahnhof platform in 1992 after its 1987 renovation

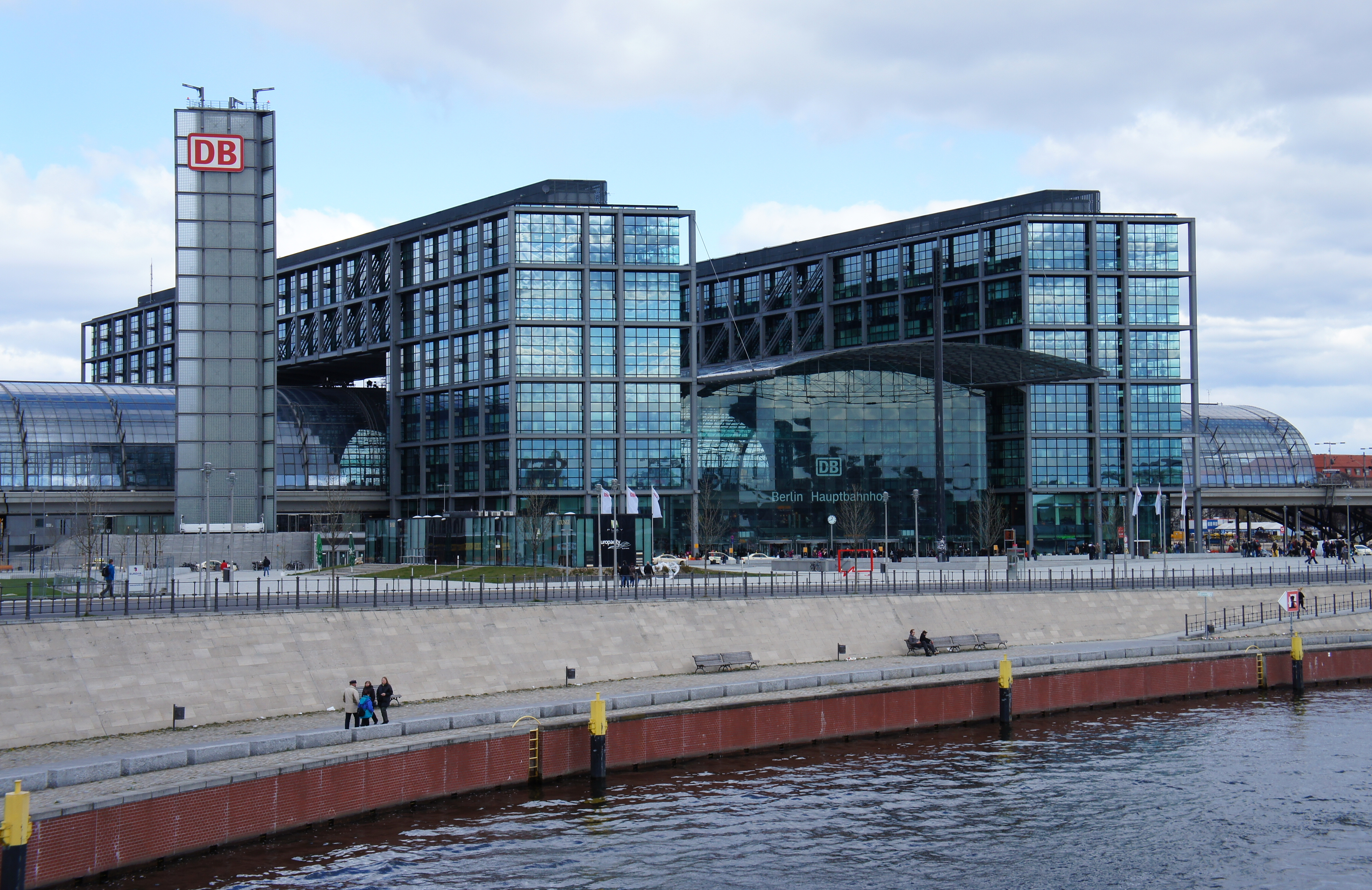
View of the station building and south plaza

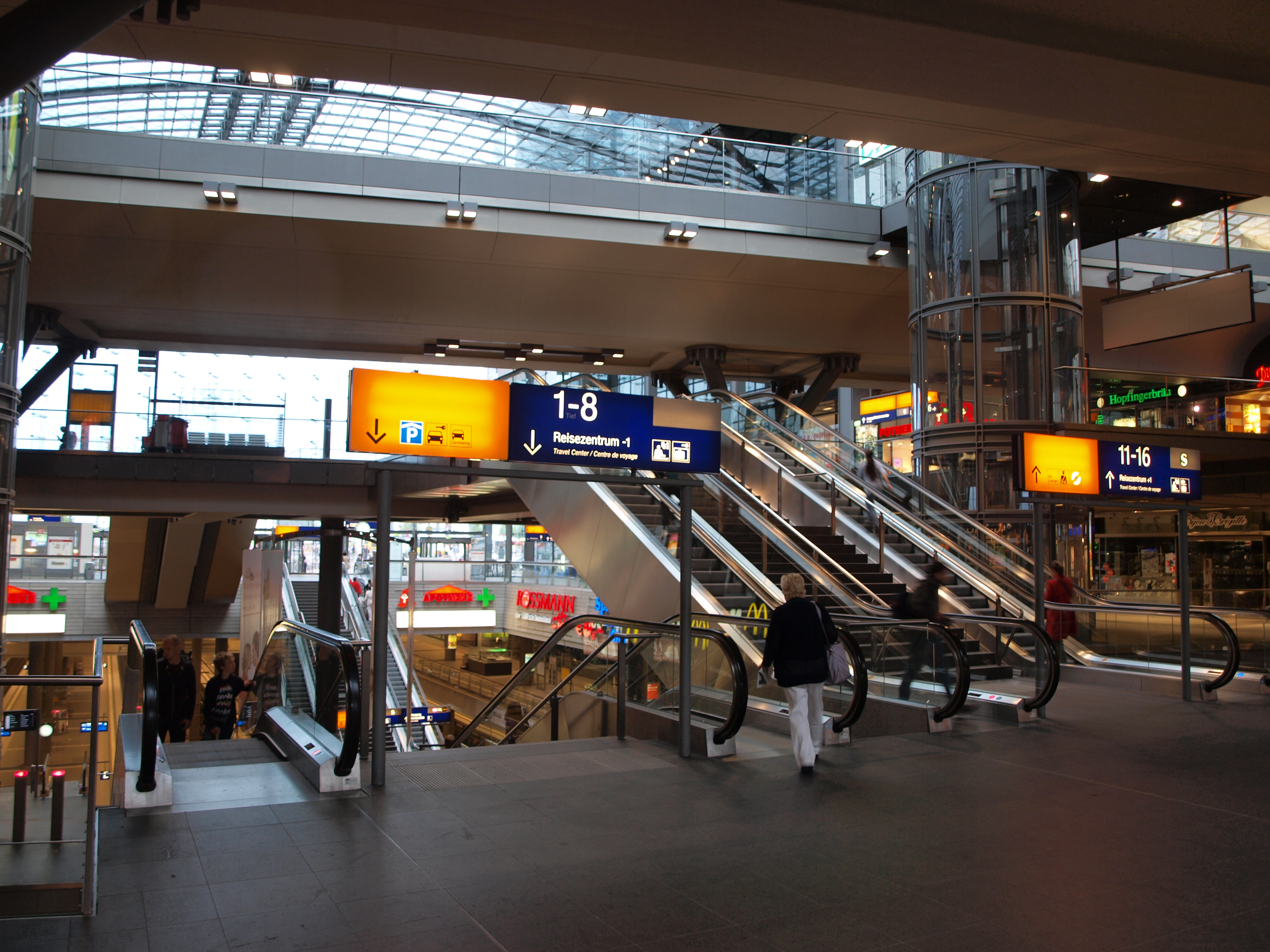
Berlin Hauptbahnhof has railway tracks on two levels, running perpendicular with each other. Shopping and other services are provided.

Between 1868 and 1871, a 239 kilometres (149 mi) railway was built between Hannover and Berlin via Lehrte by the Magdeburg Halberstädter railway company. Lehrter Bahnhof was constructed as the Berlin terminus. It was adjacent to Hamburger Bahnhof, just outside what was then Berlin's boundary at the Humbolthafen port on the river Spree. Its architects were Alfred Lent, Bertold Scholz, and Gottlieb Henri Lapierre.

In contrast to earlier railway stations, built with brick façades, and in keeping with then-current trends, Lehrter Bahnhof was designed in the French Neo-Renaissance style. Its originally planned stone façade was replaced with glazed tiles to save money. With its magnificent architecture, the station was known as a "palace among stations".

The train shed was 188 metres (617 ft) long and 38 metres (125 ft) wide. Its roof was a long barrel vault with steel supports. As was common for the period, the station was divided into an arrival side on the west, and a departure side on the east. Originally there were five tracks, four of which ended at the side and the central platform; the fifth track had no platform and served as a turnaround for the locomotives. At the turn of the century this track was removed to accommodate the widening of the central platform.

Although the front of the building was ornate and had a grand entrance, most passengers entered and left via the east side, where horse-drawn carriages were able to stop.

In 1882 the metropolitan railway, predecessor of the S-Bahn, began service along two of the Stadtbahn tracks; long-distance traffic commenced in 1884 along the other two. With the expansion of Lehrter Bahnhof, it was able to take over the functions of Hamburger Bahnhof. A 300 m (984 ft) connector line was built; on 14 October 1884, traffic towards Hamburg, northeast Germany, and Scandinavia was diverted to Lehrter Bahnhof, and Hamburger Bahnhof closed.

In 1886, the Berlin-Lehrte railway, and with it Lehrter Bahnhof, was nationalized and subsequently came under the control of the Prussian State Railways.

Even in its early years, the line was known as one of the country's fastest: in 1872, express trains could attain a speed of 90 km/h (56 mph). 19 December 1932 marked the maiden voyage of the famous diesel-powered Fliegender Hamburger (Flying Hamburger), which whisked passengers to Hamburg at 160 km/h (99 mph).

In the Second World War the station was severely damaged. After the war, the shell was repaired such that it could be used temporarily. During the late 1940s it became a frequent spot for Group of Soviet Occupation Forces in Germany soldiers to sexually assault passengers. However, the postwar division of Germany spelled the end for most of West Berlin's mainline stations. On 28 August 1951 the final train departed from Lehrter Bahnhof, heading for Wustermark and Nauen. On 9 July 1957 demolition began, and on 22 April 1958 the main entrance was blown up. The biggest challenge in the demolition of the station was to preserve the viaducts of the Stadtbahn, which ran directly overhead. Work was completed in the summer of 1959.

=== Lehrter Stadtbahnhof from 1882 to 2002 ===
On 15 May 1882, Lehrter Stadtbahnhof opened, situated on the Stadtbahn viaduct at the northern end of Lehrter Bahnhof's concourse. This four-track station on the Stadtbahn was used mainly by suburban trains. The main purpose of the Stadtbahn was to connect central areas of Berlin with the Lehrter Bahnhof, the Schlesischer Bahnhof termini with nearby Charlottenburg, then still a separate city. It also provided an east–west railway connection across the centre of Berlin.

Because of steadily increasing traffic to Lehrter Stadtbahnhof and its location on a bridge crossing the north end of Lehrter Bahnhof, elaborate changes were made to the track structure in 1912 and again in 1929. On 1 December 1930, the newly electrified suburban trains were given the designation S-Bahn, making the Lehrter Stadtbahnhof an S-Bahnhof.

During the War, in April 1943 the station was bombed by the Polish sabotage and diversionary squad "Zagra-lin".

The Stadtbahnhof survived WWII intact, but came to lose its pre-war significance due to the division of Berlin; with Lehrter Bahnhof closed, the Stadtbahnhof served only a relatively underpopulated area near the border with East Berlin. It was the final stop in West Berlin; the next station, Berlin Friedrichstraße, was in East Berlin, although it served as a stop on the West Berlin S- and U-Bahn systems; these parts of the station were sealed off and inaccessible to East Berliners. The S-Bahn, like the mainlines leading to West Berlin, was run by the East German railway, the Deutsche Reichsbahn. The 1961 construction of the Berlin Wall further isolated the station, and led to a boycott of the S-Bahn in West Berlin that lasted until the 1980s, when operation of the West Berlin S-Bahn lines was transferred to the West Berlin transit authority, the BVG.

Berlin's 750th-anniversary celebration in 1987 saw the station, now under West Berlin control, renovated at a cost of about DM 10 million. Because it had largely been preserved in its original condition, it became a listed building.

However, in 2002, Lehrter Stadtbahnhof was demolished to make way for the new central station, despite its listed status. The argument was that Bellevue and Hackescher Markt stations were architecturally similar. Hackescher Markt, in the former East Berlin, had been restored in 1994–1996, after German reunification.

=== Planning the new station ===
Soon after the fall of the Berlin Wall in 1989, city planners began work on a transport plan for reunified Berlin. One element of this became the "Pilzkonzept" (mushroom concept), in which a new north–south railway line intersecting the Stadtbahn was to be constructed. The name derived from the shape formed by the new line and existing lines, which vaguely resembles a mushroom.

In June 1992 the federal government decided that the new station should be built on the site of Lehrter Bahnhof. While close to the centre of Berlin and government buildings, the area was still not heavily populated. The following year, a design competition for the project was held, which was won by the Hamburg architecture firm Gerkan, Marg and Partners.

The design called for five levels. The highest level, on a bridge 10 metres (33 ft) above street level, was to have platforms for both long-distance and S-Bahn trains on the existing Stadbahn. The lowest level, 15 metres (49 ft) underground, was to have platforms served by new tunnels to Potsdamer Platz under the Spree and the Tiergarten, forming a new north–south line running to the northern part of the S-Bahn ring around central Berlin. Platforms for the planned extension to U-Bahn line 5 were also included.

The planning approval for the station and the north–south connection was made on 12 September 1995. In 1997, a financing agreement was signed between Perleberger Straße and Spreebogen, between the federal government and the railway in the total amount of €700 million. The federal share amounted to €500 million. Any additional cost increases were supposed to be broken down according to a defined key.

New York-based Tishman Speyer Properties was commissioned by Bahn AG to develop the station. Execution planning and construction supervision were carried out by the Stuttgart engineering consultants Schlaich, Bergermann and Partner.

The Hauptbahnhof was planned to have platforms for the cancelled Transrapid maglev train at track 8. Later on, it was replaced by normal railway tracks.

=== Building the new station ===
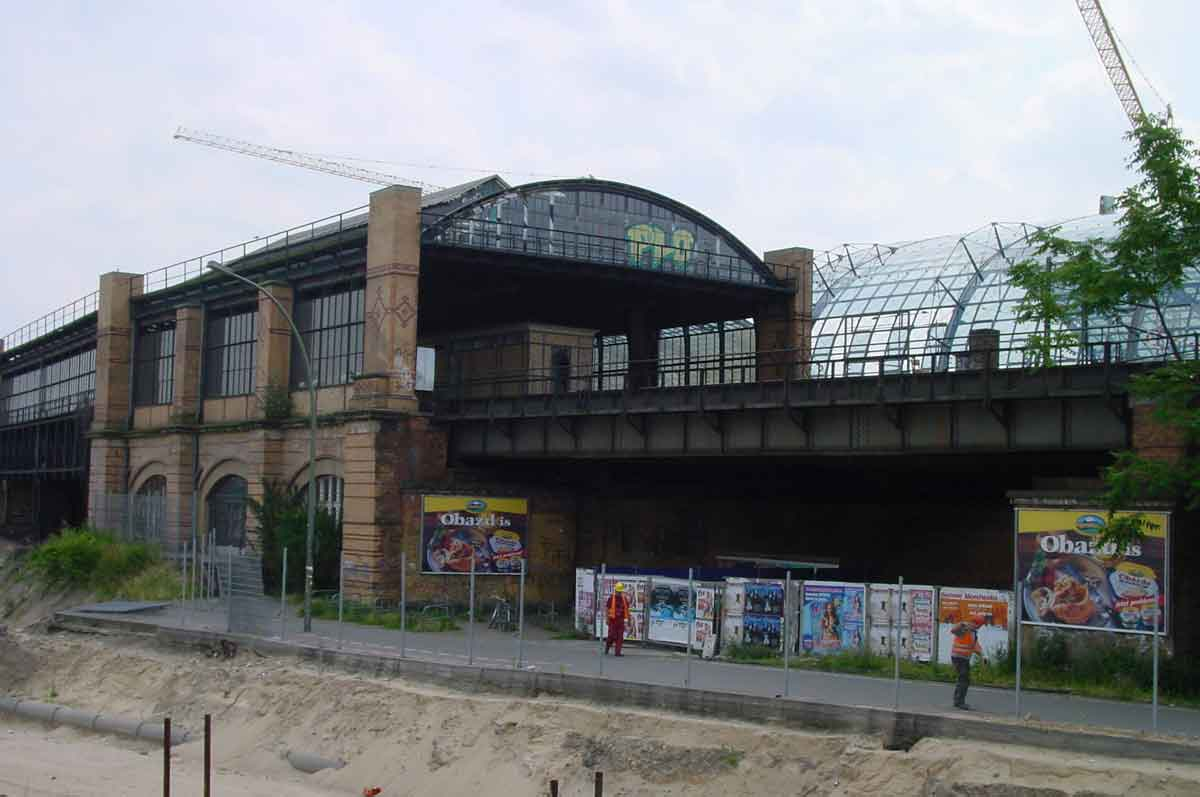
The Lehrter S-Bahn station in 2002, with the newer central station’s barrel vault under construction in the background

The building work took place in several stages. In 1995 the construction of the Tiergarten tunnels began, and this work was finished in 2005 with the completion of the last station tunnel. The tunnels provide four tubes for long-distance and regional services and two tubes in a separate alignment for the U-Bahn, in addition to a road tunnel ventilated by a 60 m (197 ft)-high tower completed in 2004. During its construction, the course of the Spree had to be diverted (1996–1998). Water leaks in the tunnels caused over one year's delay to the construction work.

In 1998, the construction of the station proper began. About 1,500,000 cubic metres (53,000,000 cu ft) of material were excavated for the pits, which are 90,000 m^{2} (970,000 sq ft) in total and about 20 metres (65 ft 7 in) deep. In their place, 227,000 m^{3} (8,000,000 cu ft) of concrete and 13,000 tons of steel reinforcement were installed. With 27-metre (89 ft)-long buoyancy anchors (a total of 250 kilometres (160 mi)) and 180 kilometres (110 mi) of inclined anchors, the foundation was anchored against the buoyant pressure of groundwater (200 kilonewtons per square meter).

On 9 September 1998, the foundation stone was laid symbolically by Federal Minister of Transport Wissmann, railway director Ludewig and Berlin's governing mayor Eberhard Diepgen in the then 17-metre (56 ft)-deep excavation pit. The commissioning date was in 2003. Construction costs were estimated at 800 million DM (€409 million). Over 50 million long-distance passengers and 86 million regional passengers were projected to use the station each year.

After groundwater had penetrated into the excavation pit as a result of a leak, the completion date was postponed in the spring of 1999. The incident necessitated a far-reaching change in the safety concept during the construction phase, in order to keep the groundwater lying about 3 metres (9 ft 10 in) below the ground. Under the new schedule, the station's shell should have been finished in 2003, and trial operations should have begun in 2004. In the middle of 2001, commissioning for 2006 was expected.

Construction of the bridges for the new S-Bahn route began in 2001. These needed to span not only the entire length of the station, but also the adjacent Humboldthafen port, and are 450 m (1,480 ft) long. Because of the alignment of the S-Bahn they are curved, and each pair of tracks has a separate bridge. Bridges of this type had never been built before, and represented a special challenge for the Egyptian engineer Hani Azer, the chief construction engineer since 2001.

The main station hall is spanned by a similarly curved glass roof with a surface area of about 85 m (279 ft) by 120 m (390 ft), which was installed in February 2002. A photovoltaic system was integrated into the glass surface. The steel and glass construction was a difficult task for the engineers, particularly as the glass roofs were shortened by approximately 100 metres (330 ft) to speed up construction.

Over the first weekend of July 2002 the bridges and main station hall were brought into service so that traffic could be diverted onto the new alignment. The old Lehrter Stadtbahnhof S-Bahn station was closed and rapidly demolished to make way for further construction. On 9 September 2002 the station was renamed "Berlin Hauptbahnhof – Lehrter Bahnhof".

The main concourse, supported by two towers, provides roughly 44,000 m^{2} (470,000 sq ft) of commercial space. Construction of the towers began in 2005. On two separate weekends, 29 July and 13 August 2005, structural frames were installed, supporting the structure above the east–west tracks. This was built using a new technique: the frames, each weighing 1,250 t (2,755,778 lb), were lowered by steel cables at a rate of 6 m (19 ft 8 in) per hour; the remaining 20 mm (0.79 in) gap between the bow frames upon completion of the lowering process was subsequently closed.

During summer 2003 a survey commissioned by Peter Strieder, Berlin's Senator for City Development and Traffic, and Deutsche Bahn director Hartmut Mehdorn was conducted among Berlin residents with the intention of selecting a name for the station. Of the three possibilities listed on the survey, the majority of participants opted for Lehrter Bahnhof; nevertheless, the station remained "Berlin Hauptbahnhof – Lehrter Bahnhof", an option that was not listed. It was decided early in 2005 that the station would be renamed "Berlin Hauptbahnhof" on the date of its opening, 28 May 2006, to avoid confusing rail passengers. On the same day, Berlin Papestraße station, which was rebuilt as the city's second-largest station, opened officially under its new name, Berlin Südkreuz (South Cross), similar to the existing Ostkreuz and Westkreuz stations. It is also on the new north–south route. Although it was intended to open a further station as Berlin-Nordkreuz (North Cross), the name Berlin-Gesundbrunnen was retained for what became Berlin's fourth biggest railway station for commuter and long-distance trains, located in a more northern part of Berlin, where the circle and north–south-line of the S-Bahn cross each other.

In 2005 the bridging segments, which cross over the roof of the station, were lowered. This was the first time this unique method to build later office rooms was applied.

The architect Meinhard von Gerkan filed a complaint against Deutsche Bahn in October 2005 after Deutsche Bahn altered the station construction timeline without proper approval. The complaint was upheld in late 2006. There may therefore be further construction on the station in the future.

In addition, Deutsche Bahn decided to implement a slightly different version of the "Pilzkonzept" by running intercity trains through the new Tiergarten tunnels rather than via the Stadtbahn. This move was unpopular for its effect on Berlin's two previous main stations; Bahnhof Berlin Zoologischer Garten (Zoo Station) was downgraded to a regional railway station, and the number of mainline services to Berlin Ostbahnhof (East Station) was drastically reduced.

=== Opening ceremony ===
On 26 May 2006, the station was ceremonially opened by Chancellor Angela Merkel, who arrived together with transport minister Wolfgang Tiefensee in a specially chartered Intercity Express from Leipzig. A "Symphony of Light" was performed immediately following the dedication. Reamonn and BAP performed at the station, and there were also events at the other new stations: Gesundbrunnen, Potsdamer Platz and Südkreuz. Berlin Hauptbahnhof officially went into operation on 28 May 2006.

The opening ceremony was marred by an attack by a drunken 16-year-old wielding a knife, who stabbed members of the public leaving the ceremony. Forty-one people were wounded, six seriously, before the youth was arrested. According to police, the youth said he could not remember his act of violence and denied it. One of the first stabbing victims was HIV-positive, leading to worries that other victims may have been infected, although this did not prove to be the case. The youth was charged with attempted murder, and was sentenced to seven years in prison for attempted manslaughter in 33 cases in 2007.

=== Since opening ===
On 18 January 2007, two steel beams of the south-west façade were torn loose during European windstorm Kyrill. One of them, an 8.4-metre (27 ft 7 in)-long beam weighing 1.35-tonne (2,976 lb), dropped 40 metres (130 ft) onto a staircase below, and the other impacted and damaged a third beam. The station had suffered some flooding and had been evacuated due to the complete cancellation of train service in Germany. Consequently, nobody was injured and the station was cleared for reopening the following day. The beams had not been welded or bolted in place but laid down like shelves in a bookcase. In the next days extra lugs were welded to the remaining beams to secure them in place and the station declared stormproof on 23 January.

The Berlin U-Bahn line U55 opened in August 2009, connecting Hauptbahnhof with the Brandenburger Tor station. In December 2020 the line was extended to Alexanderplatz and it became part of line U5.

The airport express line was connected to the new Berlin Brandenburg Airport in 2020. It has a travel time of 22 minutes.

The rail bridge construction leading into the upper level of the station forms a curve, and some of the screws holding it in place have loosened. This required a €25 million reconstruction which involved the closure of the upper level rail tracks during a 3-month period in summer 2015.

In 2022, the train station became a key gateway for tens of thousands of refugees fleeing Ukraine and entering Germany. The station's basement became a makeshift processing point where refugees received supplies and directed to temporary accommodation or their next destination.

== Operational usage ==
The upper level of the station has six tracks (two of which are used for the Berlin S-Bahn) served by three island platforms. The lower level has eight tracks served by four island platforms for main-line trains, plus a further island platform for the Berlin U-Bahn. The lower level is often denoted by 'tief' on travel guides, etc. (thus the calling point may be "Berlin Hbf (tief)"). There is no rail connection between the upper and lower level track in the station area (or anywhere else nearby). 1,800 trains call at the station per day and the daily number of passengers is estimated to be at 350,000.

The upper part of the station, with the east–west tracks, is part of the Berlin Stadtbahn, with trains leading to locations including Hanover and Cologne. The subterranean station, which lies in the north-south Tiergarten tunnel, offers long-distance services to Hamburg, Leipzig or Munich.

=== U-Bahn ===
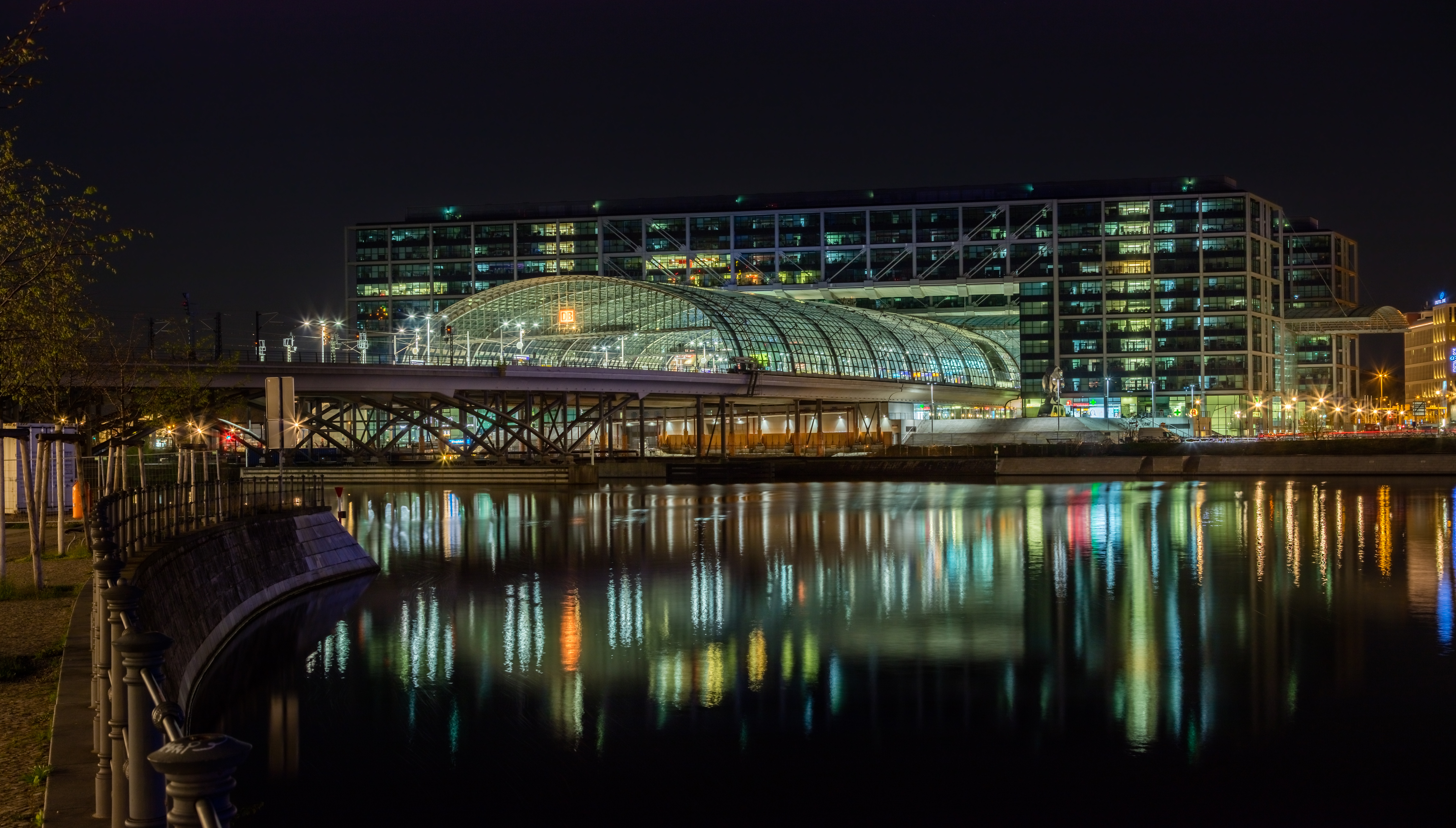
Night view of the Berlin Hauptbahnhof

The U-Bahn tracks are served by the U5, running from Hauptbahnhof to Hönow via Alexanderplatz. It was opened on 8 August 2009 as line U55, a shuttle to Brandenburger Tor via Bundestag, the only intermediate station. This line was operated as a single-track shuttle, and only one of the two platform tracks was used, the other being behind a metal fence, mounted in the ground. Construction of a 2.2 km (1.4 mi) connection to line U5 commenced in April 2010 and opened to the public on 4 December 2020. In the long term it is planned to extend the U5 from the main station towards the west to Turmstraße and Jungfernheide. Due to lack of funds from the state of Berlin, the northwestern continuation is not expected in the near future.

The underground station is in the second level of the main station, and east of the deep north–south train platforms (tracks 1–8). It has a central platform, which is covered with granite. To exit the platform are three stairs, an escalator and a lift. In addition, the station is equipped with tactile paving for accessibility.

The platform hall has a length of 140 metres (460 ft), 11 metres (36 ft 1 in), in height and 19 metres (62 ft 4 in) in width. The wall cladding consists of enamel plates which are decorated with photographs of the former Berlin head stations. Furthermore, colored lighting illuminates the ceiling space above the platform.

Since it is the terminus of the U5, a short two-pronged branch railway was built to the north. One of the two sweeping tracks is located at a lockable manhole, through which the U-Bahn carriages can be replaced if necessary with a crane.

Zoning for the underground line U11 under the Invalidenstraße is provided for at the station, but construction of this line has not yet commenced.

=== Trams ===
In 2009, the approval process was started to build a tram track connecting Hauptbahnhof to the existing tram network. After some legal hurdles by residents, construction started in the spring of 2011. On 14 December 2014, line M5 was extended from S Hackescher Markt to Hauptbahnhof.

On 29 August 2015, lines M8 and M10 were also extended from S Nordbahnhof to Hauptbahnhof.

In May 2023, the extension of the M10 line to Turmstraße U-Bahn station in the Moabit suburb, which had been planned since 2015 and has been under construction since 2021, was opened. It significantly improved the connection between the main railway station and the surrounding areas.

== Train services ==
In the 2026 timetable the following lines stop at the station:

=== Long distance ===
Line	Route			Level	Interval
ICE 3	Saarbrücken – Kaiserslautern – Mannheim –	Frankfurt – Berlin-Spandau – Berlin – Berlin Südkreuz		Low	Every 4 hours
ICE 3	Frankfurt Airport Regional –	Frankfurt – Berlin-Spandau – Berlin – Berlin Südkreuz		Low	Every 4 hours
ICE 6	Berlin-Gesundbrunnen – Berlin – Berlin Südkreuz – Nürnberg – Stuttgart			Low	Once a day
ICE 9	Bonn – Cologne – Berlin-Spandau – Berlin –		Berlin Südkreuz	Low	Every 6 hours
ICE 9	Bonn – Cologne – Berlin-Spandau – Berlin –		Berlin Ostbahnhof	High	Every 6 hours
ICE 10	Cologne –	Düsseldorf – Duisburg – Essen – Bochum – Dortmund –	Hamm – Bielefeld – Hanover – Wolfsburg – Berlin-Spandau – Berlin – Berlin Ostbahnhof	High	Hourly
ICE 10	Cologne –	Wuppertal – Hagen –	Hamm – Bielefeld – Hanover – Wolfsburg – Berlin-Spandau – Berlin – Berlin Ostbahnhof	High	Hourly
ICE 11	Berlin Gesundbrunnen – Berlin Hbf – Leipzig – Erfurt – Fulda – Frankfurt – Mannheim – Stuttgart – Augsburg – Munich			Low	Every 2 hours
ICE 12	Switzerland – Basel – Freiburg – Karlsruhe – Mannheim – Frankfurt – Kassel – Braunschweig – Wolfsburg – Berlin – Berlin Ostbahnhof			High	Every 2 hours
ICE 13	Stuttgart –	Heidelberg – Darmstadt –	Frankfurt South – Kassel – Braunschweig – Wolfsburg – Berlin Hbf – Berlin Ostbahnhof	High	Every 2 hours
ICE 13	Karlsruhe –	Heidelberg – Darmstadt –	Frankfurt South – Kassel – Braunschweig – Wolfsburg – Berlin Hbf – Berlin Ostbahnhof	High	Every 2 hours
ICE 13	Frankfurt Airport –		Frankfurt South – Kassel – Braunschweig – Wolfsburg – Berlin Hbf – Berlin Ostbahnhof	High	Every 2 hours
ICE 14	Aachen – Cologne – Düsseldorf – Essen –	Bochum – Dortmund – Hamm – Bielefeld –	Hanover – Berlin Hbf – Berlin Ostbahnhof	High	Every 2 hours
ICE 14	Aachen – Cologne – Düsseldorf – Essen –	Münster – Osnabrück –	Hanover – Berlin Hbf – Berlin Ostbahnhof	High	Every 2 hours
ICE 15	Binz – Stralsund – Berlin – Halle – Erfurt – Frankfurt – Darmstadt – Mannheim – Kaiserslautern – Saarbrücken			Low	Every two hours
ICE 16	Oldenburg – Bremen – Hanover – Berlin – Berlin Südkreuz			Low	Every four hours
IC 17	Rostock – Waren – Neustrelitz – Oranienburg – Berlin Gesundbrunnen – Berlin Hbf – Berlin Südkreuz – BER Airport – Elsterwerda – Dresden (– Chemnitz)			Low	Every two hours
ICE 18	Westerland – Hamburg – Berlin – Halle – Erfurt – Nuremberg – Augsburg – Munich			Low	Every two hours
ICE 19	Berlin Ostbahnhof – Berlin Hbf – Hanover – Bielefeld – Hamm – Hagen – Wuppertal – Köln (– Bonn – Koblenz – Stuttgart)			High	Every two hours
RJ 27	Hamburg-Altona/Copenhagen/Kiel – Hamburg – Berlin – Dresden – Prague (– Brno – Budapest/Vienna)			Low	Every 2 hours
ICE 28	Ostseebad Binz – Stralsund –	Berlin – Leipzig – Erfurt – Bamberg – Nuremberg – (Ingolstadt –) Augsburg – Munich		Low	1 train pair
ICE 28	Hamburg-Altona –	Berlin – Leipzig – Erfurt – Bamberg – Nuremberg – (Ingolstadt –) Augsburg – Munich		Low	Every 2 hours
ICE 29	Berlin Hbf – Halle – Erfurt – Nuremberg – Munich			Low	Hourly
IC 56	Norddeich Mole / Emden Außenhafen – Oldenburg – Bremen – Magdeburg – Berlin – Cottbus			High	1 train pair
ICE 77	Berlin Ostbahnhof – Berlin Hbf – Stendal – Hanover – Osnabrück – Rheine – Amersfoort – Amsterdam			High	Every 2 hours
ICE 91	Berlin Gesundbrunnen – Berlin Hbf – Halle – Erfurt – Nuremberg – Passau – Linz – Vienna			Low	Every 2 hours
EC 95	Berlin-Warszawa-Express (PKP: EIC ): Berlin Hbf – Berlin Ostbahnhof – Frankfurt – Poznań – Warsaw; Gedania (PKP: IC ): Berlin Hbf – Berlin Ostbahnhof – Frankfurt – Poznań – Gdynia; Wawel (PKP: IC ): Berlin Hbf – Berlin Ostbahnhof – Frankfurt – Wrocław – Katowice – Kraków – Rzeszów – Przemyśl			High	4 train pairs daily (Warsaw); 1 train pair daily (Gdynia); 1 train pair daily (Przemyśl)
NJ	ÖBB Nightjet; Berlin-Charlottenburg – Berlin Hbf – Berlin Ostbahnhof – Frankfurt – Wrocław – Ostrava – Vienna			High	1 train pair daily
NJ	ÖBB Nightjet; Hamburg-Altona – Berlin – Halle – Frankfurt South – Karlsruhe – Freiburg – Basel – Zürich			High	1 train pair daily
300/301	Snälltåget; Berlin Hbf – Hamburg – Copenhagen – Malmö – Stockholm			High	1 train daily (seasonal)
EN 345/346	SJ EuroNight; Berlin Hbf – Hamburg – Copenhagen – Malmö – Stockholm			High	1 train daily
EN	Moscow – Berlin – Paris; Moscow – Vyazma – Smolensk – Orsha – Minsk – Baranavichy – Brest – Terespol – Warsaw – Poznań – Rzepin – Frankfurt – Berlin-Lichtenberg – Berlin Hbf – Erfurt – Frankfurt South – Karlsruhe – Strasbourg – Paris Est			High	Mon, Sat (discontinued as of 1 February 2021)
ES	European Sleeper; Brussels – Rotterdam – Amsterdam – Amersfoort – Bad Bentheim – Berlin Hbf – Dresden – Bad Schandau – Prague			1 train pair thrice a week	
FLX 10	Berlin Hbf – Berlin Südkreuz – Halle (Saale) – Erfurt – Gotha – Eisenach – Fulda – Frankfurt South – Darmstadt – Weinheim – Heidelberg – Stuttgart			Low	1–2 train pairs daily
FLX 30	Berlin Südkreuz – Berlin Hbf – Berlin-Spandau – Hanover – Bielefeld – Dortmund – Essen – Duisburg – Düsseldorf – Cologne			Low	1–2 train pairs daily
FLX 35	Hamburg – Berlin Hbf – Leipzig			Low	up to 3 train pairs daily

=== Regional services ===
Line	Route		Level	Interval in the peak
HBX	Harz-Berlin-Express; Berlin Ostbahnhof – Berlin Hbf – Potsdamer Platz – Magdeburg – Halberstadt (train split) – Quedlinburg – Thale / Wernigerode – Goslar		high	2 train pairs
FEX	Airport Express; Berlin Hbf – Potsdamer Platz – Berlin Südkreuz – BER Airport		low	15 min
FEX	Charlottenburg – Berlin Hbf – Berlin Alexanderplatz – Berlin Ostbahnhof – Berlin Ostkreuz - BER Airport		high	Some nighttime services
RE 1	Magdeburg – Brandenburg – Potsdam – Berlin Hbf – Erkner – Fürstenwalde (Spree) – Frankfurt (Oder) (– Cottbus)		high	20 min
RE 2	Nauen – Berlin-Spandau – Berlin Hbf – Berlin Ostkreuz – Königs Wusterhausen – Lübbenau (Spreewald) – Vetschau – Cottbus		high	60 min
RE 3	Lutherstadt Wittenberg – Jüterbog – Ludwigsfelde – Berlin Hbf – Eberswalde – Angermünde –	Schwedt (Oder)	low	60 min
RE 3	Lutherstadt Wittenberg – Jüterbog – Ludwigsfelde – Berlin Hbf – Eberswalde – Angermünde –	Prenzlau – Greifswald – Stralsund	low	60 min
RE 4	(Falkenberg (Elster) –) Jüterbog – Ludwigsfelde – Berlin Hbf – Berlin-Spandau – Dallgow-Döberitz – Wustermark – Rathenow (– Stendal)		low	60 min
RE 5	Berlin Südkreuz – Berlin Hbf – Berlin Gesundbrunnen – Oranienburg – Neustrelitz –	Güstrow – Rostock	low	60 min
RE 5	Berlin Südkreuz – Berlin Hbf – Berlin Gesundbrunnen – Oranienburg – Neustrelitz –	Neubrandenburg – Stralsund	low	60 min
RE 7	Dessau – Bad Belzig – Michendorf – Berlin-Wannsee – Berlin Hbf – Königs Wusterhausen – Lübben (Spreewald) – Senftenberg		high	60 min
RE 8	Wismar – Schwerin – Wittenberge – Nauen – Berlin-Spandau – Berlin Hbf – Potsdamer Platz – Südkreuz – Wünsdorf-Waldstadt – Luckau-Uckro – Doberlug-Kirchhain – Elsterwerda		low	60 min
RE 20	Berlin Hbf – Potsdamer Platz – Südkreuz – BER Airport – Königs Wusterhausen – Lübbenau (Spreewald) (– Vetschau – Cottbus)		low	60 min
RB 14	Nauen – Falkensee – Berlin-Spandau – Berlin-Charlottenburg – Berlin Hbf – Berlin Alexanderplatz – Berlin Ostbahnhof		high	60 min
RB 23	Golm – Potsdam – Potsdam Griebnitzsee – Berlin-Wannsee – Berlin Hbf – Berlin Alexanderplatz – Berlin Ostbahnhof		high	Peak only
As of 14 December 2025

=== S-Bahn and U-Bahn ===
Line	Route
S15	Hauptbahnhof – Wedding – Gesundbrunnen
S3	Spandau – Westkreuz – Hauptbahnhof – Alexanderplatz – Ostbahnhof – Karlshorst – Köpenick – Erkner
S5	Westkreuz – Hauptbahnhof – Alexanderplatz – Ostbahnhof – Lichtenberg – Strausberg Nord
S7	Potsdam – Wannsee – Westkreuz – Hauptbahnhof – Alexanderplatz – Ostbahnhof – Lichtenberg – Ahrensfelde
S9	Spandau – Westkreuz – Hauptbahnhof – Alexanderplatz – Ostbahnhof – Schöneweide – Flughafen Brandenburg
U5	Hauptbahnhof – Bundestag – Brandenburger Tor – Unter den Linden – Museumsinsel – Rotes Rathaus – Alexanderplatz – Frankfurter Allee – Lichtenberg – Wuhletal – Hönow

== See also ==
- List of central stations
- Railway stations in Berlin
- Berlin–Palermo railway axis
- Rail transport in Germany
