= Berlin-Wedding station =

Railway station in Berlin, Germany

Coordinates: 52°32′33″N 13°21′58″E

Wedding
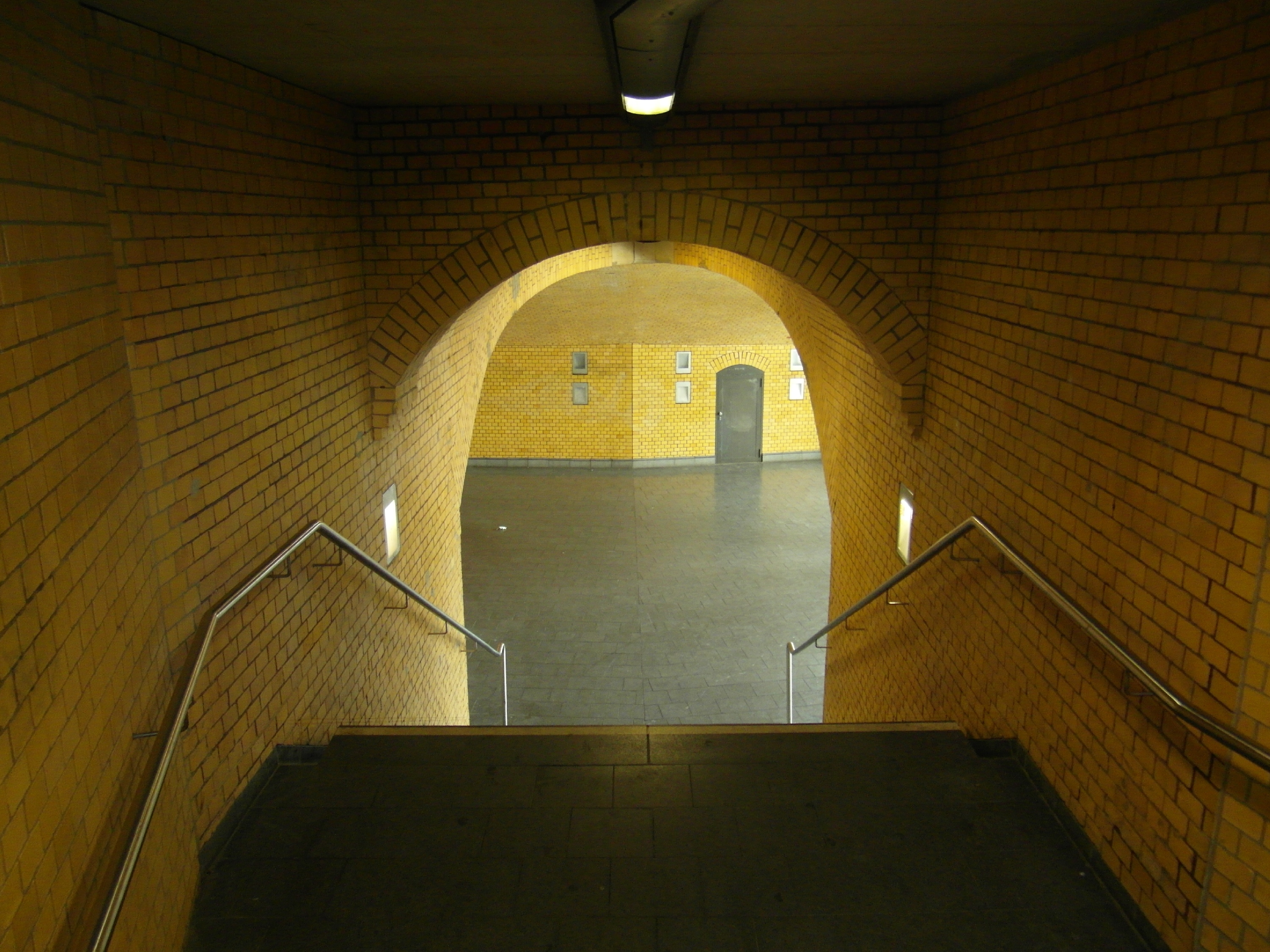
- Entrance to the S-Bahn station

General information
- Other names: Wedding ( only)
- Location: Wedding, Mitte, Berlin; Germany
- Lines: Ringbahn
- Platforms: 1; 1
- Tracks: 4; 2

Construction
- Structure type: Elevated (S-Bahn); Underground (U-Bahn)

Other information
- Station code: n/a
- DS100 code: BWED
- Category: 4
- Fare zone: VBB: Berlin A/5555

History
- Opened: Ringbahn: 1 May 1872; 154 years ago : 8 March 1923; 103 years ago reopened: 15 June 2002; 24 years ago
- Closed: strike: 18 September 1980, officially 28 September 1980; 45 years ago
- Electrified: 1 February 1929; 97 years ago

Services
| Preceding station | Berlin S-Bahn | Following station |
|---|---|---|
| Berlin Hbf Terminus | S15 | Gesundbrunnen Terminus |
| Westhafen One-way operation | S41 | Gesundbrunnen Ringbahn (clockwise) |
| Westhafen Ringbahn (counter-clockwise) | S42 | Gesundbrunnen One-way operation |
| Preceding station | Berlin U-Bahn | Following station |
| Leopoldplatz towards Alt-Tegel | U6 | Reinickendorfer Straße towards Alt-Mariendorf |
Location

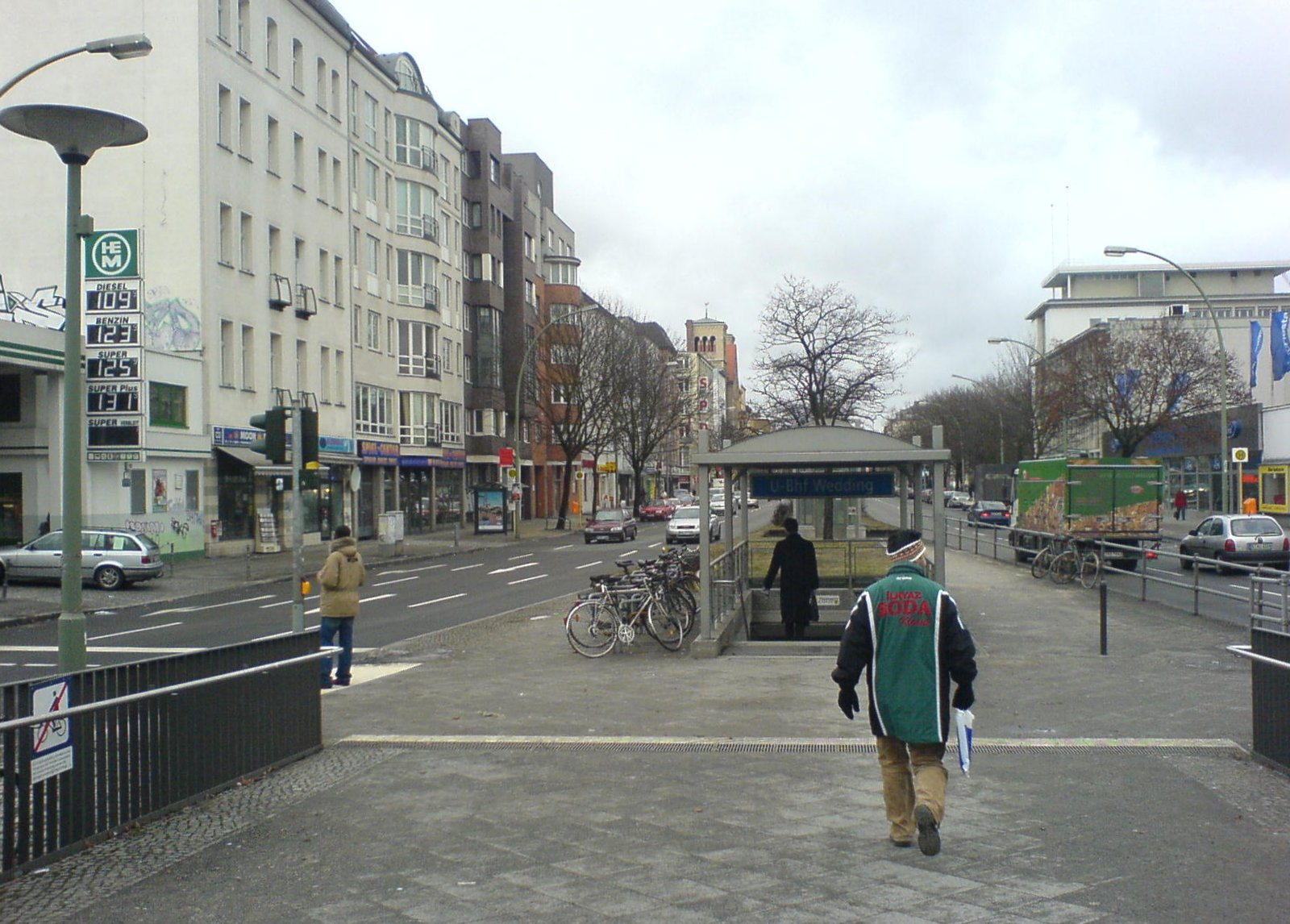
U-Bahn station Wedding, taken from the bottom of the steps to the S-Bahnhof of the same name

Berlin-Wedding is a station in the Wedding locality of Berlin and serves the S-Bahn lines S41 and S42 and the U-Bahn line U6.

== S-Bahn station ==
Wedding S-Bahn station first opened on 1 May 1872. It is part of the Berlin Ringbahn, a circular line traversing many of the central districts of the city. The service, however, was disrupted in 1961 by the building of the Berlin Wall and Wedding S-Bahn station went out of use in 1980 after passenger numbers on the route fell to unsustainable levels.

After the fall of the Berlin Wall, many disused S-Bahn routes were gradually reinstated. The section of line between the stations Westhafen and Gesundbrunnen, with Wedding as the only intermediate station, was the last of these to be reopened. This occurred on 16 June 2002, a date which was nicknamed Wedding-Day, a pun based on the clash of meanings of the word 'wedding' in English and German.

On New Year's Eve 2025 the S-Bahn station was damaged by a fire, causing services on the Ringbahn (S41/S42) to not stop at the station until the 9th of February 2026. The fire damaged the roof and lighting of the station. The U-Bahn station was largely unaffected.

== U-Bahn station ==
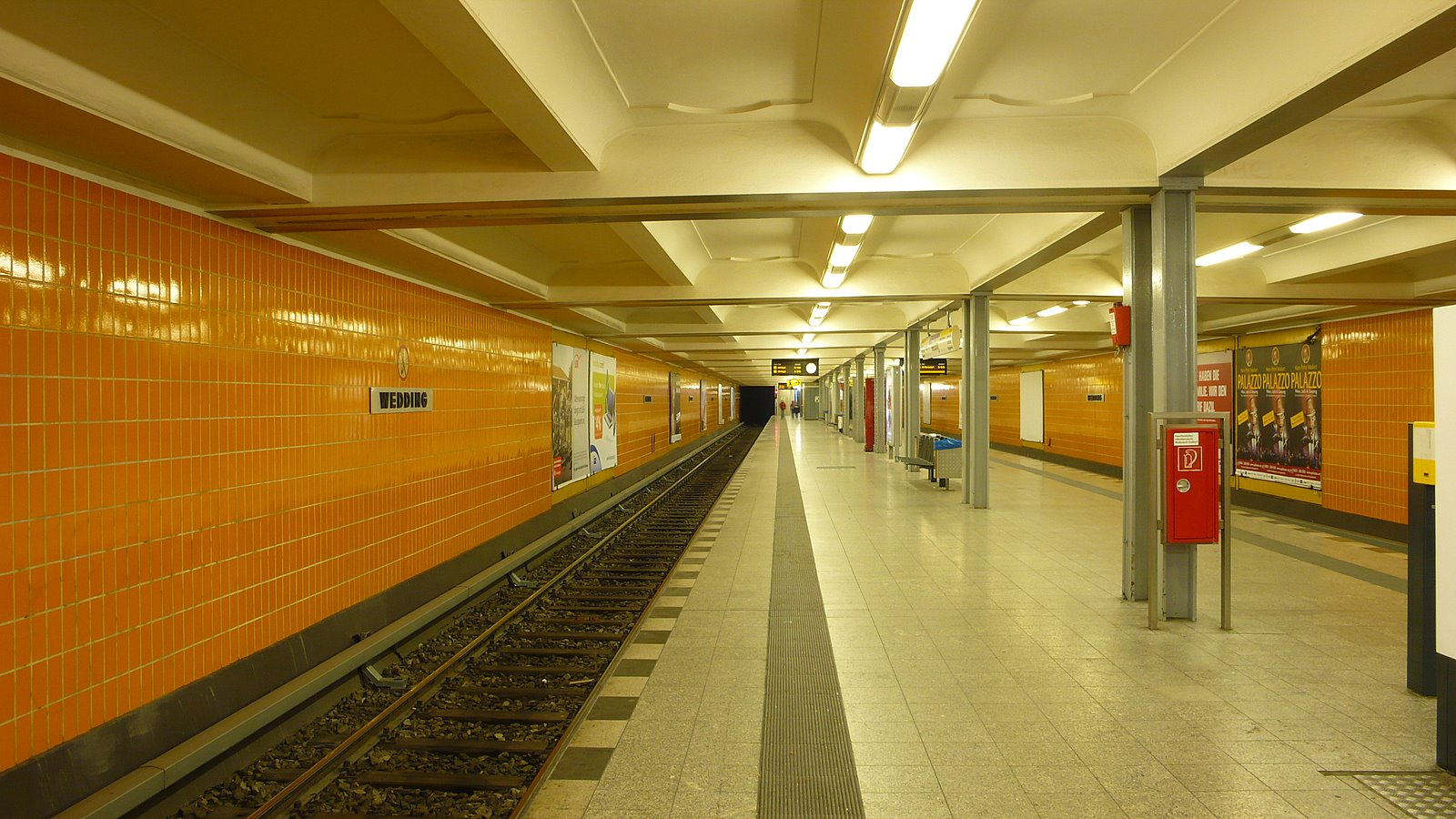
Subway station Wedding

Wedding U-Bahn station first opened on 8 March 1923 along with the rest of the newly built line between the stations Stettiner Bahnhof (now Naturkundemuseum) and Seestraße. It was opened bearing the name Bahnhof Wedding (Wedding station), reflecting the fact that there existed interchange with the adjoining station served by long-distance trains.

On 3/4 November 1943, the access was spilled. The month of October was calm, the damage could be remedied relatively quickly, so that an orderly operation could be carried out again.

It was given its current name in 1972 as the station no longer existed, and has greatly increased in significance since 2002 when the interchange with the S-Bahn was reinstated.

== Other transport links ==
In addition to its rail links, the station is also served by two bus lines during the day (one of which runs continuously) and two at night. The nearby Nettelbeckplatz was once a major hub for tram lines, but these were removed in 1958.
