= S21 (Berlin) =

Railway line in Berlin, Germany

S21 or City S-Bahn is a project to build a second north-south route for the Berlin S-Bahn. The new route will parallel the Nord-Süd Tunnel and connect Berlin Hauptbahnhof to the Berlin Ringbahn, both to the north and south. The first section of the project opened on June 15, 2026; the line that operates on the newly opened route is initially designated S15. Further extensions are still in the planning phase.

== S15 ==

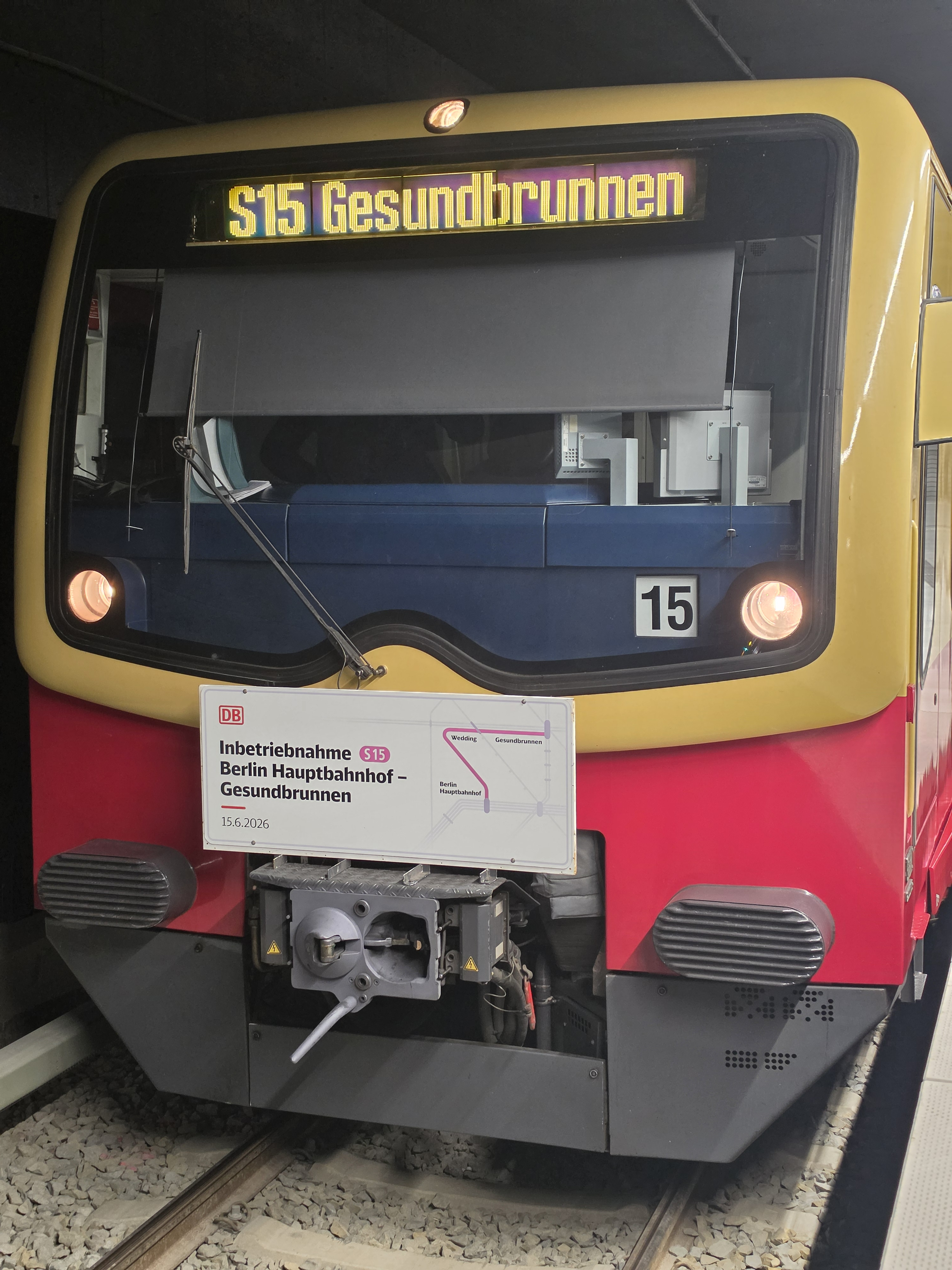
- S15 shuttle train to Gesundbrunnen at Berlin Hauptbahnhof on the opening day of the partially completed line

Overview
- Line number: 6019

Technical
- Track gauge: 1435
- Electrification: 800 V Third rail DC

S15 is a line on the Berlin S-Bahn. It operates from Berlin Hauptbahnhof to Wedding over:

- The first phase of the S21 line, completed in 2026
- the Ring line, completed in 1877 and electrified in 1926

== History ==
In June 1992, the Federal Ministry of Transport decided on the mushroom concept. It provided for the construction of a central station (Berlin Hauptbahnhof) on the site of the former Lehrter Bahnhof. While the area in the east-west direction had already been developed with the construction of the Berlin Stadtbahn, there was no efficient inner-city connection in a north-south direction. For this purpose, the construction of an S-Bahn line was proposed, which should lead to the northwest to the Berlin Ringbahn and on to Berlin Tegel Airport. Towards the south a route was planned via Potsdamer Platz to Yorckstraße and beyond. A little later, an eastward connection to the Ringbahn (towards Wedding and Gesundbrunnen) was added to the plan. In May 1993, it emerged that a standardized assessment of the S21 did not even come close to achieving a benefit–cost ratio of 1.

Within the Senate of Berlin there were different views on the project. The CDU Transport Senator Herwig Haase endorsed the concept; The SPD Building Senator Wolfgang Nagel opposed it because of the high cost. After the federal government was not ready to finance the project, the Senate decided on October 5, 1993, to renounce the immediate construction of the track. On November 30, it also waived the maintenance of a right of way for the project. The project was estimated to cost around one billion Deutsche Mark at the time. Haase continued trying to get the Senate to approve a right of way and the construction of a tunnel section under Potsdamer Platz, fearing that this would not be possible once the development of that area was completed. In December 1994, the Senate again rejected Haase's plans. In January 1995, however, the Berlin House of Representatives instructed the Senate to reverse its decision and keep the right of way, with the SPD voting in favour of the resolution. This decision, however did not include the westward connection to the northern Ringbahn (towards Westhafen and Tegel).

In the autumn of 1999, the Berlin Senate assured Deutsche Bahn of prefinancing for the shell construction of the S21, including both the eastern and western connections to the northern Ringbahn. The station at Berlin Hauptbahnhof was to be built together with its mainline underground station. At the time, Deutsche Bahn estimated that the S21 could begin operation together with the mainline north-south tunnel in mid-2005. However, the unclear financing situation caused further delays in construction. At the beginning of 2001, the federal government stated that it still considered the route unnecessary and did not want to finance it. In 2004, the federal government told the Senate it might be able to finance the full construction in 2008.

By June 2026, construction on the first phase of the project was completed, and the first trains between Gesundbrunnen and Hauptbahnhof ran on June 15, operating under the route number S15. The opening of this first section was originally planned for 2017. The project leader estimated that the second phase would be completed in the middle to late 2030s and the third, in the mid-2040s.

== Future ==
S21
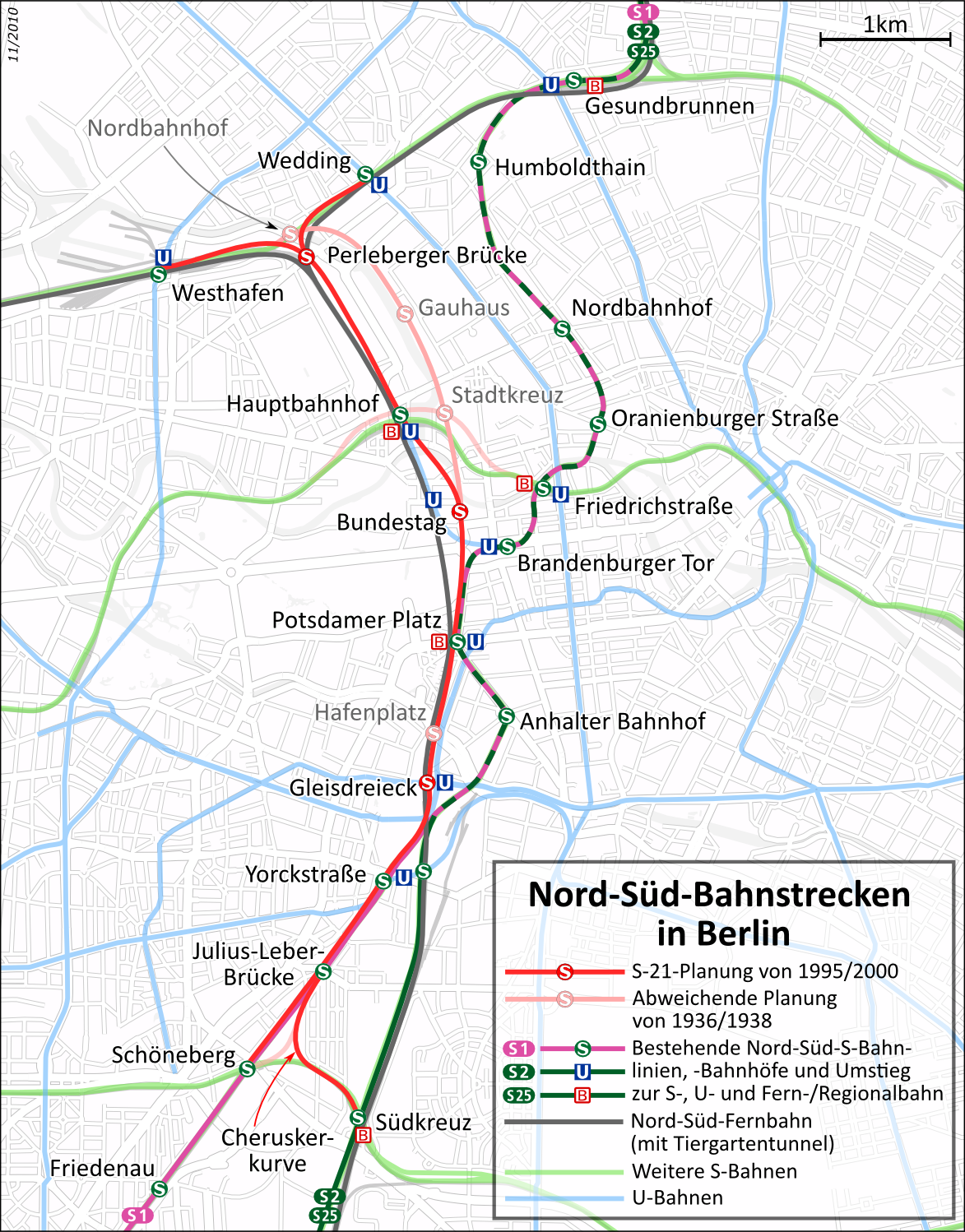
- S21 route plan.

Overview
- Line number: 6017 Westhafen–Hbf–Potsdamer Platz; 6019 Wedding–Hauptbahnhof

Technical
- Track gauge: 1435
- Electrification: 800 V Third rail DC

With the opening of the second section (Hauptbahnhof – Potsdamer Platz), there will be changes. S1, which goes from Oranienburg to Wannsee, will be diverted via the second north-south line, while the first north-south line will still have S2, S25, and S26. Finally, the S85 that was terminating at Pankow, will be diverted at Schönhauser Allee via the Berliner Ringbahn, then Berlin Hauptbahnhof, Potsdamer Platz, Yorckstraße (Großgörschenstraße), Schöneberg, Steglitz and terminating at Zehlendorf via S1 to increase frequencies on the Wannsee line.
