= Shainberg =

Shainberg is a surname. Notable people with the surname include:

- Steven Shainberg (born 1963), American film director and producer
- Lawrence Shainberg, American author

== See also ==
Similar surnames
- Schönberg, Schönberger, Schoenberg, Schoenberger
- Schöneberg, Schöneberger, Schoeneberg, Schoeneberger
- Schönenberg, Schönenberger, Schoenenberg, Schoenenberger
- Schoonenberg, Schoonberg, Scheinberg/Sheinberg, Shainberg
