= Sheinberg =

Sheinberg and Scheinberg are surnames derived from the Yiddish words for "pretty" (shein) and "mountain" (berg). Notable people with this name include:

- Carrie Sheinberg (born 1972), American skier
- Chaim Pinchas Scheinberg (1910–2012), Israeli rabbi
- David A. Scheinberg, American physician
- David Sheinberg, better known as Isay Davydov (1927–2020), Russian writer and journalist
- Herbert Scheinberg (ca. 1919 – 2009), American physician
- Isai Scheinberg (born ca. 1946), founder of an online poker site
- Katya Scheinberg, Russian-American applied mathematician
- Mark Scheinberg (born 1973), Israeli-Canadian businessman
- Matafia Scheinberg or Matafia Šeinbergas, Lithuanian chess player
- Sidney Sheinberg (1935–2019), American entertainment executive

== See also ==
Similar surnames
- Schönberg, Schönberger, Schoenberg, Schoenberger
- Schöneberg, Schöneberger, Schoeneberg, Schoeneberger
- Schönenberg, Schönenberger, Schoenenberg, Schoenenberger
- Schoonenberg, Schoonberg, Scheinberg/Sheinberg
