= Schönberger =

Schönberger or Schoenberger is a German toponymic surname meaning "someone from Schönberg". Notable people with the surname include:

- Alan Schoenberger (born 1989, Brisbane, Australia), Australian infielder
- Ann Schonberger (1940–2022), American professor
- Armand Schönberger, Hungarian painter
- Belinda Schönberger (born 1991), Austrian figure skater
- Guido Schoenberger (1891–1974), German-American art historian
- James A. Schoenberger
- Jenő Schönberger (German: Eugen Schönberger; born 1959, Turulung (Hungarian: Túrterebes)), Hungarian-Romanian Roman Catholic bishop
- Lorenz Adolf Schönberger
- Margaret Schönberger Mahler, née Schönberger (Hungarian: Schönberger Margit; 1897–1985, Sopron - 1985), Jewish Hungarian physician
- Marlene Schönberger (born 1990), German politician
- Noémi Ban (1922–2019), born: Noémi Schönberger, Jewish Hungarian-American lecturer, public speaker, and teacher
- Sandro Schoenberger, German ice hockey player
- Sebastian Schönberger, Austrian cyclist
- Thomas Schönberger (born in 1986, Graz), Austrian football player
- Viktor Mayer-Schönberger (born 1966), Austrian academic

== See also ==
- Schönberger Land
  - Niendorf/Amt Schönberger Land

Similar surnames
- Schönberg, Schönberger, Schoenberg, Schoenberger
- Schöneberg, Schöneberger, Schoeneberg, Schoeneberger
- Schönenberg, Schönenberger, Schoenenberg, Schoenenberger
- Schoonenberg, Schoonberg, Sheinberg
