= Schoonenberg (disambiguation) =

Schoonenberg, also spelled Schonenberg and Schonenbergh, was a Dutch trading ship.

Schoonenberg may also refer to:

- Piet Schoonenberg (1911–1999), Dutch Jesuit priest, theologian and professor of theology
- Sportpark Schoonenberg – Football stadium in the Netherlands

== See also ==
- Schönberg, Schönberger, Schoenberg, Schoenberger
- Schöneberg, Schöneberger, Schoeneberg, Schoeneberger
- Schönenberg, Schönenberger, Schoenenberg, Schoenenberger
