= Schöneberg (disambiguation) =

Schöneberg is a district of Berlin, Germany

Schöneberg may also refer to:

- Schöneberg (surname)
- Schöneberg, Brandenburg, a former municipality in the district of Uckermark, Brandenburg, Germany
- Schöneberg, Altenkirchen, a municipality in the district of Altenkirchen, Rhineland-Palatinate, Germany
- Schöneberg, Bad Kreuznach, a municipality in the district of Bad Kreuznach, Rhineland-Palatinate, Germany
- Schöneberg (Hofgeismar), a neighborhood in Hofgeismar, in the district of Kassel, in northern Hesse, Germany

== See also ==
- Schönberg (disambiguation)
- Schönenberg (disambiguation)
- Schönberg, Schönberger, Schoenberg, Schoenberger
- Schöneberg, Schöneberger, Schoeneberg, Schoeneberger
- Schönenberg, Schönenberger, Schoenenberg, Schoenenberger
