= Oder-Welse =

German municipality

Coordinates: 53.117°N 13.733°E

Amt Oder-Welse is a former Amt ("collective municipality") in the district of Uckermark, in Brandenburg, Germany. Its seat was in Pinnow. It was disbanded in April 2022.

The Amt Oder-Welse consisted of the following municipalities:

1. Berkholz-Meyenburg
2. Mark Landin
3. Passow
4. Pinnow

== Demography ==
Development of population since 1875 within the current Boundaries (Blue Line: Population; Dotted Line: Comparison to Population development in Brandenburg state; Grey Background: Time of Nazi Germany; Red Background: Time of communist East Germany)

Recent Population Development and Projections (Population Development before Census 2011 (blue line); Recent Population Development according to the Census in Germany in 2011 (blue bordered line); Official projections for 2005-2030 (yellow line); for 2014-2030 (red line); for 2017-2030 (scarlet line)

Amt Oder-Welse: Population development
within the current boundaries (2020)

Year	Pop.	±% p.a.
1875	4,426	—
1890	4,193	−0.36%
1910	4,088	−0.13%
1925	4,284	+0.31%
1939	3,960	−0.56%
1950	6,026	+3.89%
1964	4,902	−1.46%

Year	Pop.	±% p.a.
1971	4,717	−0.55%
1981	4,149	−1.27%
1985	4,129	−0.12%
1990	4,066	−0.31%
1995	4,341	+1.32%
2000	5,075	+3.17%
2005	5,045	−0.12%

Year	Pop.	±% p.a.
2010	4,939	−0.42%
2015	4,597	−1.42%
2016	4,591	−0.13%
2017	4,593	+0.04%
2018	4,520	−1.59%
2019	4,562	+0.93%
2020	4,552	−0.22%
