= Schöneberg (surname) =

Schöneberg or Schoeneberg is a German toponymic surname, a variant of Schönberg. Notable people with the surname include:

- Kevin Schöneberg, German footballer
- Lisa Schoeneberg, American curler
- Manfred Schöneberg (born 1946), German chess player
- Stella von Schöneberg

== See also ==
- Schönberg, Schönberger, Schoenberg, Schoenberger
- Schöneberg, Schöneberger, Schoeneberg, Schoeneberger
- Schönenberg, Schönenberger, Schoenenberg, Schoenenberger
