= Schönberg =

Schönberg (German: beautiful mountain) may refer to:

- Schönberg (surname)

== Places ==
=== Austria ===
- Schönberg im Stubaital, a municipality in the district of Innsbruck-Land, Tyrol
- Schönberg am Kamp, a town in the district of Krems-Land, Lower Austria

=== Belgium ===
- Schönberg (Sankt-Vith), a part of Sankt Vith, Eupen-Malmedy

=== Czech Republic ===
- Mährisch Schönberg, German name for the town Šumperk

=== Germany ===
- Schönberg (Ebringen), a mountain near Freiburg im Breisgau, Baden-Württemberg
- Schönberg, Lower Bavaria, a town in the district of Freyung-Grafenau, Bavaria
- Schönberg, Upper Bavaria, a town in the district of Mühldorf, Bavaria
- Schönberg (Bavarian Prealps), a mountain of the Tegernsee Mountains, Bavaria
- Schönberg (Bensheim), since 1939 a suburb of Bensheim, Hesse
- Schönberg, a Ortsteil of Kronberg im Taunus in the district of Hochtaunuskreis, Hesse
- Schönberg, Mecklenburg-Vorpommern, a town in the district of Nordwestmecklenburg, Mecklenburg-Vorpommern
- Schönberg, Rhineland-Palatinate, a municipality in the district of Bernkastel-Wittlich, Rhineland-Palatinate
- Schönberg (Cunewalde)/Šumbark, district of Cunewalde, Saxony
- Schönberg, Saxony, a municipality in the district of Zwickau, Saxony
- Schönberg am Kapellenberg, a Ortsteil of Bad Brambach, in the district of Vogtlandkreis, Saxony
- Schönberg, Saxony-Anhalt, a town in the district of Stendal, Saxony-Anhalt
- Schönberg, Lauenburg, a municipality in the district of Lauenburg, Schleswig-Holstein
- Schönberg, Plön, a municipality in the district of Plön, Schleswig-Holstein

=== Latvia ===
- Schönberg, the German name for the village Skaistkalne

=== Liechtenstein ===
- Schönberg (Liechtenstein), a mountain in the Rätikon

=== Poland ===
- Schönberg, the German name for Szymbark, a castle ruins and town in former East Prussia
- Schönberg, the German name for Sulików in Lower Silesian Voivodeship, formerly in western Prussia

=== Romania ===
- Schönberg, the German name for Dealu Frumos, Merghindeal (Mergeln) commune, in Sibiu County, Transylvania, Romania.

== See also ==
- Schoenberg (surname)
- Shoenberg (disambiguation)
- Schöneberg (disambiguation)
- Schönenberg (disambiguation)
- Schönburg (disambiguation)
