= Landin =

Landin is a surname. Notable people with the surname include:

- Peter J. Landin (1930–2009), British computer scientist
- Mark Landin, municipality in Brandenburg, Germany
- Niklas Landin Jacobsen (born 1988), Danish handballer
- Luis Ángel Landín (born 1985), Mexican footballer

== See also ==
- Landing (disambiguation)
