= Shoenberg =

Shoenberg is a surname. Notable people with the surname include:

- Isaac Shoenberg (1880–1963), Russian-born British electronic engineer
- David Shoenberg (1911–2004), British physicist and son of Isaac

== See also ==
- Schoenberg, a surname
- Schönberg (disambiguation)
