= Johann Christian Ritter =

German pioneer of printing in South Africa

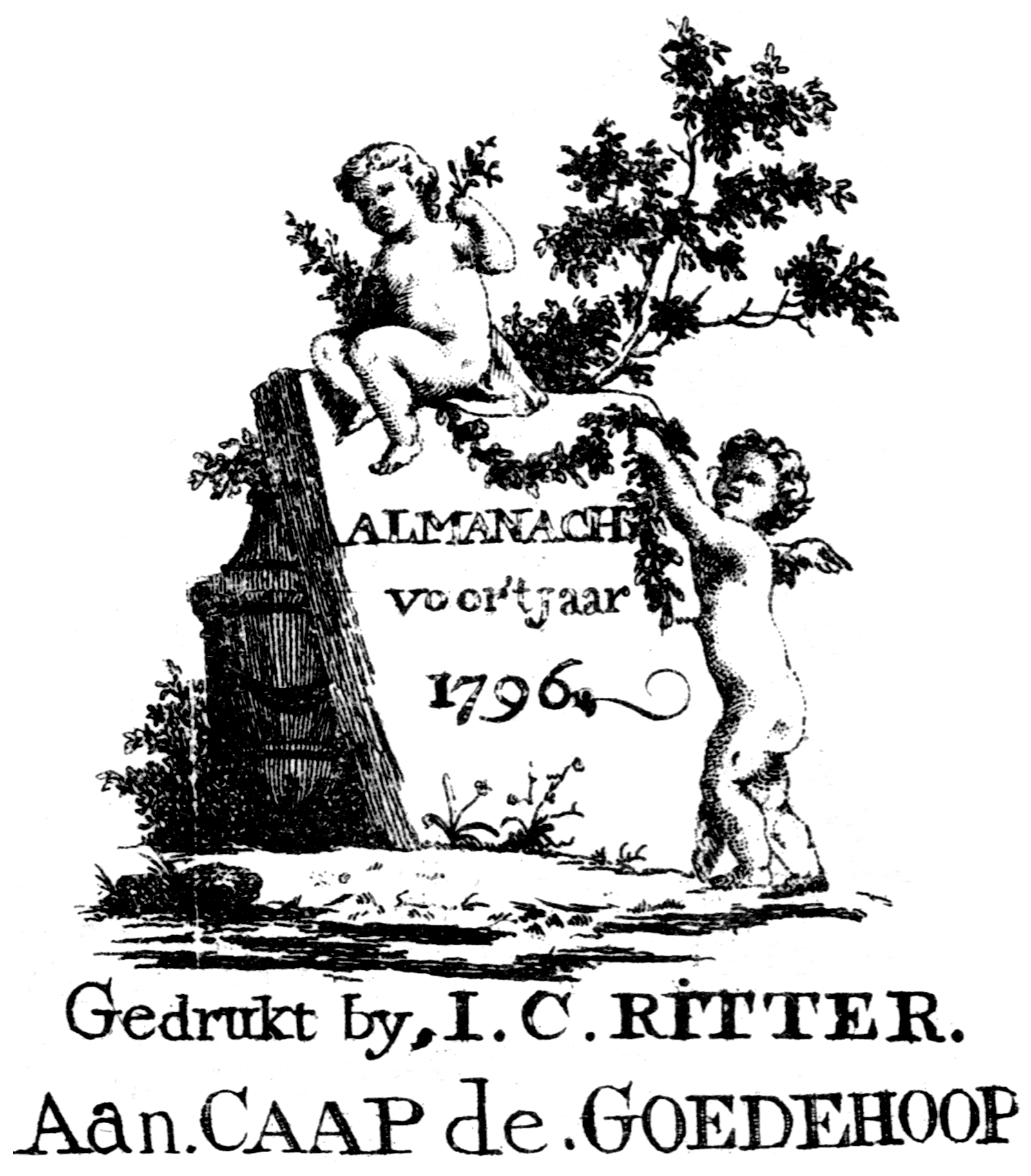
Extract from Almanach voor't jaar 1796, 92 × 105 mm

Johann Christian Ritter (25 July 1755 – 9 September 1810) was a German in the service of the Dutch East India Company who came to the Dutch Cape Colony in 1784. He was the first to print in the Cape, the earliest record is an almanac titled "Almanach voor't jaar 1796".

== History ==
J. C. Ritter was born in 1755 either in Bayreuth or Hof an der Saale, these are cities less than 50 km distant from each other in what was then the Holy Roman Empire and may have referred to the same place. He was the Son of the book binder Georg Stephan Ritter and his wife Johanna Dorothea (née Leidenforst). He married Barbara Fuhrmann of Danzig and they had no children and she died after him in 1813-6-9.

He was in the service of the Dutch East India Company when he arrived at the Cape Colony in the later half of 1784 and was appointed by them in 1794 to print government notices, forms and so forth.

In the 10 years before he started to print he bound books, he may have been a book binder by trade when he arrived at the Cape though it may be that he took on this work through familiarity, having been the son of a bookbinder.

He died at the age of 55.

== Legacy ==
It is not certain if he brought the small hand-press with him or if the press only arrived later when he prepared for printing or was appointed to the task.

He undertook to print official forms and handbills as well as almanacs. The surviving (1796) almanac was printed in 1795. As he also printed almanacs for at least the years 1795 and 1797, so he would likely have started his printing in 1794 or before but none of his earlier work has been discovered. His almanac did not bring him any great financial reward, having been used by many to copy out of by hand, notwithstanding some factual errors relating to dates of lunar eclipses. Only one copy of the first leaf is known to exist in the Sir George Grey Collection of the South African Library and this one may be a proof sheet.

Soon after 1797 when the British took occupation of the Cape, permission to print was transferred to Messrs Walker and Robertson who had questionable ties with the briefly serving governor Sir George Yonge even though Ritter and Harry Harwood Smith, a printing contemporary of his, had petitioned for the printing rights.

Ritter's press may also have been used in 1799 by V.A. Schoonberg for printing the first book in South Africa which was also the first printed religious text. It was a translation, into Dutch, of a letter brought to the Cape, and published, by J.T. van der Kemp of the London Missionary Society. It was used to print a military proclamation in 1799 as it was the only available press.

== See also ==
- Global spread of the printing press – to see how printing spread to the European colonies, often political or religious limitations restricted the spread of printing faster than the public might have desired.
