= Schwedt =

- Town
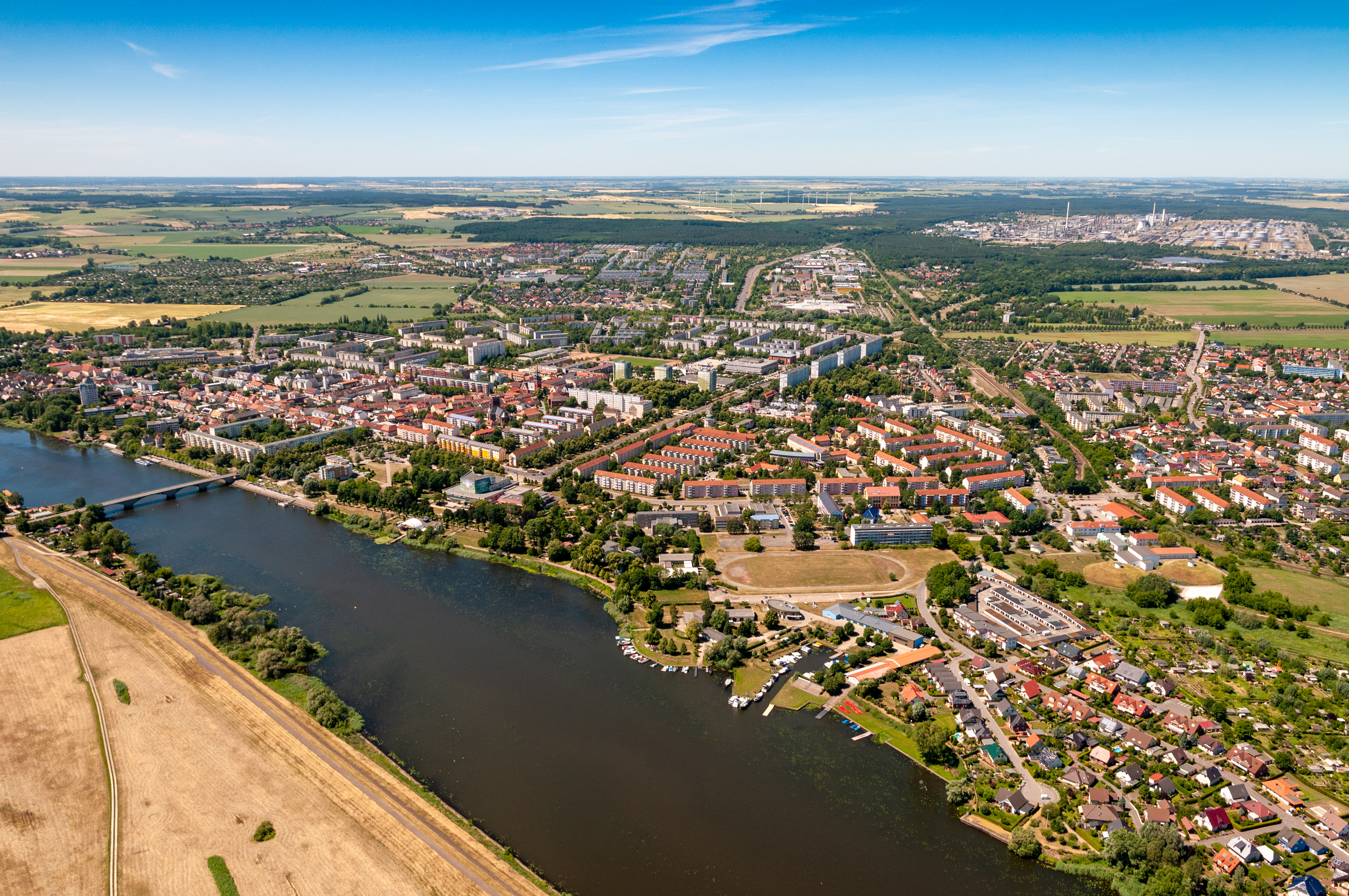
- Aerial view

- Coat of arms

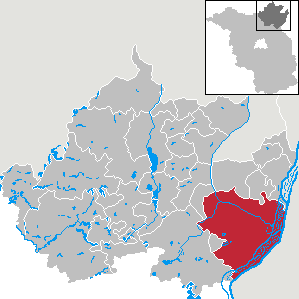
- Location of Schwedt within Uckermark district
- Interactive map of Schwedt
- Location within Germany Location within Brandenburg
- Coordinates: 53°03′N 14°16′E
- Country: Germany
- State: Brandenburg
- District: Uckermark

Government
  - Mayor (2021–29): Annekathrin Hoppe (SPD)

Area
  - Total: 360.73 km^{2} (139.28 sq mi)
- Elevation: 6 m (20 ft)

Population (2025-12-31)
  - Total: 33,633
  - Density: 93.236/km^{2} (241.48/sq mi)
- Time zone: UTC+01:00 (CET)
  - Summer (DST): UTC+02:00 (CEST)
- Postal codes: 16303
- Dialling codes: 03332, 033336
- Vehicle registration: UM, SDT
- Website: www.schwedt.eu

Schwedt (or Schwedt/Oder; German: [ˈʃveːt]) is a town in Brandenburg, in northeastern Germany. With the official status of a Große kreisangehörige Stadt (major district town), it is the largest town of the Uckermark district, located near the river Oder, which forms the border with Poland.

== Overview ==
The formerly agrarian town today has one of the largest oil refineries (PCK Raffinerie GmbH) in Germany, established in 1958 and connected to the Russian Druzhba pipeline network. The refinery uses 20 million cubic meters of water per year for the process.

A large paper factory (UPM) is located near Schwedt. Most industries were located in the remote area during communist rule in the 1960s and 1970s.

Large residential areas were built for the workers moving to Schwedt. About 9% of the town's flats are in prefab concrete buildings (Plattenbau) dating from the era. As many jobs were lost after German reunification and the return to market economy, Schwedt has lost a quarter of its population since 1990. In recent decades, Schwedt became a model town for the demolition of Plattenbau housing to combat urban decay.

== Geography ==
Schwedt is situated in the east of the historic Uckermark region stretching from the Oder to the Havel River. It is situated on a sandur at the western edge of the Oder floodplain running along the German-Polish border, which in 1995 was declared as the Lower Oder Valley National Park nature reserve. Across the river and the border, about 10 km (6.2 mi) to the southeast, is the Polish town of Chojna. The nearest German towns are Angermünde (about 18 km (11 mi) to the west) and Gartz (18 km (11 mi) down the Oder).

=== Local districts ===
In a 1974 municipal reform, the neighbouring village of Heinersdorf was incorporated into Schwedt, followed by Blumenhagen, Gatow and Kunow in 1993, by Kummerow in 1998, by Criewen and Zützen in 2001, Stendell in 2002, the former town Vierraden in 2003, Schöneberg in January 2021 and Berkholz-Meyenburg, Mark Landin and Passow in April 2022. With 360.73 km^{2} (139.28 mi^{2}) Schwedt is among the 10 largest German municipalities by area (9th as of Nov. 2023).

=== Nearest cities and towns ===
Gartz (Germany), Penkun (Germany), Szczecin (Poland), Gryfino (Poland), Cedynia (Poland), Chojna (Poland), Mieszkowice (Poland), Moryń (Poland), Trzcińsko-Zdrój (Poland), Myślibórz (Poland), Pyrzyce (Poland).

== History ==
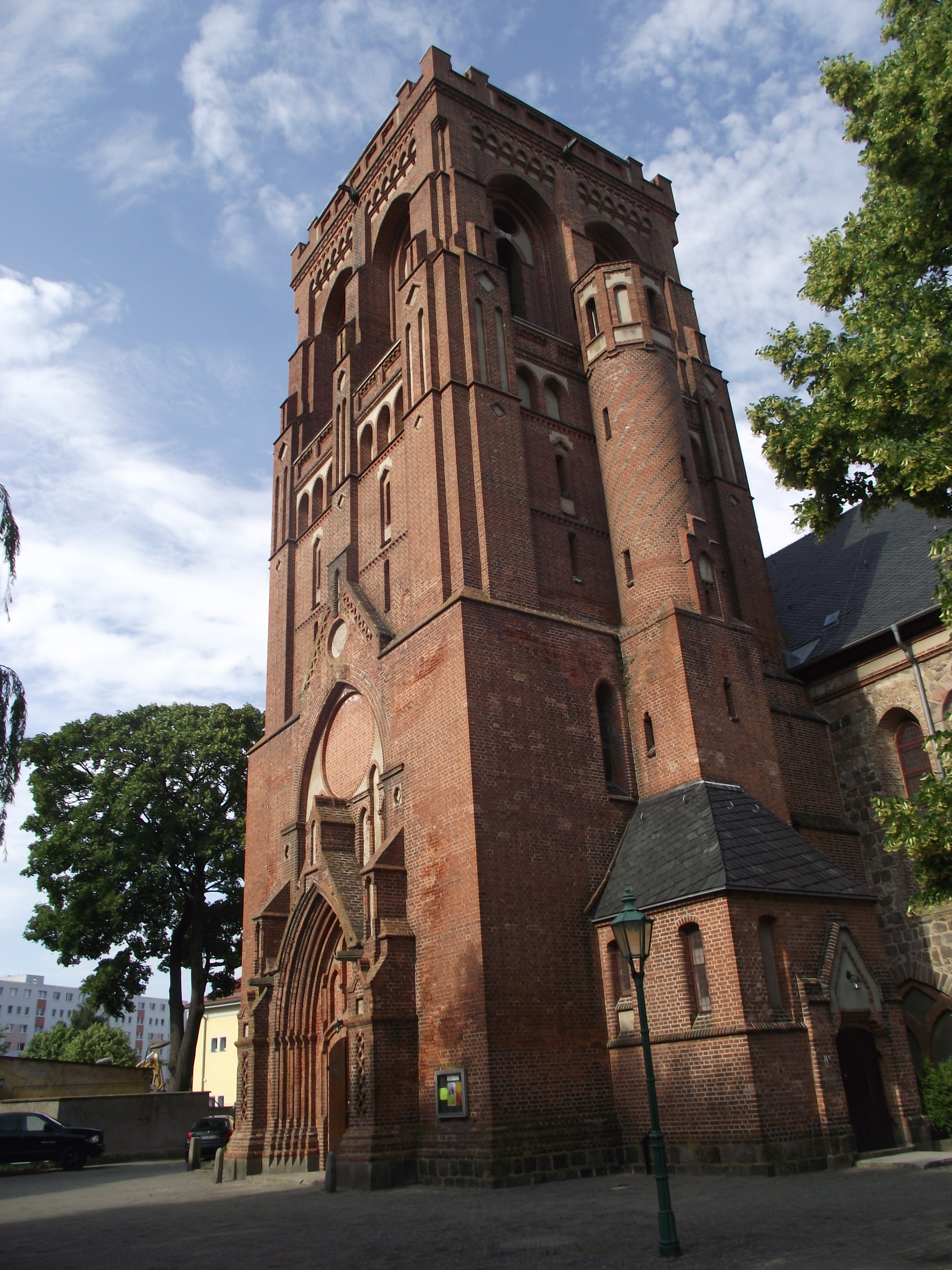
Medieval Saint Catherine church

After the Migration Period, the area had been settled by Polabian Slavs. From 937 onwards the lands of the Slavic Ukrani tribes in the west were subdued by the Saxon forces of Margrave Gero and incorporated into his vast Marca Geronis, while the lands east of the Oder were held by Pomeranian tribes under sovereignty of the newly formed Duchy of Poland ruled by Duke Mieszko I. The Saxon Northern March was lost in the Great Slav Rising of 983, and not before 1147 the Saxon count Albert the Bear again invaded the lands on the Oder river, which remained disputed between the newly established Margraviate of Brandenburg and the Pomeranian dukes.

The settlement of Schwedt was first mentioned in a 1265 deed. In the course of the Brandenburg–Pomeranian conflict, the Brandenburg margrave Louis II the Roman ceded it to Duke Barnim III of Pomerania in 1354. It was again besieged by the first Hohenzollern margrave Frederick I in 1434, but to no avail. In 1481 the Thuringian counts of Hohnstein acquired the estates; they granted town privileges to Schwedt as well as to neighbouring Vierraden and introduced the Protestant Reformation.

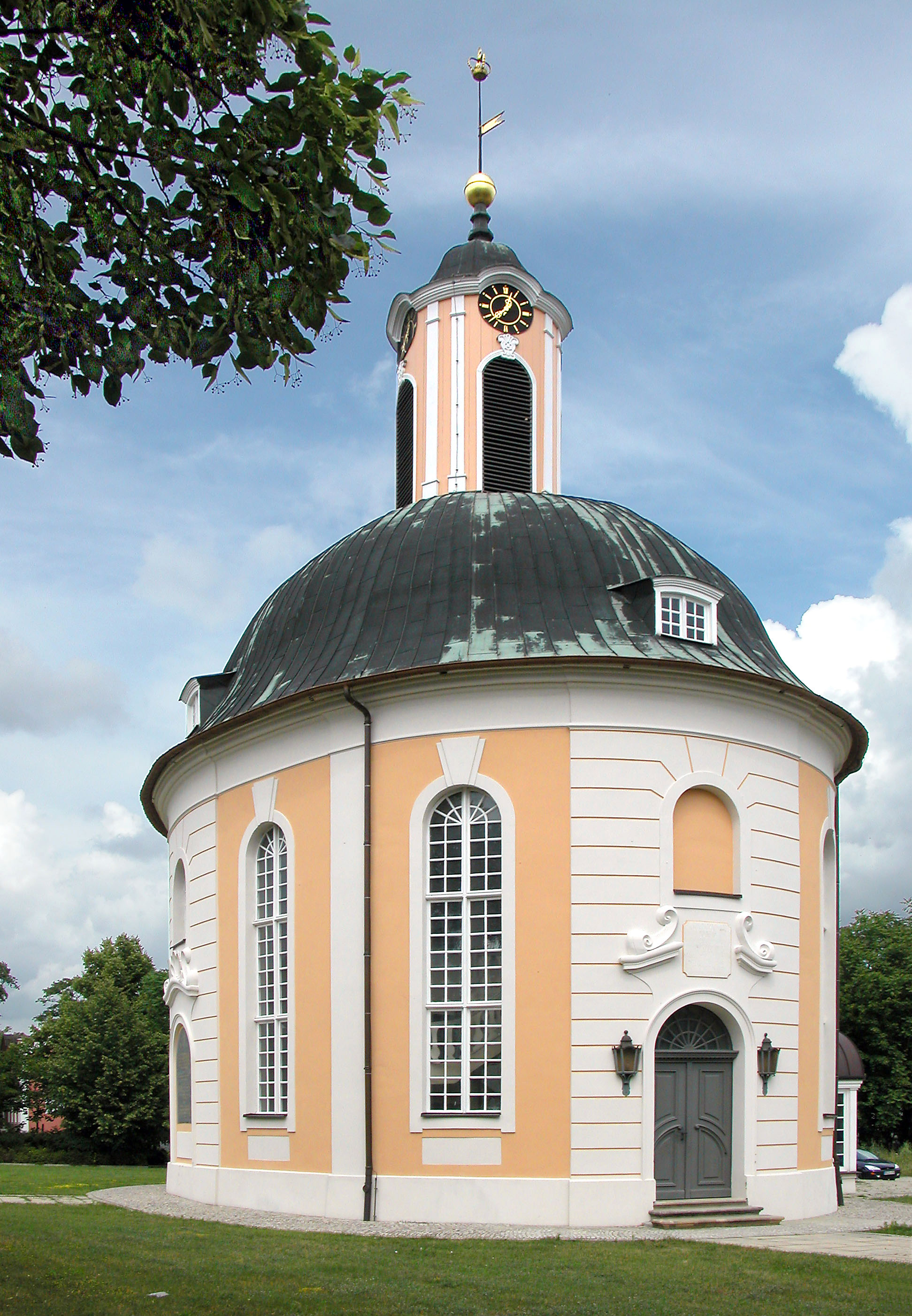
Former French church

The rise of Schwedt came to an end with the extinction of the Hohnstein counts in 1609 and the disastrous Thirty Years' War, when the town on the road from Stettin (Szczecin) to Berlin was plundered several times. In 1631 King Gustavus Adolphus of Sweden, after landing in Pomerania, camped here on his way to the Battle of Breitenfeld. Six years later the Swedish field marshal Johan Banér set the town on fire, after its citizens refused to capitulate.

In the 1680s, a commune of French Huguenots was established in the town. During the Great Northern War, the Treaty of Schwedt was signed in the town.

From 1815 to 1945, Schwedt was part of the Prussian Province of Brandenburg.

Near the end of World War II, over two months of heavy fighting destroyed an estimated 85 percent of the town, including the Schwedt Castle. The Soviet Army occupied Schwedt on April 26, 1945, two weeks before the final defeat of Nazi Germany. From 1945 to 1952, Schwedt was part of the state of Brandenburg and from 1952 to 1990 of the Bezirk Frankfurt of East Germany. During the 1960s, the government of the DDR expanded housing and encouraged people to move to Schwedt, a trend that ended with German reunification. Since 1990, Schwedt is again part of the State of Brandenburg.

== Demography ==
Residents by country of birth
Nationality	Population (2022)	
Germany	30,693	91.4%
Poland	1,131	3.4%
Russia	464	1.38%
Czech Republic	173	0.52%
Kazakhstan	172	0.51%
Syria	148	0.44%
Ukraine	143	0.43%

Development of population since 1875 within the current Boundaries (Blue Line: Population; Dotted Line: Comparison to Population development in Brandenburg state; Grey Background: Time of Nazi Germany; Red Background: Time of communist East Germany)

Recent Population Development and Projections (Population Development before Census 2011 (blue line); Recent Population Development according to the Census in Germany in 2011 (blue bordered line); Official projections for 2005–2030 (yellow line); for 2017–2030 (scarlet line); for 2020–2030 (green line)

Schwedt/Oder: Population development
within the current boundaries (2020)

Year	Pop.	±% p.a.
1875	15,127	—
1890	14,709	−0.19%
1910	14,125	−0.20%
1925	13,640	−0.23%
1939	13,512	−0.07%
1950	12,418	−0.76%
1964	23,441	+4.64%

Year	Pop.	±% p.a.
1971	38,211	+7.23%
1981	54,933	+3.70%
1985	54,142	−0.36%
1990	53,628	−0.19%
1995	49,371	−1.64%
2000	42,261	−3.06%
2005	37,259	−2.49%

Year	Pop.	±% p.a.
2010	34,035	−1.79%
2015	30,262	−2.32%
2016	30,182	−0.26%
2017	30,075	−0.35%
2018	29,920	−0.52%
2019	29,680	−0.80%
2020	29,433	−0.83%

== Twin towns – sister cities ==
Schwedt is twinned with:

- Chojna, Poland
- Gryfino, Poland
- Koszalin, Poland
- Leverkusen, Germany
- Moryń, Poland
- Tuapse, Russia

== Notable people ==
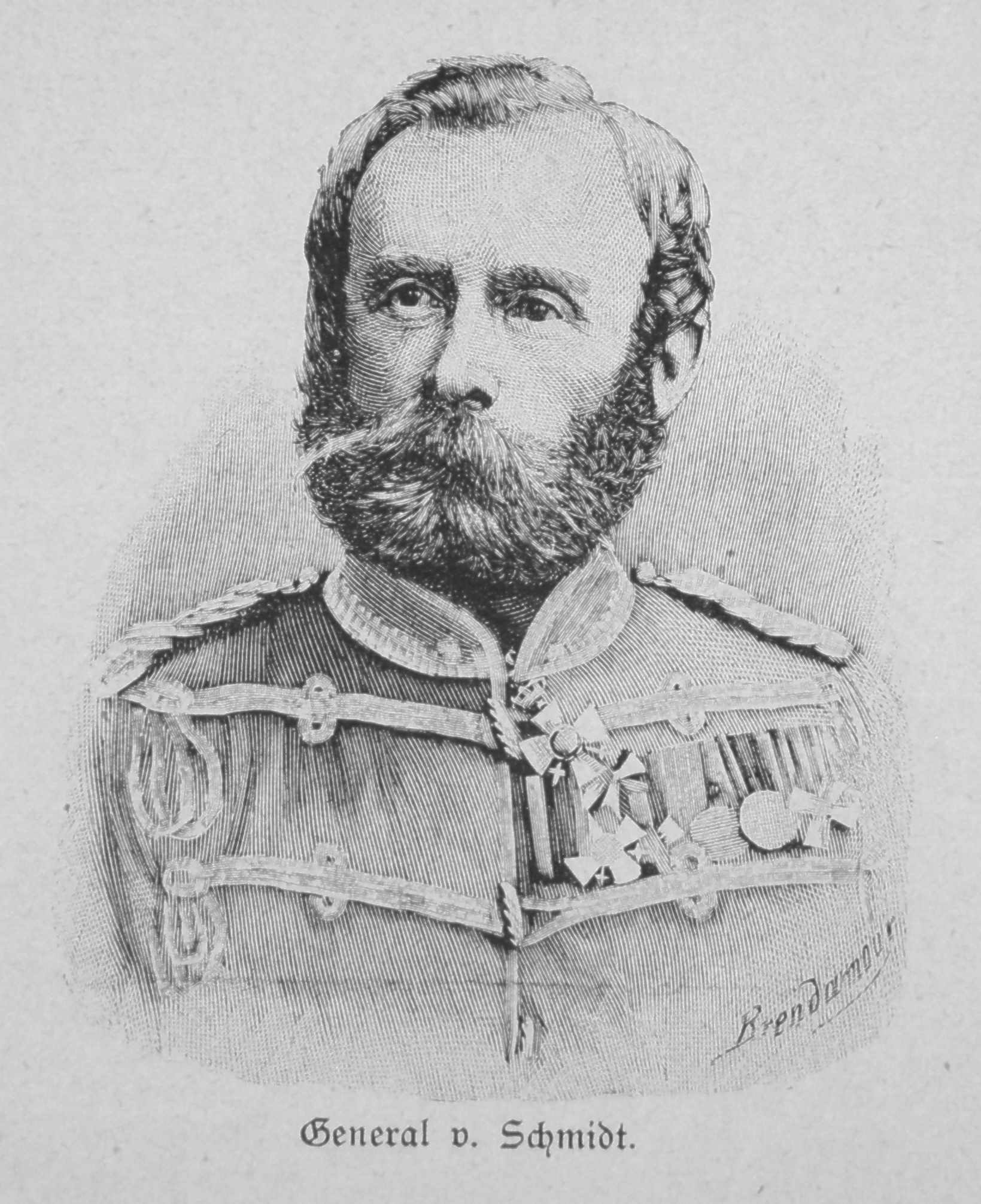
General von Schmidt

- Heinrich Schmelka (1777–1837), stage actor
- Leonhardt von Blumenthal (1810–1900), Prussian Field Marshal
- Karl von Schmidt (1817–1875), Prussian cavalry commander
- Paul von Hintze (1864–1941), naval officer, diplomat and politician
- Max Lemke (1895–1985), officer, Major-General last in World War II
- Heinz von Cleve (1897–1984), actor
- Horst Wendlandt (1922–2002), film producer
- Jörg Hoffmann (born 1970), freestyle swimmer
- Britta Steffen (born 1983), freestyle swimmer
