= Weiden in der Oberpfalz =

- Town
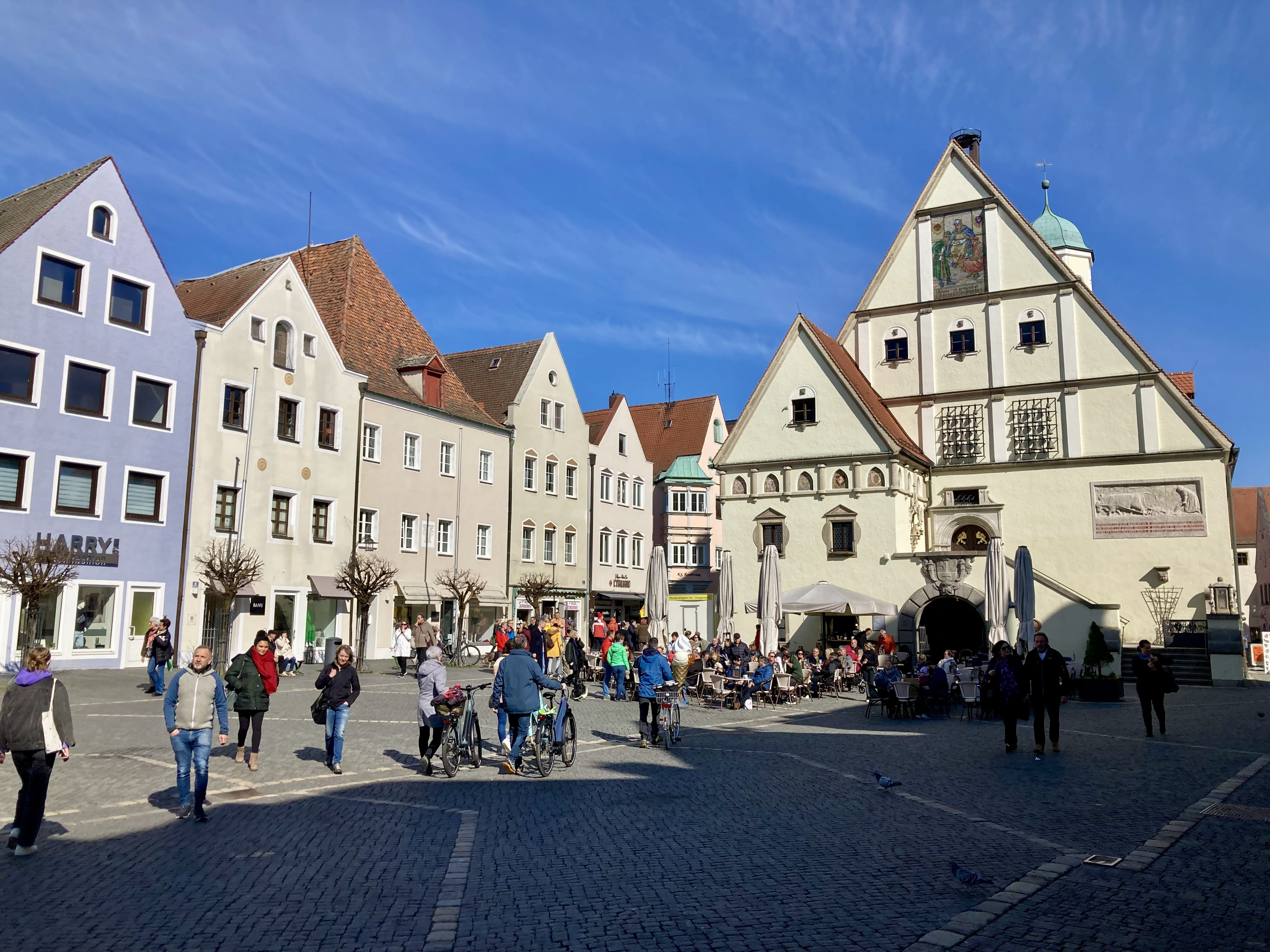
- Weiden Altstadt with Rathaus (right). Weiden in der Oberpfalz, Germany

- Flag Coat of arms
- Interactive map of Weiden in der Oberpfalz
- Location within Germany Location within Bavaria
- Coordinates: 49°40′N 12°09′E
- Country: Germany
- State: Bavaria
- Admin. region: Upper Palatinate
- District: Urban district

Government
  - Mayor (2020–26): Benjamin Zeitler (CSU)

Area
  - Total: 70.57 km^{2} (27.25 sq mi)
- Elevation: 397 m (1,302 ft)

Population (2025-12-31)
  - Total: 42,453
  - Density: 601.6/km^{2} (1,558/sq mi)
- Time zone: UTC+01:00 (CET)
  - Summer (DST): UTC+02:00 (CEST)
- Postal codes: 92637
- Dialling codes: 0961
- Vehicle registration: WEN
- Website: www.weiden.de

Weiden in der Oberpfalz (German pronunciation: [ˈvaɪdn̩ ʔɪn deːɐ̯ ˈʔoːbɐˌpfalts], lit. 'Weiden in the Upper Palatinate'; official abbreviation: Weiden i.d.OPf.; Northern Bavarian: Weidn in da Owapfalz) is a district-free town in Bavaria, Germany. It is located 100 km (62 mi) east of Nuremberg and 35 km (22 mi) west of the Czech border. Weiden is the second biggest town in the governmental district Oberpfalz after Regensburg. A branch of the German Army is located here.

== History ==
Weiden in der Oberpfalz was first mentioned in a document in 1241 as Weiden. It is assumed that the first settlements in Weiden date back to the year 1000. Located at the intersection of two major trading routes (Goldene Strasse and Magdeburger Strasse), Weiden soon became an important trading centre with a population of 2,200 in 1531. Two big fires, the Thirty Years' War and the Plague were major setbacks for the town, which it did not recover from until the end of the 18th century. Between 1634 and 1635 and 1648 and 1650, Weiden was occupied by Swedish troops. From 1714, the town belonged to the Duchy of Palatine-Sulzbach. An economic boom occurred in 1863 when Weiden was connected to the railroad network. With the settlement of important glass and porcelain companies, the population increased. Around the turn of the century, it was already close to 10,000.

On 1 January 1919, the town became district-free by decree of the first Republican Prime Minister, Kurt Eisner (USPD)

== Districts ==
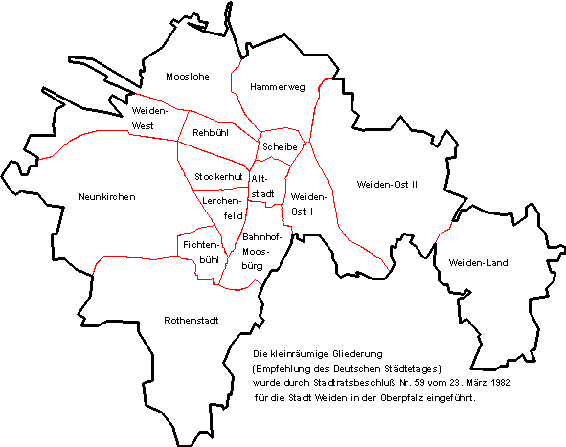
Districts of Weiden in der Oberpfalz

Nr.	District	Area (km^{2})	Population	Remarks	Population density (People per km^{2})
01	Altstadt	0.98	3,943	Southern old town with historic city center	4023
02	Scheibe	0.86	2,296	Northern old town	2669
03	Hammerweg	4.32	5,559		1286
04	Weiden-Ost II	10.45	2,829	with Tröglersricht, Zollhaus, Almesbach	270
05	Weiden-Ost I	3.14	2,490		792
06	Bahnhof-Moosbürg	2.55	1,466		574
07	Fichtenbühl	1.27	1,192	with Ermersricht	938
08	Stockerhut	1.80	3,953		2196
09	Lerchenfeld	1.45	4,459		3075
10	Weiden-West	5.03	2,062	with Brandweiher	409
11	Rehbühl	1.53	6,538		4273
12	Mooslohe	5.50	3,559	with Moosöd	647
13	Neunkirchen	11.50	1,718	with Frauenricht, Latsch, Halmesricht, Spitalöd, Wiesendorf	149
14	Rothenstadt	11.73	3,145	with Ullersricht, Neubau, Maierhof, Mallersricht, Mallersricht-Ziegelhütte	268
15	Weiden-Land	8.43	235	with Muglhof, Matzlesrieth, Unterhöll, Mitterhöll, Trauschendorf, Oedenthal	27

== Incorporations into Weiden in der Oberpfalz ==
On 1 January 1914, the municipality of Moosbürg was incorporated with Moosbürg, Ermersricht, Fichtenbühl and Leihstadtmühle. Tröglersricht and Zollhaus from the former municipality of Edeldorf followed on 1 February 1915.

The following districts were incorporated on 1 July 1972:

- Municipality of Frauenricht with Frauenricht, Halmesricht, Latsch and Spitalöd
- Municipality of Muglhof with Muglhof, Mitterhöll, Unterhöll, Oedenthal and Trauschendorf
- Municipality of Neunkirchen bei Weiden with Neunkirchen, Brandweiher and Wiesendorf
- Municipality of Rothenstadt with Rothenstadt and Mallersricht

On 1 May 1978 the following districts were added to the existing municipalities:

- Matzlesrieth; added to the municipality of Muglhof
- Maierhof, Neubau, Ullersricht and Moodöd; added to the municipality of Rothenstadt

== Main sights ==
=== Historical buildings ===
- St. Josef, a Catholic church, built between 1899 and 1900, Neo Romanesque style with Art Nouveau interior.
- Marktplatz, the market square stretched between the Upper and Lower Gates with numerous renaissance buildings.
- Altes Rathaus ("Old Town Hall"), built between 1539 and 1545 by Hans Nopl.
- St. Michael, a Protestant church rebuilt several times. The church got its present baroque appearance from 1627, the tower from 1761.
- Alte Stadtmauer, partially preserved old town walls from the 14th century.
- St. Sebastian, a Catholic chapel, built around 1480.

=== Museums ===
- International Ceramic Museum
- City Museum - exhibits art, furniture and porcelain from the early 16th century to the 19th century. There is a room dedicated to composer Max Reger, who lived and studied in Weiden.

== Economy and infrastructure ==
=== Overview ===
In the year 2016, Weiden, within the city limits, reached a GDP of 2.272 Billion € and a GDP per capita of €53.734 . (Bavaria: 44.215€/ Germany: 38.180€) Therefore it was significantly higher than average. In 2017 there were about 41,800 employed people in the town. The rate of unemployment in 2018 stood at 5.3% and therefore significantly higher than the Bavarian average of 2.7%.

=== Economic structure ===
Today, about 42,000 people live in Weiden, spanning n area of 70.5 km^{2} / 27.2 mi^{2}. Weiden was never a typical industrial town; in 2015 only a fifth of all 26,567 employees subject to social security worked in the manufacturing sector, meanwhile more than ¾ were working in the service sector.

Since the end of the 20th century, industry and trade changed a lot. The monostructure of glass and porcelain with companies like Bauscher, Seltmann and Nachtmann, who still play a big role in the manufacturing sector, was dismantled and supplemented by vehicle construction, plastics processing and microelectronics companies.

A structural change is reflected in the huge job cuts seen in the glass and porcelain industry, which is why Weiden suffers from persistently high rates of unemployment.

=== Traffic ===
==== Highways ====
- Bundesautobahnen:
  - A93: Autobahndreieck Hochfranken - Hof - Weiden - Schwandorf - Regensburg - Wolnzach - Autobahndreieck Holledau
- Bundesstraßen:
  - B22: Würzburg - Bayreuth - Weiden - Cham
  - B470: Bad Windsheim - Forchheim - Auerbach i.d.OPf. - Weiden

==== Public transit ====
The city buses are operated by the company Wies. There are 7 bus lines in regular traffic (Line 1-7) and 6 bus lines in light traffic (91-95, 98), that all meet at the Central Bus Station next to the town hall. The regular traffic (in which buses drive every 15–30 minutes) applies every Monday to Friday between 6:00 and 18:15. Before 6:00 and after 18:15, as well as on Saturdays, Sundays and national holidays the light traffic (with buses every 40 minutes) applies.

Next to the citybuses, there are intercity buses operated by the Regionalbus Ostbayern GmbH (RBO), a daughter company of the Deutsche Bahn. They drive into the surrounding cities and villages and meet at the cities' train station

Ticket prices are regulated by the Tarif Oberpfalz Nord (TON). The Nahverkehrsgemeinschaft Weiden-Neustadt (NWN) has joined the TON as well, creating one unified system for the northern part of the Oberpfalz

== Twin towns – sister cities ==
Weiden in der Oberpfalz is twinned with:

- Issy-les-Moulineaux, France (1962)
- Macerata, Italy (1963)
- Weiden am See, Austria (1990)
- Annaberg-Buchholz, Germany (1990)
- Mariánské Lázně, Czech Republic (2008)

== Geography ==
=== Climate ===
This area is characterized by equable climates with few extremes of temperature and ample precipitation in all months. The Köppen Climate Classification subtype for this climate is "Cfb". (Marine West Coast Climate).

Climate data for Weiden in der Oberpfalz (1991–2020 normals)
Month	Jan	Feb	Mar	Apr	May	Jun	Jul	Aug	Sep	Oct	Nov	Dec	Year
Mean daily maximum °C (°F)	1.9 (35.4)	3.7 (38.7)	8.5 (47.3)	14.3 (57.7)	18.8 (65.8)	22.2 (72.0)	24.2 (75.6)	24.0 (75.2)	18.7 (65.7)	12.8 (55.0)	6.3 (43.3)	2.5 (36.5)	13.2 (55.8)
Daily mean °C (°F)	−0.6 (30.9)	0.2 (32.4)	4.0 (39.2)	8.7 (47.7)	13.2 (55.8)	16.5 (61.7)	18.3 (64.9)	18.0 (64.4)	13.3 (55.9)	8.5 (47.3)	3.6 (38.5)	0.3 (32.5)	8.7 (47.7)
Mean daily minimum °C (°F)	−3.2 (26.2)	−3.1 (26.4)	−0.2 (31.6)	3.2 (37.8)	7.3 (45.1)	10.6 (51.1)	12.5 (54.5)	12.1 (53.8)	8.3 (46.9)	4.7 (40.5)	1.0 (33.8)	−2 (28)	4.3 (39.7)
Average precipitation mm (inches)	52.7 (2.07)	39.8 (1.57)	47.1 (1.85)	36.7 (1.44)	66.5 (2.62)	81.1 (3.19)	80.5 (3.17)	70.1 (2.76)	57.9 (2.28)	54.8 (2.16)	52.8 (2.08)	59.5 (2.34)	701.5 (27.62)
Average precipitation days (≥ 1.0 mm)	16.6	14.6	15.1	12.4	14.2	14.3	15.4	12.6	12.7	14.9	15.6	18.2	176.7
Average snowy days (≥ 1.0 cm)	12.8	12.9	5.1	0.2	0	0	0	0	0	0	3.2	8.4	42.6
Average relative humidity (%)	86.8	82.1	76.4	69.0	69.3	69.7	69.3	70.7	78.2	84.3	89.1	89.5	77.9
Mean monthly sunshine hours	45.7	75.3	120.3	179.2	206.4	208.8	225.2	217.3	157.7	104.7	45.1	33.5	1,619.2
Source: World Meteorological Organization

== Notable people ==
- Erhard Weigel (1625–1699), astronomer and mathematician
- Franz Ferdinand von Rummel (1644–1716), Prince-Bishop in Vienna
- Max Reger (1873–1916), composer and organist
- Eduard Zintl (1898–1941), chemist
- Otto Ambros (1901–1990), chemist and a Nazi war criminal
- Martin Gottfried Weiss (1905–1946), SS Commander of German concentration camps executed for war crimes
- Elisabeth Schärtel (1919–2012), mezzo-soprano
- Erich Bäumler (1930–2003), footballer
- Marga Schiml (born 1945), opera singer
- Monika Henzinger (born 1966), computer scientist
- Michael Brenner (born 1964), historian
- Benedikt Schopper (born 1985), ice hockey player
- Sandro Schoenberger (born 1987), professional ice hockey player
- Nadine Kraus (born 1988), footballer
- Sven Kopp (born 1995), footballer
- Dennis Lippert (born 1996), footballer

== See also ==
=== Important glass and porcellain companies in Weiden ===
- Bauscher
- Seltmann Weiden
- Nachtmann
