= St. Michael, Weiden =

Lutheran church in Bavaria

Coordinates: 49°40′31″N 12°09′44″E

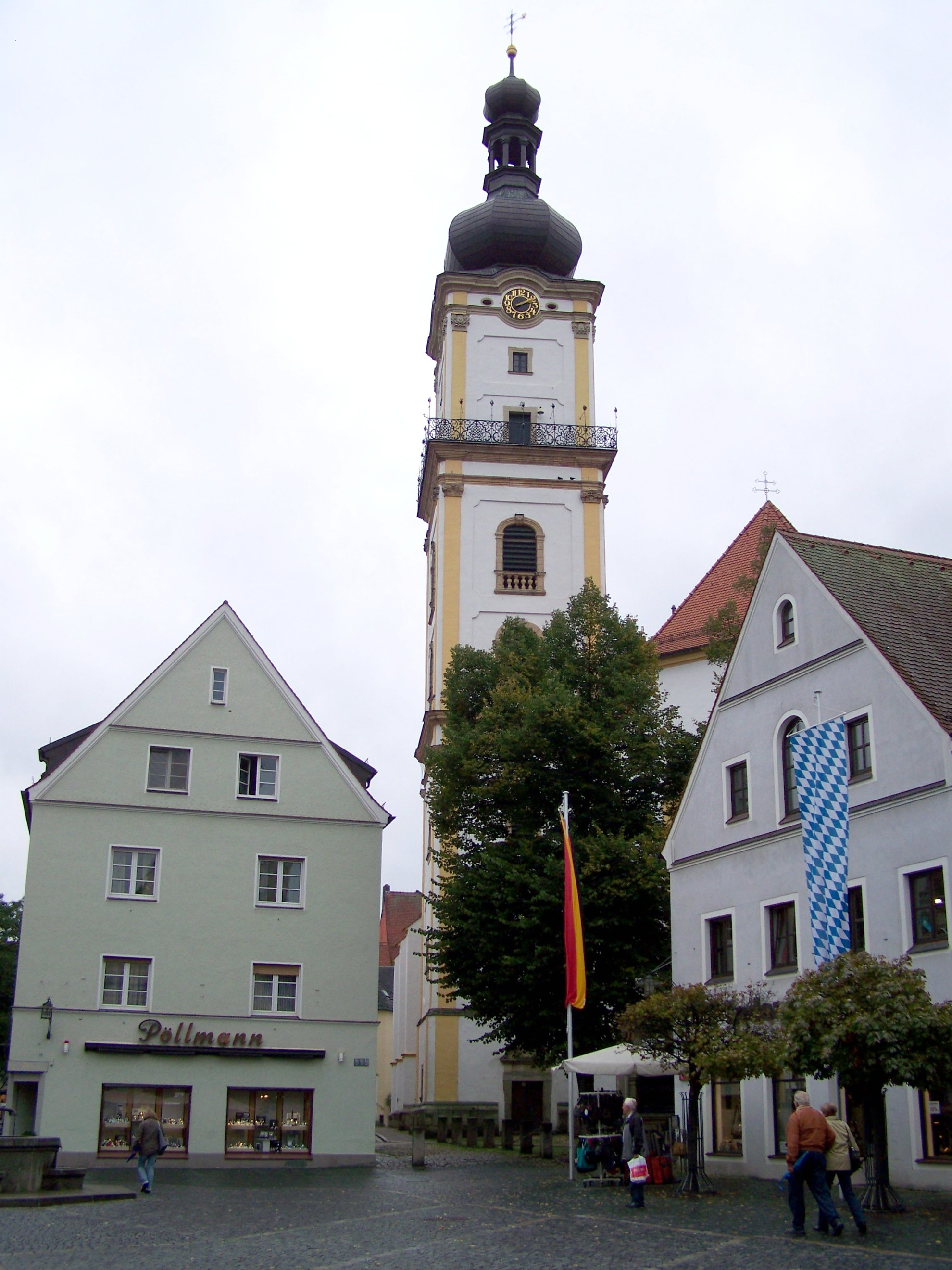
St. Michael

St. Michael is a Lutheran church and parish in Weiden in der Oberpfalz, Bavaria, Germany. It belongs to the congregation of St. Michael Weiden in the Weiden Dekanat of the Evangelical-Lutheran Church in Bavaria. It has served both Catholic and Protestant communities during its history and was used as a church for both confessions until 1899. Today, its known for its association with the organist Max Reger.

== History ==
The church was first mentioned in 1341 when King John of Bohemia transferred the right of appointment to the Waldsassen Abbey. In 2005, excavations revealed that the original building was likely constructed in the 12th or 13th century, and a hall church was newly built around 1300. However, it was destroyed by fire in 1396. In 1415, the choir was rebuilt with flanking towers, but the northern tower was never finished. After another destruction in 1421, the nave was reconstructed as a stepped hall between 1448 and 1460, as evidenced by an updated inscription from 1448. The church was consecrated in 1469, and it was an independent parish after 1481. The first Protestant pastor was recorded in 1535.

Following further fires in 1536 and 1540, the church was repaired and largely rebuilt in 1564, as indicated by a construction inscription behind the organ. The tower was renewed in 1576. Unfortunately, the tower collapsed in March 1759, causing damage to the southern choir wall and eastern vaulting bays. The reconstruction was finally completed in 1763 by master builder Georg Dobmayer from Kaltenbrunn.

In 1627, the Jesuits took over the church during the recatholicization period, and it was simultaneously used by both confessions from 1633 to 1899. Some slight traces of this era can still be found today. To the right and left of the altar, a rotating mechanism is integrated. The doors remained closed during Protestant services, while they were opened during Catholic services, and Catholic saint figures were placed in the resulting niches. During the simultaneous use, the church had two sextons, two pastors, two clock winders, and two tower guards with two apprentices each for ringing the bells, due to parity. The occupation changed every 14 days, so that both confessions had equal rights to the church.

The church underwent extensive renovations from 1899 to 1907, followed by a restoration from 1976 to 1979, and another renovation in 2005. Notably, Max Reger worked as an organist at this church from 1883 to 1889.
