= Schönburg =

Schönburg may refer to:

- Schönburg Castle, a castle in Schönburg (Saale) near Naumburg, Sachsen-Anhalt
- Schönburg (Rhine), a castle in Oberwesel, Rheinland-Pfalz
- Schönburg (Saale), is a municipality in the Burgenlandkreis district, in Saxony-Anhalt
- Schönburg family
  - Schönburg-Glauchau
    - Alban von Schönburg-Forderglauchau, German aristocart
    - Alexander, Count of Schönburg-Glauchau, German journalist and author
    - Beatrix, Countess of Schönburg-Glauchau (1930–2021), Hungarian-German aristocrat
    - Countess Gloria von Schönburg-Glauchau
    - Joachim, Count of Schönburg-Glauchau, German journalist
    - Countess Maya von Schönburg-Glauchau (1958–2019), German socialite
  - Schönburg-Hartenstein
    - Alois Schönburg-Hartenstein (1858–1944), Austrian politician and military officer
  - Schönburg-Waldenburg
    - Princess Anna Louise of Schönburg-Waldenburg (1871–1951), Princess consort of Schwarzburg-Rudolstadt and Schwarzburg-Sondershausen
    - Princess Mathilde of Schönburg-Waldenburg
    - Sophie of Schönburg-Waldenburg

== See also ==
- Schönberg
