= Johannes van der Kemp =

Dutch missionary and social reformer

Reverend Johannes Van der Kemp MD
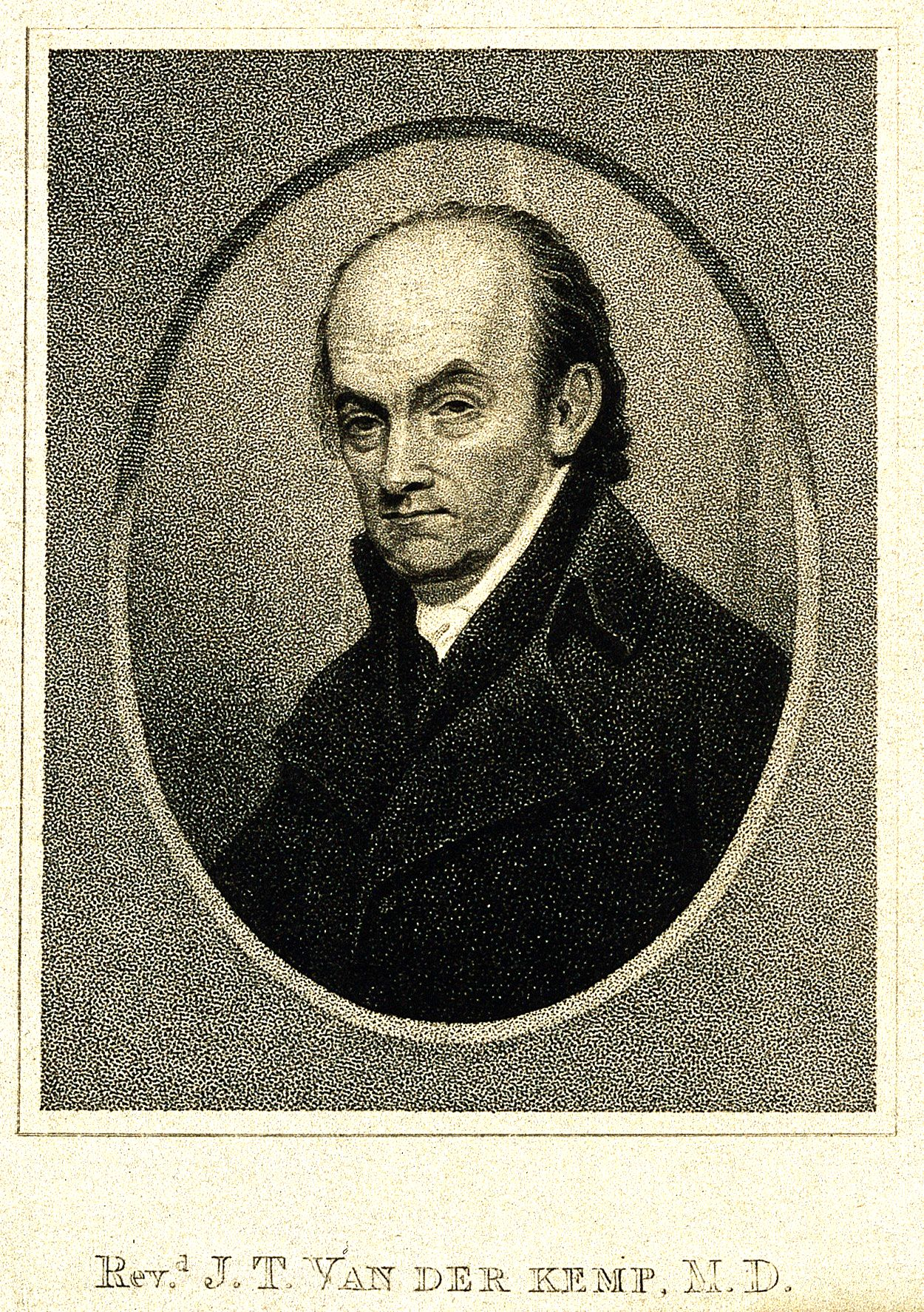
- Johannes van der Kemp, 1799 stipple engraving by William Ridley (1764– 1838).
- Born: Johannes Theodorus Van der Kemp; 17 May 1747; Rotterdam, Netherlands
- Died: 15 December 1811 (aged 64); Cape Town, Cape Colony
- Occupation: Missionary
- Spouses: Christina Helena Frank (m. 1779–d. 1791); Sara Jans Van de Caep (m. 1791–1811)
- Children: 5 in total, only 3 made it to adulthood
- Parent(s): Cornelius Jansz Van der Kemp; Anna Maria Van Teylingen
- Relatives: Didericus Van der Kemp, brother, lecturer at Rector Magnificus University (Leiden)

Dr Johannes Theodorus van der Kemp (17 May 1747 in Rotterdam – 15 December 1811 in Cape Town) was a military officer, doctor, and philosopher who became a missionary in South Africa.

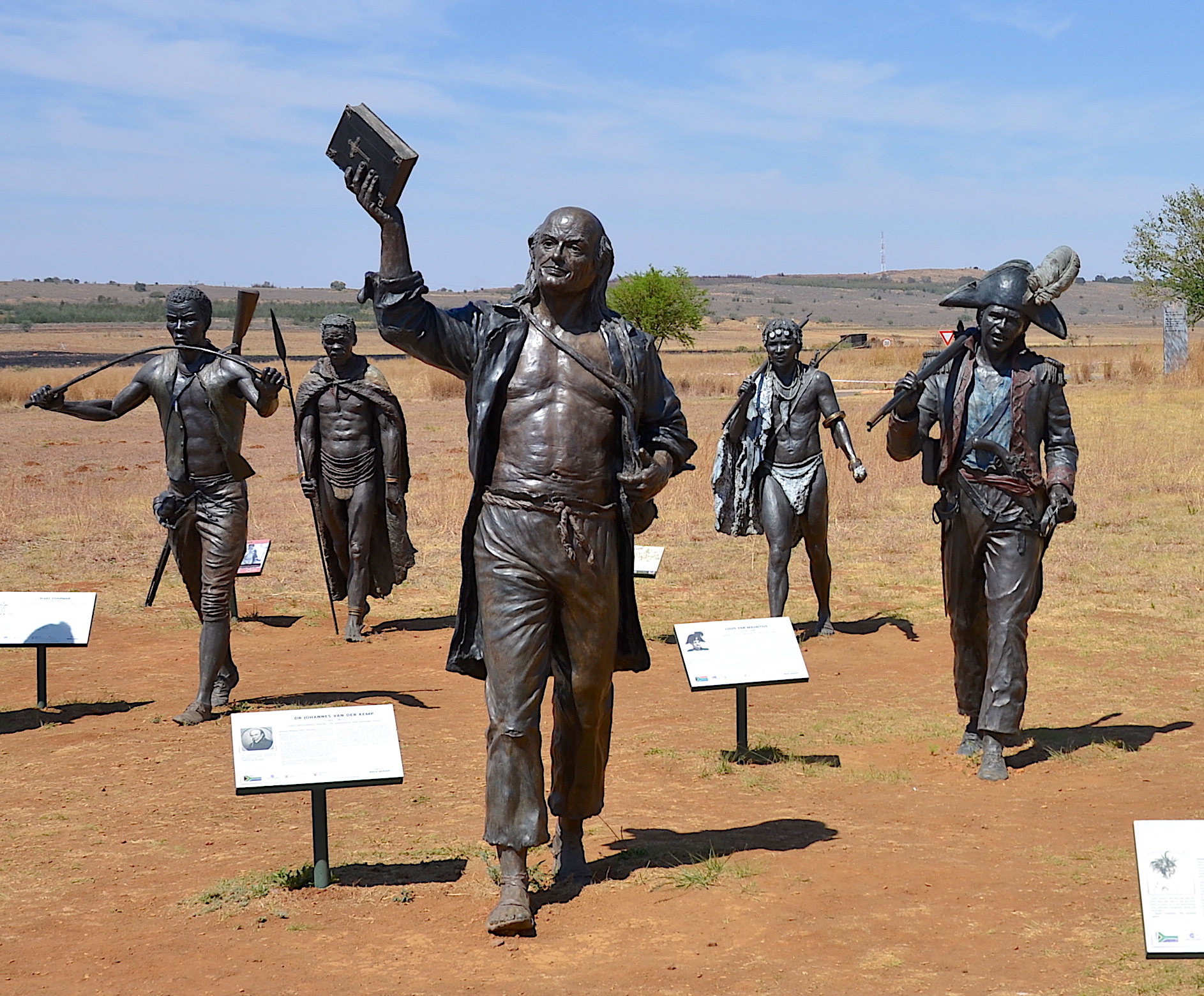
Bronze Statue of Johannes van der Kemp at Maropeng (Exhibition Long March to Freedom)

== Early life ==
The second son of Cornelius van der Kemp, a minister and Rotterdam's leading reformed clergyman, and Anna Maria van Teylingen, he attended the Latin schools of Rotterdam and Dordrecht. He subsequently enrolled at the University of Leiden in 1763 where he studied medicine, but when his elder brother Didericus was appointed as professor of church history he abandoned his studies. At an early age he attended the University of Leiden, where he progressed rapidly, and where his brother was later a professor of divinity.

== Army career ==
Soon after college van der Kemp joined the Dragoon Guards rank of Captain of Horse and a Lieutenant of the Dragoon Guards. Ignoring his religious principles, he fathered an illegitimate child, Johanna ("Antje"), an affair to which he described as being “the slave of vice and ungodliness”, and afterwards brought up his child himself. In 1778 he fell in love with Christina ("Stijntje") Frank (d. 1791). He lived with her for a year before being reprimanded by the Prince of Orange on this irregular state of affairs. As a result, he both married Stijntje, on 29 May 1779, and quit the army after serving for sixteen years.

== Return to medicine ==
Returning to his medical studies, this time in Edinburgh, he completed his Medical Doctorate within two years. He also prepared for publication a treatise in Latin on cosmology, entitled Parmenides, which was published in 1781. He returned to the Netherlands, where he practised as a doctor first in Middelburg and then near Dordrecht. On 27 June 1791, his wife and daughter Antje were drowned in a yachting accident from which he only just escaped. As a result of this incident, he experienced an emotional conversion back to the reformed Christianity of his family.

He served as a medical officer during the revolutionary campaigns in Flanders and then as hospital superintendent at Zwijndrecht, near Dordrecht. While there in 1797, he came to hear of the formation of the London Missionary Society.

== Missionary work ==
After making contact with the London Missionary Society, he helped found the Dutch version Nederlandsche Zendinggenootschap. He was ordained in London in November 1798 and began recruiting men for the society. He sailed from London in December 1798 as one of the first three agents sent by the society to Cape, arriving in March 1799.

Whilst there in 1799 he published the first work in book-form in South Africa, which was an 8-page translation, into Dutch, of the London Missionary Society's letter that he brought out to the inhabitants of the Cape. Printed by V.A. Schoonberg most likely on J.C. Ritters press.

Once in South Africa, after working at Gaika's Kraal near King William's Town he journeyed beyond the eastern frontier of the colony to work among the Xhosa under Chief Ngqika. From the Xhosa he received the name Jank' hanna (‘the bald man’). War between Cape Colony and the Xhosa soon drove him back and from 1801 onwards he worked exclusively within the colony, mainly with dispossessed Hottentots. In 1803 he established a mission settlement for vagrant Hottentots at Bethelsdorp where local farmers accused him of harboring lawless elements. He countered with a list of alleged ill-treatment of the Hottentots by local farmers, but the evidence proved unsatisfactory and the farmers were acquitted.

On 7 April 1806 he married Sara Janse, a freed slave 45 years his junior, and had four children with her. This situation and his attitudes caused great opposition from within the colony, and he was for a time ordered by the government to leave Bethelsdorp.

Armed with a background in European and classical philology, he pioneered in the study of Xhosa and Khoikhoi languages.

He was recalled to Cape Town by the Governor in 1811 and died soon afterwards.

An early van der Kemp biographer Author D. Martin, notes that van der Kemp was often criticized by contemporary historians for his favoring of the natives of South Africa.

== In print ==
Sarah Millin, one of the most popular English-language novelists in South Africa during her lifetime wrote The Burning Man about the life of van der Kemp. The life of Johannes van der Kemp during his mission in Bethelsdorp is included in the novel Praying Mantis by André Brink.

== See also ==
- Robert Moffat (missionary) (1795-1883) — 19th century Missionary in South Africa who also translated native languages.

== Sources ==
- Martin, Arthur Davis (1931). Doctor VanderKemp. Westminister: Livingstone Press.
- van der Kemp, Johannes (1812). Memoir of the Rev. J. T. Van der Kemp, M.D. late missionary in South Africa. London: Printed for the Society, by J. Dennett, and sold by Williams and Son.
