= Berkholz-Meyenburg =

- Ortsteil of Schwedt
- Interactive map of Berkholz-Meyenburg
- Location within Germany Location within Brandenburg
- Coordinates: 53°03′N 14°14′E
- Country: Germany
- State: Brandenburg
- District: Uckermark
- Town: Schwedt

Area
  - Total: 11.76 km^{2} (4.54 sq mi)
- Elevation: 25 m (82 ft)

Population (2020-12-31)
  - Total: 1,256
  - Density: 106.8/km^{2} (276.6/sq mi)
- Time zone: UTC+01:00 (CET)
  - Summer (DST): UTC+02:00 (CEST)
- Postal codes: 16306
- Dialling codes: 03332

Berkholz-Meyenburg (German pronunciation: [ˈbɛʁkhɔlts ˈmaɪənbʊʁk]) is a former municipality in the Uckermark district, in Brandenburg, Germany. Since 19 April 2022, it is an Ortsteil of the town Schwedt.

== Demography ==
Development of Population since 1875 within the Current Boundaries (Blue Line: Population; Dotted Line: Comparison to Population Development of Brandenburg state; Grey Background: Time of Nazi rule; Red Background: Time of Communist rule)

Berkholz-Meyenburg: Population development
within the current boundaries (2017)

Year	Pop.	±% p.a.
1875	556	—
1890	465	−1.18%
1910	428	−0.41%
1925	471	+0.64%
1933	424	−1.31%
1939	430	+0.23%
1946	689	+6.97%
1950	735	+1.63%
1964	514	−2.52%
1971	508	−0.17%
1981	379	−2.89%
1985	365	−0.94%
1989	348	−1.19%
1990	340	−2.30%

Year	Pop.	±% p.a.
1991	335	−1.47%
1992	366	+9.25%
1993	421	+15.03%
1994	602	+42.99%
1995	751	+24.75%
1996	832	+10.79%
1997	922	+10.82%
1998	1,001	+8.57%
1999	1,048	+4.70%
2000	1,129	+7.73%
2001	1,182	+4.69%
2002	1,208	+2.20%
2003	1,214	+0.50%
2004	1,212	−0.16%

Year	Pop.	±% p.a.
2005	1,221	+0.74%
2006	1,245	+1.97%
2007	1,266	+1.69%
2008	1,260	−0.47%
2009	1,257	−0.24%
2010	1,279	+1.75%
2011	1,279	+0.00%
2012	1,266	−1.02%
2013	1,268	+0.16%
2014	1,289	+1.66%
2015	1,257	−2.48%
2016	1,254	−0.24%
2017	1,226	−2.23%
