= David A. Scheinberg =

American physician-scientist

- Education: Cornell University BA Johns Hopkins University School of Medicine MD, PhD
- Medical career
- Profession: Physician-scientist
- Institutions: Memorial Sloan Kettering Cancer Center; Weill Cornell Medicine
- Sub-specialties: Leukemia

David A. Scheinberg is an American physician, scientist, drug developer, and entrepreneur, who is Vincent Astor Chair, Chair of the Center for Experimental Therapeutics and former Chair of the Molecular Pharmacology Program at Memorial Sloan Kettering Cancer Center (MSK). He is a pioneer and inventor of targeted alpha particle therapies and alpha particle generators for use in patients with cancer.

== Career ==
Scheinberg received a BA from Cornell University and an MD, PhD from Johns Hopkins University School of Medicine. He is a professor of pharmacology and former co-chair of the pharmacology graduate program at Weill Cornell Graduate School of Medical Sciences and a professor at the Gerstner Sloan Kettering Graduate School. He also founded and chairs the Experimental Therapeutics Center and formerly the Nanotechnology Center at MSK. He is a founding director of the Tri-Institutional Therapeutics Discovery Institute of MSK, Weill Cornell Medicine, and Rockefeller University, as well as Break Through Cancer of MSK, Dana Farber Cancer Institute, MD Anderson Cancer Center, Sidney Kimmel Comprehensive Cancer Center, and the Koch Institute for Integrative Cancer Research.

In 2013 Nature Biotechnology recognized him as one of the top 20 Translational Scientists in the world. Scheinberg has published more than 350 papers, chapters, or books and has more than 40 patents.

His laboratory studies cancer immunology, cellular engineering, cancer vaccines, T cell receptor mimic antibodies, and targeted nano-machines.

== Memberships ==
- American Society of Clinical Investigation (ASCI)
- Association of American Physicians (AAP)
- Interurban Clinical Club

== Awards and recognition ==
- Doris Duke Distinguished Clinical Science Professorship
- 2012: Emil J. Freireich Award
