= Schöneberg, Brandenburg =

Schöneberg
- Ortsteil of Schwedt
- Interactive map of Schöneberg
- Location within Germany Location within Brandenburg
- Coordinates: 53°00′00″N 14°08′00″E
- Country: Germany
- State: Brandenburg
- District: Uckermark
- Town: Schwedt

Area
  - Total: 46.62 km^{2} (18.00 sq mi)
- Elevation: 65 m (213 ft)

Population (2019-12-31)
  - Total: 803
  - Density: 17.2/km^{2} (44.6/sq mi)
- Time zone: UTC+01:00 (CET)
  - Summer (DST): UTC+02:00 (CEST)
- Postal codes: 16278, 16303
- Dialling codes: 033338, 033335
- Vehicle registration: UM
- Website: www.amt-oder-welse.de

Schöneberg (German: [ˈʃøːnəbɛʁk]) is a village and a former municipality in the Uckermark district, in Brandenburg, Germany. Since January 2021 it is part of the city of Schwedt/Oder.

== Demography ==
Development of population since 1875 within the final boundaries (Blue line: Population; Dotted line: Comparison to population development of Brandenburg state; Grey background: Time of Nazi rule; Red background: Time of communist rule)

Schöneberg [Uckermark]: Population development
within the final boundaries (2020)

Year	Pop.	±% p.a.
1875	1,301	—
1890	1,197	−0.55%
1910	1,268	+0.29%
1925	1,436	+0.83%
1933	1,192	−2.30%
1939	1,122	−1.00%
1946	1,290	+2.01%
1950	1,329	+0.75%
1964	1,230	−0.55%
1971	1,183	−0.56%
1981	903	−2.66%
1985	840	−1.79%
1989	812	−0.84%
1990	813	+0.12%
1991	812	−0.12%

Year	Pop.	±% p.a.
1992	843	+3.82%
1993	882	+4.63%
1994	871	−1.25%
1995	905	+3.90%
1996	939	+3.76%
1997	938	−0.11%
1998	950	+1.28%
1999	1,010	+6.32%
2000	992	−1.78%
2001	1,001	+0.91%
2002	995	−0.60%
2003	975	−2.01%
2004	940	−3.59%
2005	924	−1.70%
2006	878	−4.98%

Year	Pop.	±% p.a.
2007	860	−2.05%
2008	851	−1.05%
2009	844	−0.82%
2010	852	+0.95%
2011	853	+0.12%
2012	863	+1.17%
2013	876	+1.51%
2014	865	−1.26%
2015	851	−1.62%
2016	840	−1.29%
2017	811	−3.45%
2018	810	−0.12%
2019	803	−0.86%
2020	756	−5.85%
