= Guido Schoenberger =

Guido Leopold Schoenberger (born February 26, 1891, in Frankfurt am Main; died August 20, 1974, in Queens, New York City) was a German-American art historian.

== Life ==
Guido Schönberger's father Jakob Schönberger was a merchant from Ermreuth; his mother Pauline Mayer came from Germersheim. Schönberger attended the Adlerflychtschule and the Goethe-Gymnasium in Frankfurt and from 1909 studied history and art history in Freiburg im Breisgau and Berlin. He became a soldier in the First World War in 1914 and completed his doctoral examination at the University of Freiburg under Georg von Below during a holiday in March 1917. From 1918 he worked as an assistant at the Institute of Art History at the University of Frankfurt.

Schönberger married Martha Kaufmann in 1923 and they had two children. He habilitated in 1926 under Rudolf Kautzsch at the University of Frankfurt and was appointed Privatdozent.

From 1928 Schönberger had a permanent job as curator of the Historical Museum, Frankfurt. After the transfer of power to the Nazis in 1933, he was dismissed on racist grounds, but the dismissal was revoked because of his status as a front-line fighter (Frontkämpferprivileg). After the enactment of the Nuremberg Laws in 1935, Schönberger was dismissed at the turn of the year. He was dismissed on the basis of § 18 of the Reichs-Habilitationsordnung of 13 December 1934, which stated that lecturers could be deprived of their teaching license or restricted "if it is required in the interest of the university".

From 1936 Schoenberger found volunteer employment at the Museum of Jewish Antiquities. After the Kristallnacht pogrom in 1938, he was imprisoned in the Buchenwald concentration camp. After his release from prison in 1939, he fled with his family to New York, where he found work as a research assistant at the New York University Institute of Fine Arts, financed by a scholarship. As a lecturer, he lectured there from 1941 and also read at the Metropolitan Museum of Art. From 1947 Schoenberger was a research fellow at the newly founded Jewish Museum in New York and, from 1947 until his retirement in 1961, adjunct professor and lecturer at the NYU Institute of Fine Arts.

Schoenberger interrupted his activities in New York in 1951 to work in the American occupation zone in Germany on behalf of the restitution organization Jewish Cultural Reconstruction, Inc. (JCR), the cultural arm of the Jewish Restitution Successor Organization (IRSO). He was involved in the seizure of confiscated Jewish cultural assets (Judaica) and in Frankfurt he was primarily involved in tracking down objects from the holdings of the Historical Museum that were to be returned to foreign museums.

== Selected writings ==
- Das Geleitswesen der Reichsstadt Frankfurt a. M. im 14. und 15. Jahrhundert ("The escort system of the imperial city of Frankfurt am Main in the 14th and 15th centuries"). Dissertation Freiburg, 1917
- Beiträge zur Baugeschichte des Frankfurter Doms [Contributions to the architectural history of the Frankfurt Cathedral] (in German). Frankfurt a. M.: Historisches Museum. 1927.
- Bibliographie der wissenschaftlichen Veröffentlichungen von Rudolf Kautzsch [Bibliography of the scientific publications of Rudolf Kautzsh] (in German). Frankfurt a. M.: Frankf. Bibliophilen-Gesellsch. 1928.
- Der Frankfurter Dom St. Bartholomäus / 1. Das Bauwerk in seiner entwicklungsgeschichtlichen Bedeutung [St. Bartholomew's Cathedral in Frankfurt / 1. The building in its developmental significance] (in German). Koblenz: Rheinische Verlagsgesellschaft. 1929.
- with Heinrich Bingemer: Bauten und Landschaft in Hessen und Nassau [Buildings and landscape in Hesse and Nassau] (in German). Frankfurt a. M.: Frankfurter Kunstverein. 1930.
- with Hermann Gundersheimer: Frankfurter Chanukkaleuchter in Silber und Zinn ("Frankfurt Hanukkah candlestick in silver and tin") (= Notizblatt der Gesellschaft zur Erforschung jüdischer Kunstdenkmäler 34). Frankfurt a. M.: Gesellschaft z. Erforschg jüdischer Kunstdenkmäler, 1937
- The Drawings of Mathis Gothart Nithart, Called Grünewald. New York: Bittner. 1948.
- with Stephen Sally Kayser (ed.): Jewish Ceremonial Art. 1955.

== Bibliography ==
- Röder, Werner; Strauss, Herbert A., eds. (1983). "Schoenberger, Guido". International Biographical Dictionary of Central European Emigrés 1933–1945. Vol. 2, 2. Munich: K. G. Saur. p. 1047. ISBN 3-598-10089-2.
- Walk, Joseph, ed. (1988). "Schoenberger, Guido". Kurzbiographien zur Geschichte der Juden 1918–1945 [Short biographies on the history of the Jews 1918–1945] (in German). Munich: K. G. Saur. p. 333. ISBN 3-598-10477-4.
- Heuer, Renate (2012). "Schoenberger, Guido". Lexikon deutsch-jüdischer Autoren (in German). Vol. 19. Berlin: De Gruyter. pp. 102–104.
