= Lorenz Adolf Schönberger =

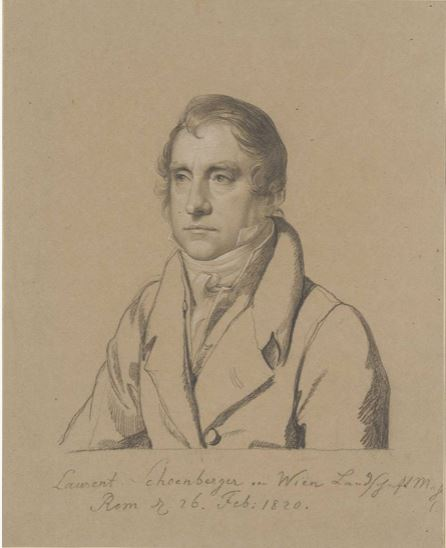
Lorenz Schönberger; portrait by Carl Christian Vogel von Vogelstein (1820)

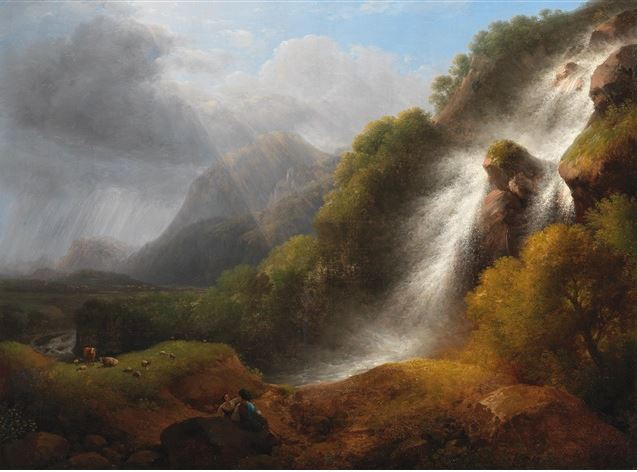
Waterfall in an Italianate Landscape with Shepherds

Lorenz Adolf Schönberger (1768 - 10 August 1846/1847) was an Austrian landscape painter and engraver, in the style of Claude Lorrain.

== Life and work ==
Schönberger was born in 1768 in Bad Vöslau. His father was the Head Chef for Baron Johann von Fries. He received his artistic training at the Academy of Fine Arts, Vienna, where his primary instructor was Michael Wutky.

After completing his education he became and, for much of his life, remained a traveler throughout Central and Western Europe. He was in Paris (1804), Frankfurt (1810), various locations in Italy (mostly Rome) from 1817 to 1825, the Netherlands (1826), England (1830) and back to Rome by 1840. In between, he always returned to Vienna, which he considered to be his home town. While in Amsterdam, he was named a member of the Koninklijke Akademie van Beeldende Kunsten.

He was married twice; first to Marianne Marconi (1785–1882), an opera singer. They soon parted, but she carried his name (as Schönberger-Marconi) throughout her career. Later, he married into the old noble family of Hundbiß von Waltrams from Swabia. His son, Adolf von Schönberger (1804–1880), became a General in the Austrian Cavalry and was ennobled for his military achievements.

He died in Mainz on 10 August 1846 or 1847.
