= Christian Schönenberger =

Swiss experimental physicist and professor

- Born: July 5, 1956; Zürich
- Citizenship: Swiss
- Education: ETH Zurich
- Scientific career
- Fields: condensed matter physics
- Workplaces: University of Basel
- Thesis: Understanding Magnetic Force Microscopy (1990)
- Doctoral advisor: Heinrich Rohrer, S. Alvarado

Christian Schönenberger (born 5 July 1956 in Zürich) is a Swiss experimental physicist and professor at the University of Basel working on nanoscience and nanoelectronics.

== Biography and career ==
Schönenberger studied electrical engineering and obtained his degree in 1979. While working as an engineer in a research lab at the Swiss Federal Institute of Technology in Zurich, he became interested in natural science and studied physics, obtaining his diploma from the institute in 1986. As a graduate student, he worked under the supervision of Heinrich Rohrer (Nobel Prize laureate in 1986) and S. Alvarado at the IBM Research Laboratory at Rüschlikon and received his PhD in physics with a thesis on magnetic force microscopy in 1990.

He then joined the Philips Research Laboratories at Eindhoven in the Netherlands as a postdoctoral fellow and later as a permanent staff member. In 1995 he was appointed full professor (of experimental physics) at the University of Basel, where he heads the Nanoelectronics Group. He led the Swiss Nanoscience Institute (SNI) between 2006 and 2022 and become honorary member of the SNI in 2022.

== Research ==
After his early work on magnetic force microscopy, Schönenberger then used different force microscopy techniques to study single charges and, in particular, single electron tunneling. He studied electron transport in quantum wires and shot noise and noise reduction in electron transport. Subsequently, he and his group studied transport in increasingly smaller natural and engineered nanoscale devices operating in the quantum regime. These include quasi one-dimensional objects such as quantum wires, carbon nanotubes, and DNA-molecules or two-dimensional graphene.

In 1999 he published three of his most-cited and most impactful papers that report key experiments in nanoelectronics. He demonstrated electronic quantum interference by measuring the Aharonov–Bohm effect in multi-walled carbon nanotubes and by realizing the quantum optical Hanbury Brown and Twiss effect for the first time with electrons and demonstrated the anti-bunching effects arising from their fermionic statistics and he demonstrated electron transport through DNA molecules.

In particular, he and his group are a leader in the study of electronic properties of "hybrid" devices, that combine normal metals with superconductors and ferromagnetic elements. The latter introduce by the proximity effect non-trivial correlations such as a pairing or exchange field. This can give rise to new correlated many-body quantum states. Examples are topological states, molecular Andreev-bound states and Majorana-like states. Other applications include the generation of spatially separated entangled electrons using a Cooper pair splitter. More recently, the group investigates ultra-clean and suspended devices, which allow to couple the electrical and mechanical degrees of freedom of the device at the quantum limit.

== Selected publications ==
- Bachtold, A.; Strunk, C.; et al. (1999). "Aharonov-Bohm Oscillations in Carbon Nanotubes". Nature. 397 (6721): 673–675. Bibcode:1999Natur.397..673B. doi:10.1038/17755. S2CID 4429695.
- Henny, M.; Oberholzer, S.; et al. (2000). "The Fermionic Hanbury-Brown and Twiss Experiment" (PDF). Science. 284 (5412): 296–298. Bibcode:1999Sci...284..296H. doi:10.1126/science.284.5412.296. PMID 10195890.
- Buitelaar, M. R.; Nussbaumer, T.; Schönenberger, C. (2002). "A quantum dot in the Kondo regime coupled to superconductors". Phys. Rev. Lett. 89 (25) 256801. arXiv:cond-mat/0209048. Bibcode:2002PhRvL..89y6801B. doi:10.1103/PhysRevLett.89.256801. PMID 12484909. S2CID 27655135.
- Beenakker, Carlo; Schönenberger, Christian (2003). "Quantum Shot Noise" (PDF). Physics Today. 56 (5): 37–42. arXiv:cond-mat/0605025. Bibcode:2003PhT....56e..37B. doi:10.1063/1.1583532. S2CID 119339791.
- Hofstetter, L.; Csonka, C.; et al. (2009). "Cooper-pair splitter realized in a two-quantum-dot Y-junction". Nature. 461 (7266): 960–963. Bibcode:2009Natur.461..960H. doi:10.1038/nature08432. PMID 19829377. S2CID 4392161.
- Rickhaus, Peter; Maurand, Romain; et al. (2013). "Ballistic interferences in suspended graphene". Nature Communications. 4: 2342. arXiv:1304.6590. Bibcode:2013NatCo...4.2342R. doi:10.1038/ncomms3342. PMID 23946010.
- Fink, H.-W.; Schönenberger, Christian (1994). "Electrical conduction through DNA molecules". Nature. 398 (6726): 407–10. Bibcode:1999Natur.398..407F. doi:10.1038/18855. PMID 10201370. S2CID 4422536.
- Schönenberger, Ch.; Alvarado, S. F. (1990). "Observation of single charge carriers by force microscopy". Phys. Rev. Lett. 65 (25): 3162–3164. Bibcode:1990PhRvL..65.3162S. doi:10.1103/PhysRevLett.65.3162. PMID 10042797.
- Schönenberger, Christian; Alvarado, S. F. (199). "Understanding magnetic force microscopy". Zeitschrift für Physik B. 80 (3): 373–383. Bibcode:1990ZPhyB..80..373S. doi:10.1007/BF01323519. S2CID 122559812.

== Selected honors and awards ==
- 1991 Swiss Physical Society Award in General Physics (for his PhD thesis)
- 2010 Lifetime member of the Swiss Academy of Technical Sciences (SATW)
- 2012 Fellow of the American Physical Society (APS)
- 2022 Honorary Member of the Swiss Nanoscience Institute
