= Armand Schönberger =

Hungarian painter

Schönberger, Armand
- Born: Schönberger, Armand; 1885; Galgóc
- Died: 1974 (aged 88–89); Budapest

Armand Schönberger (1885 in Galgóc – 1974 in Budapest) was a Hungarian painter.

== His life ==
Son of Mór Schönberger (1855–1911) engraver and Jozefa Glück. He started out as a self-taught painter, at first he copied Mihály Munkácsy's paintings, then he was a student of the free-spirited evening nude drawing course at the Hungarian Academy of Fine Arts. Later, he continued his education in Munich at the free school opposed to academism led by the Slovenian painter Anton Ažbe. After Ažbe's death, from 1905 he was a student at the official Academy in Munich, where J.C. Herterich and P. Halm were his masters. During the summer, he visited the painting school in Nagybánya. He spent almost every summer here until 1912, the young people who grouped around Béla Czóbel had a great influence on him.

In 1909, he visited Paris, where he got acquainted with Paul Cézanne's view of space and Robert Delaunay's cubist-expressionist paintings, which had a decisive influence on his later art. In the same place, he continued his further education at the evening nude drawings of the Grande Chaumiere. At that time, he still made his portraits and portraits in the spirit of Nagybánya, which he exhibited in the Art Gallery in 1910. As a sign of his change of attitude, he later edited these works, so with a few exceptions (e.g.: Man at a Table, 1906; Paris Woman, Paris Man, 1909) they cannot be reconstructed. In 1913, he exhibited as a sculptor at the Art Gallery, but later stopped his artistic activity in this direction. He was among the avant-garde artists who grouped around the magazines Tett (Deed) in 1915 and Ma (Today) in 1916, founded under the intellectual leadership of Lajos Kassák. He took part in their second exhibition, and from then on he collaborated with them. In 1917, he was one of the founding members of the Hetek (Weeks) painting group. The powerful influence of the Eight, especially Bertalan Pór, can be found in his pictures taken during this period. His works from this period were characterized by critics as pathfinders (e.g.: Boy Act, 1917; Family, 1918). Schönberger was a board member of the Fine Arts Association in 1919, along with J. Kmetty, J. Nemes Lampérth, Dezső Bokros Birman and others.

In the period between the two world wars, he took a stand in favor of progressive aspirations, but did not support the Ma artists, who were forced to emigrate. In 1921, he took part in the exhibitions of the Belvedere, which was founded after the House of Artists. He mainly worked on expressive ink-charcoal and chalk drawings (e.g.: Woman's head, Self-portrait, Under the bridge, 1922), and in 1923 he appeared with these in the Belvedere exhibitions. He also participated in the exhibitions of the New Society of Visual Artists and the Association of New Artists, and was a regular member of the New Society of Visual Artists since its founding. He was influenced by the colors of Cezanne, the Cubists, the German Expressionists and The fauves. He included these stylistic features in a composition with a constructive approach (e.g.: Still Life, early 1920s; Houses on the Hill, 1930; Nude Composition with a Dog, 1929). His pictures taken between the two world wars depict portraits and figurative compositions, as well as scenes of big city life (cafes, concerts, cityscapes). He followed his painterly principles and exhibited few times between 1945 and 1958. The group exhibitions featured his attempts of a socialist nature. In the 1960s, more emphasis was placed on intimate room corners and nudes conveying harmony (e.g. Sleeping Woman, 1964). His graphic and painting work can be considered equal, in both genres he continued the legacy of the early avant-garde.

== Exhibitions ==
- National Theatre, Budapest (1918)
- Belvedere, Budapest (1922)
- Bratislava (1927, 1928, 1930)
- Nagyvarad (1928)
- Tamás Gallery, Budapest (1930)
- Malmö (1932)
- Nest Club, Budapest (1948)
- Art Gallery, Budapest (1958)
- Lifetime exhibition, Hungarian National Gallery, Budapest (cat.) (1970)
- Armand Schönberger memorial exhibition, Hungarian National Gallery, Budapest • István Türr Museum, Baja (1985)
