= Sandro Schoenberger =

German ice hockey player

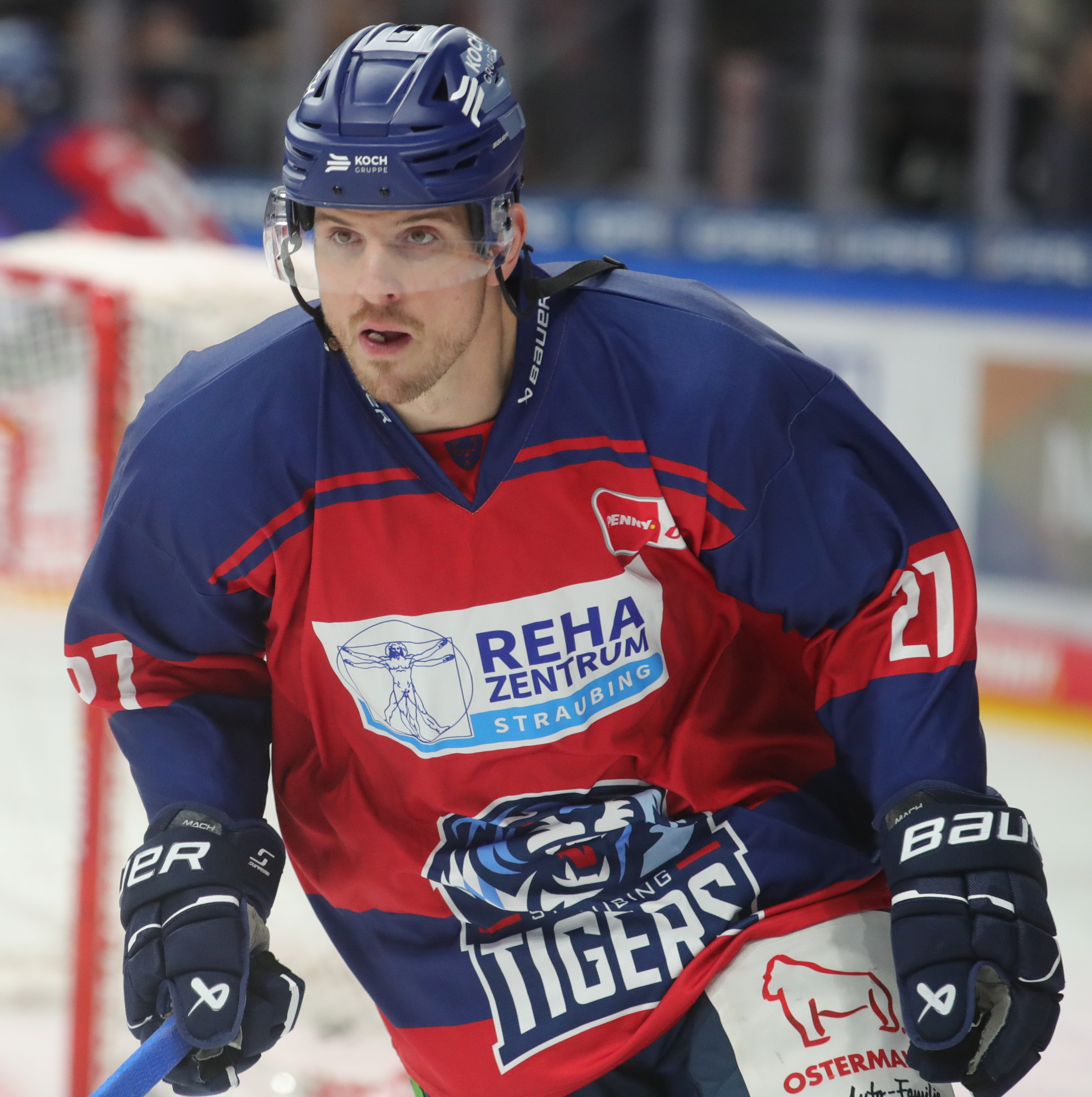
- Schoenberger in 2023
- Born: January 14, 1987 (age 38); Weiden in der Oberpfalz, West Germany
- Height: 6 ft 0 in (183 cm)
- Weight: 187 lb (85 kg; 13 st 5 lb)
- Position: Left wing
- Shoots: Left
- DEL team: Straubing Tigers
- NHL draft: Undrafted
- Playing career: 2004–present

Sandro Schönberger (born January 14, 1987) is a German professional ice hockey player. He is currently playing for Straubing Tigers in the Deutsche Eishockey Liga (DEL).
