= Mark Landin =

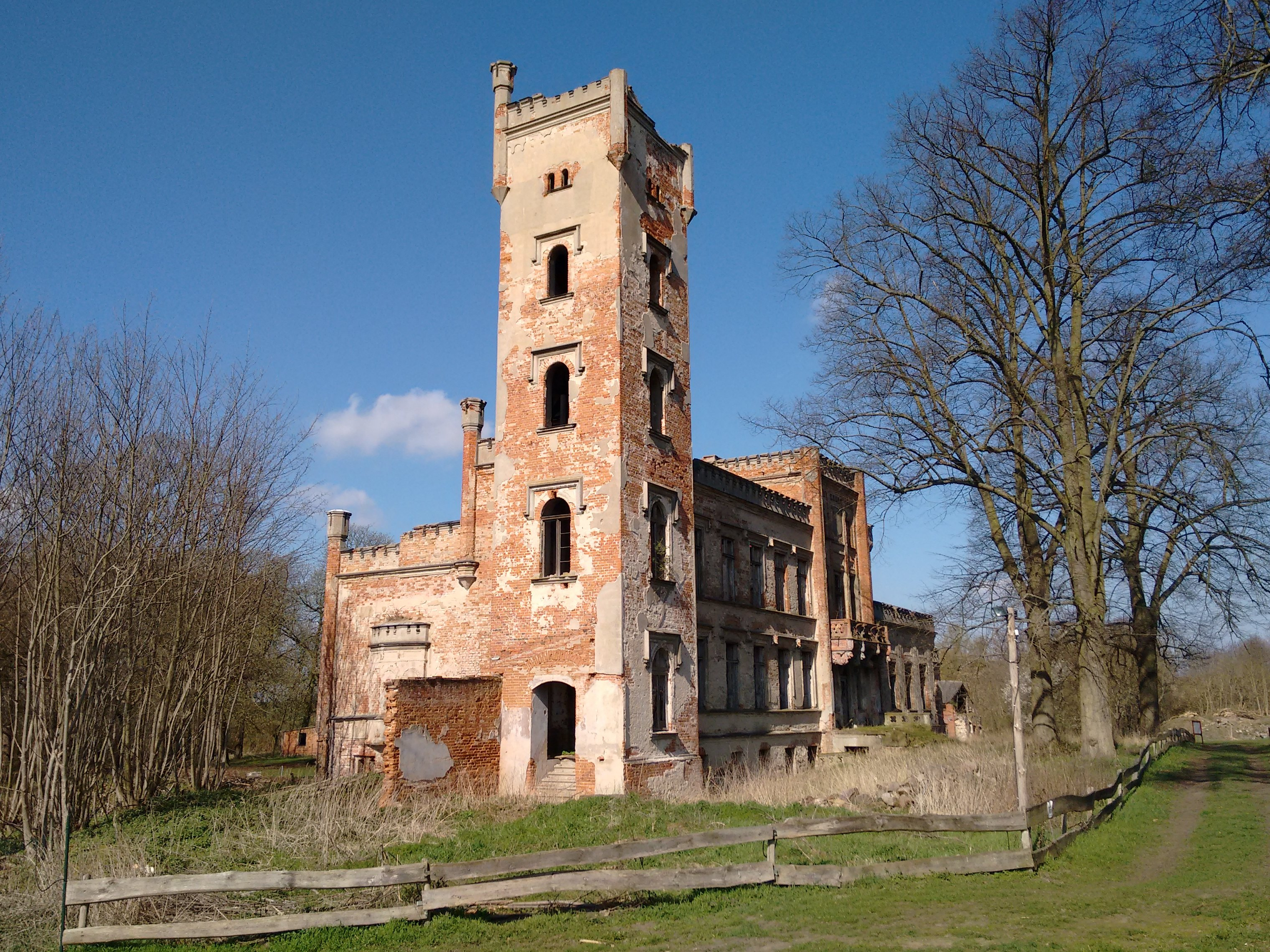
- Castle Hohenlandin
- Interactive map of Mark Landin
- Location within Germany Location within Brandenburg
- Coordinates: 53°05′00″N 14°08′00″E
- Country: Germany
- State: Brandenburg
- District: Uckermark
- Disbanded: 2022

Area
  - Total: 45.41 km^{2} (17.53 sq mi)
- Elevation: 45 m (148 ft)

Population (2020-12-31)
  - Total: 962
  - Density: 21.2/km^{2} (54.9/sq mi)
- Time zone: UTC+01:00 (CET)
  - Summer (DST): UTC+02:00 (CEST)
- Postal codes: 16278
- Dialling codes: 033335, 033336
- Vehicle registration: UM

Mark Landin (German pronunciation: [maʁk ˈlandɪn]) is a former municipality in the Uckermark district, in Brandenburg, Germany. It was merged into the town Schwedt on 19 April 2022. It consisted of the villages Grünow, Landin and Schönermark, which became Ortsteile of Schwedt.

== Demography ==
Development of Population since 1875 within the Current Boundaries (Blue Line: Population; Dotted Line: Comparison to Population Development of Brandenburg state; Grey Background: Time of Nazi rule; Red Background: Time of Communist rule)

Mark Landin: Population development
within the current boundaries (2017)

Year	Pop.	±% p.a.
1875	1,569	—
1890	1,512	−0.25%
1910	1,359	−0.53%
1925	1,471	+0.53%
1933	1,374	−0.85%
1939	1,306	−0.84%
1946	1,919	+5.65%
1950	1,971	+0.67%
1964	1,522	−1.83%
1971	1,428	−0.91%
1981	1,107	−2.51%
1985	1,057	−1.15%
1989	1,048	−0.21%
1990	1,024	−2.29%

Year	Pop.	±% p.a.
1991	970	−5.27%
1992	973	+0.31%
1993	980	+0.72%
1994	988	+0.82%
1995	1,036	+4.86%
1996	1,064	+2.70%
1997	1,094	+2.82%
1998	1,114	+1.83%
1999	1,150	+3.23%
2000	1,176	+2.26%
2001	1,174	−0.17%
2002	1,191	+1.45%
2003	1,181	−0.84%
2004	1,183	+0.17%

Year	Pop.	±% p.a.
2005	1,173	−0.85%
2006	1,147	−2.22%
2007	1,143	−0.35%
2008	1,117	−2.27%
2009	1,094	−2.06%
2010	1,099	+0.46%
2011	1,043	−5.10%
2012	1,054	+1.05%
2013	1,048	−0.57%
2014	1,020	−2.67%
2015	1,014	−0.59%
2016	997	−1.68%
2017	1,013	+1.60%

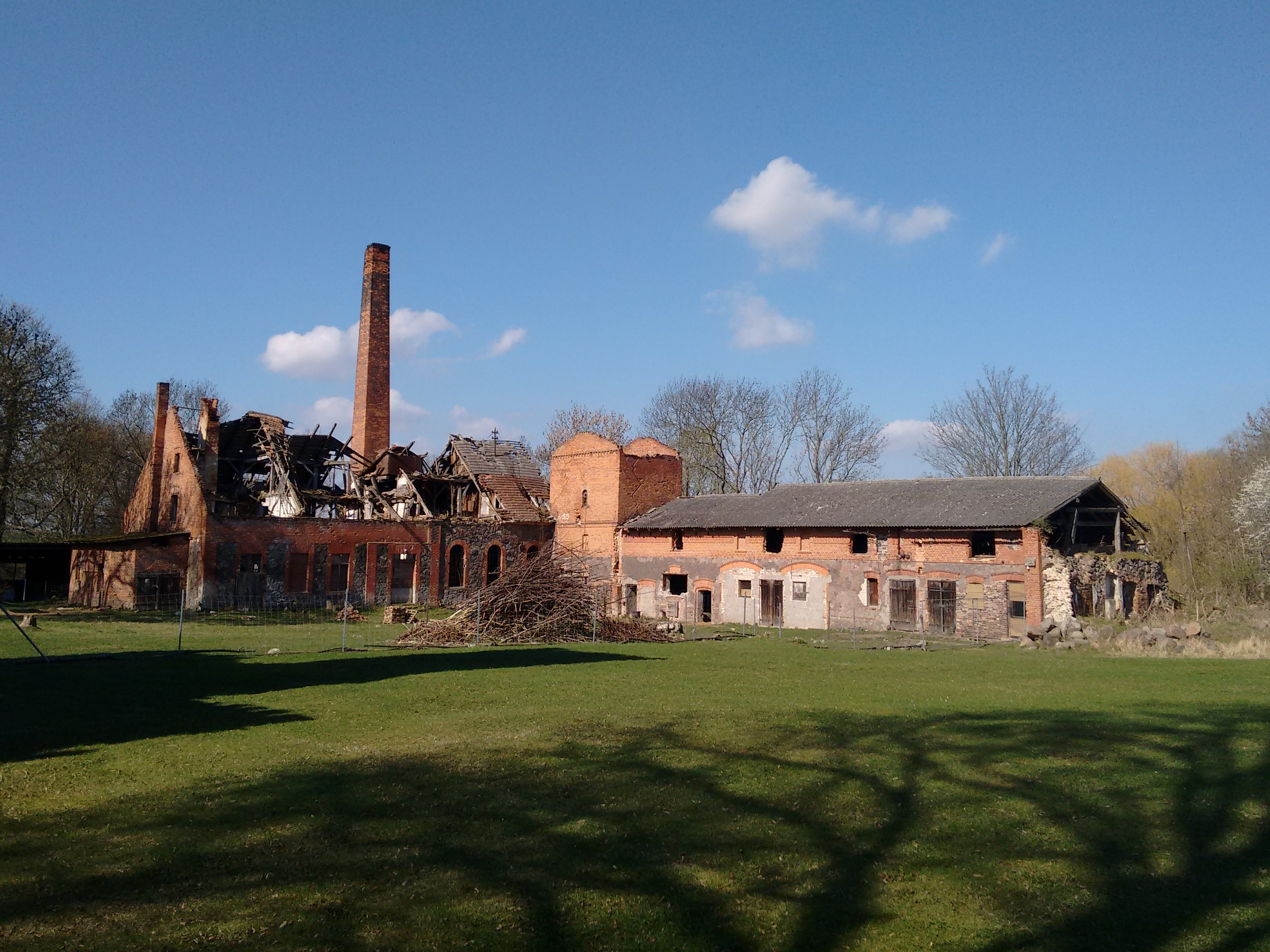
Former distillery
