= Schönenberger =

Schönenberger or Schoenenberger is a German-language toponymic surname literally meaning "someone from Schönenberg". Notable people with the surname include:

- Andrea Gmür-Schönenberger, Swiss politician
- Christian Schönenberger (born 1956), Swiss experimental physicist
- Edith Schönenberger, Swiss cyclist
- Hans Schönenberger (1926–2013), Swiss sports shooter
- Jakob Schönenberger, Swiss politician
- Mario Schönenberger (born 1986), Swiss footballer
- Rita Schönenberger (born 1962), Swiss heptathlete
- Roland Schönenberger (born 1955), Swiss footballer
- Urs Schönenberger (born 1959), Swiss footballer

== See also ==
- Schönberg, Schönberger, Schoenberg, Schoenberger
- Schöneberg, Schöneberger, Schoeneberg, Schoeneberger
- Schönenberg, Schönenberger, Schoenenberg, Schoenenberger
