= Schönberg (surname) =

Schönberg, or Schonberg is a German toponymic surname derived from any places named Schönberg. Variant: Schoenberg Notable people with the surname include:

- Claude-Michel Schönberg (born 1944), French record producer, singer, actor, songwriter and composer of musical theatre
- Dietrich III von Schönberg, brother of Cardinal Nikolaus, appointed Bishop of Dresden-Meissen in 1463
- Harold C. Schonberg (1915–2003), American music critic and journalist
- Mario Schönberg (1914–1990), Brazilian physicist
- Nikolaus von Schönberg (1472–1537), Archbishop of Capua and Cardinal
- Johann Schönberg (1844–1913), Austrian artist, war-correspondent, and illustrator who moved to London and worked from there
- Johann von Schönberg (1492–1517), Bishop of Naumburg
- Hans Meinhard von Schönberg (1582–1616), Master of Household to Frederick V of the Palatinate

== See also ==
- Schoenberg, Schoenberger, Schoenenberg, Schönberg, Schönberger, Schöneberg, Schöneberger, Schönenberg, Schönenberger
