= Valentine Alexius Schoonberg =

Bavarian retail merchant and/or a missionary

Valentine Alexius Schoonberg was a Bavarian retail merchant and/or a missionary based at the Cape of Good Hope in South Africa . He was suspected of being a co-conspirator with individual/s being held (around October 1800) at the Castle after sentencing for capital crimes. He printed the first known book (title plus 7 pages in paper covers) in the Cape, it is also the earliest known printed religious publication in South Africa. It was a translation, from English to Dutch, of a letter brought out in 1799 by Dr. J. T. van der Kemp of the London Missionary Society to their followers in the Cape, entitled "Brief van het Zendelings Genootschap te London aan de Godsdienst-lievende ingezetenen van de Caap de Goede Hoop".

It is possible that he made use of J.C. Ritter's press. Only one copy is known to exist and is in the South African Library.

== See also ==
Global spread of the printing press
