= Schöneberger =

Schöneberger or Schoeneberger is a German toponymic surname literally meaning "someone from Schöneberg. Notable people with the surname include:

- Barbara Schöneberger, German TV presenter and entertainer
- Heinz Schöneberger (1938–1965), victim of the Berlin Wall shooting

== See also ==
- Schönberg, Schönberger, Schoenberg, Schoenberger
- Schöneberg, Schöneberger, Schoeneberg, Schoeneberger
- Schönenberg, Schönenberger, Schoenenberg, Schoenenberger
