= Schönenberg =

Schönenberg may refer to:

== People ==
- Schönenberg (surname)

== Places ==
- Schönenberg, Baden-Württemberg, Germany
- Schönenberg, Zürich, Switzerland
- Schönenberg-Kübelberg, Rhineland-Palatinate, Germany
- Kradolf-Schönenberg, Switzerland
- Schönenberg an der Thur, Switzerland

== See also ==
- Schönenberger (disambiguation)
- Schöneberg (disambiguation)
