= Schönenberg (surname) =

Schönenberg or Schoenenberg is a German toponymic surname named after any of places named Schönenberg, Schöneberg, or Schönberg. Notable people with this surname include:

- Georg von Schönenberg (1530–1595), Prince-Bishop of Worms
- Johann von Schönenberg (1525–1599), Archbishop-Elector of Trier
- Tobias Schönenberg (born 1986), German actor
- Vera Schoenenberg (born 1973), German operatic soprano

== See also ==
- Schoenberg, Schoenberger, Schoenenberg, Schönberg, Schönberger, Schöneberg, Schöneberger, Schönenberg, Schönenberger
