= Schoenberg (surname) =

Schoenberg (German: beautiful mountain) is a German surname, a spelling variant of "Schönberg". Notable persons with that surname include:

- Adam Schoenberg (born 1980), American composer
- Arnold Schoenberg (1874–1951), Austrian-American composer
- Claude-Michel Schoenberg (born 1944), French record producer, actor, singer, popular songwriter, and musical theatre composer
- E. Randol Schoenberg (born 1966), American lawyer and grandson of Arnold Schoenberg
- Gertrud Schoenberg (1898–1967), librettist and publisher, second wife of Arnold Schoenberg
- Isaac Jacob Schoenberg (1903–1990), Romanian mathematician
- Mario Schoenberg (1914–1990), Brazilian physicist
- Michael Schoenberg (1939–2008), American geophysicist

== See also ==
- Schönberg, Schönberger, Schoenberg, Schoenberger
- Schöneberg, Schöneberger, Schoeneberg, Schoeneberger
- Schönenberg, Schönenberger, Schoenenberg, Schoenenberger
