= Casekow station =

Railway station in Brandenburg, Germany

Casekow
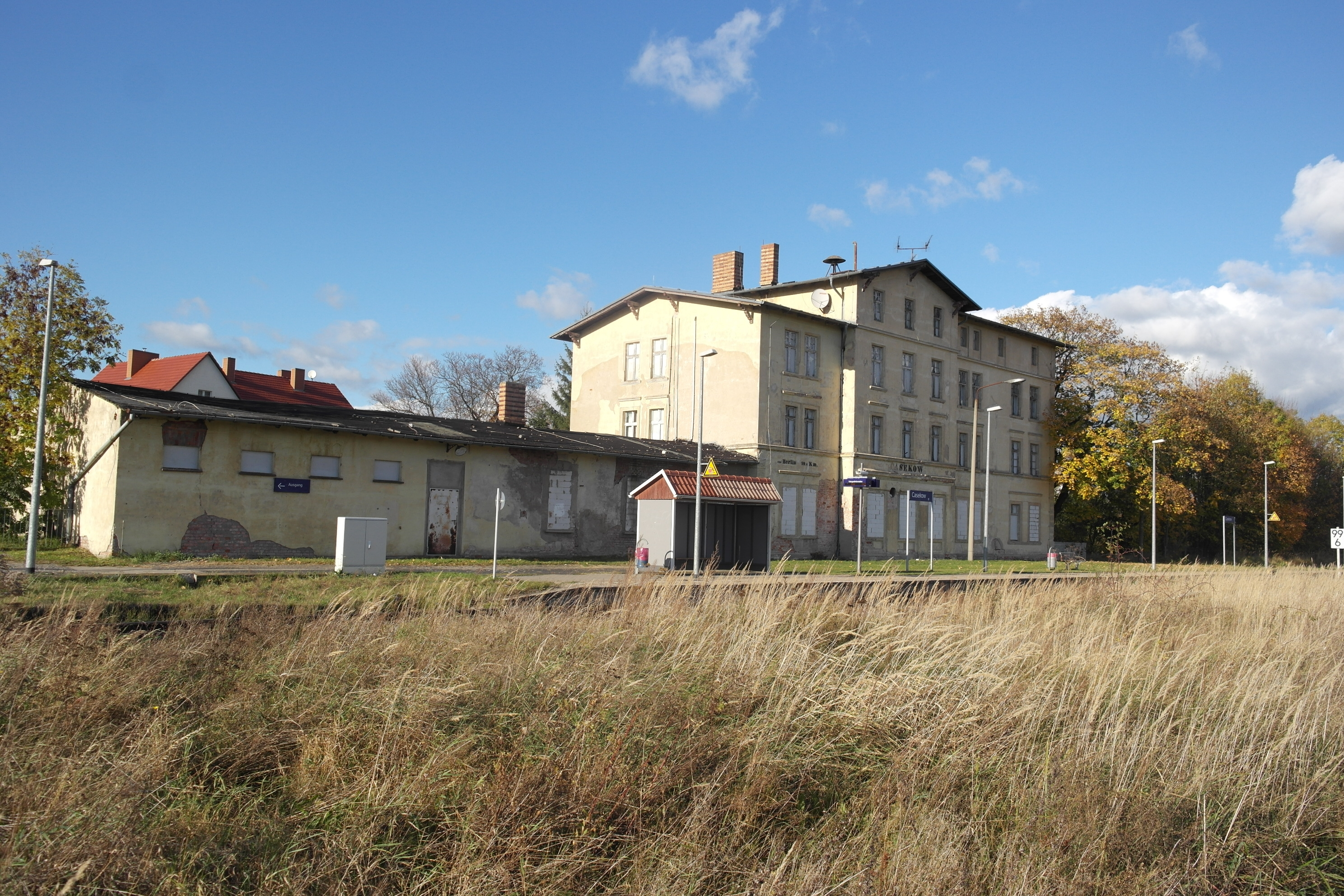
- 2013

General information
- Location: Bahnhofstraße 10; 16306 Casekow; Brandenburg; Germany
- Coordinates: 53.2136°N 14.2081°E
- Owner: Deutsche Bahn
- Operator: DB Station&Service
- Lines: Berlin–Szczecin railway (KBS 209.66)
- Platforms: 1 side platform
- Tracks: 1
- Train operators: DB Regio Nordost

Other information
- Station code: 1032
- DS100 code: WCW
- IBNR: 8011311
- Category: 7
- Fare zone: VBB: 3968
- Website: www.bahnhof.de

History
- Opened: 12 October 1857; 168 years ago

Services
Preceding station	DB Regio Nordost	Following station
Schönow (Angermünde) towards Berlin Gesundbrunnen	RE 66	Petershagen (Uckermark) towards Szczecin Główny
Schönow (Angermünde) towards Angermünde	RB 66	Petershagen (Uckermark) towards Szczecin Główny
Location
- Location within Brandenburg Location within Germany Location within Europe

Casekow station is a railway station in the municipality of Casekow, located in the Uckermark district in Brandenburg, Germany.
