= Petershagen (Uckermark) station =

Railway station in Germany

Petershagen (Uckermark)
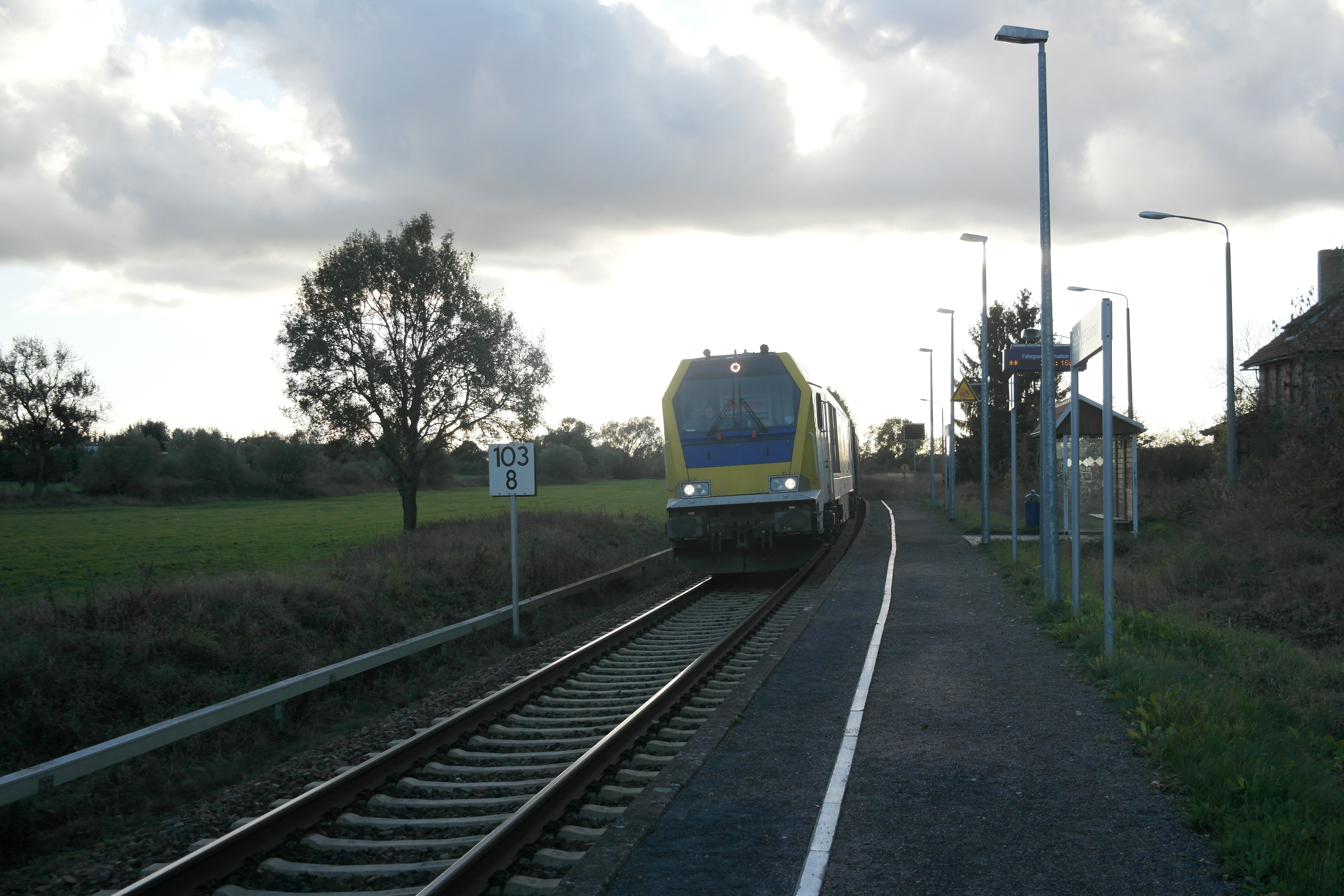
- 2013

General information
- Location: Zum Fuchsgrund/Beatenhofer Weg; 16306 Luckow-Petershagen; Brandenburg; Germany
- Coordinates: 53°14′24″N 14°15′10″E
- Owner: Deutsche Bahn
- Operator: DB Station&Service
- Lines: Berlin–Szczecin railway (KBS 209.66)
- Platforms: 1 side platform
- Tracks: 1
- Train operators: DB Regio Nordost

Other information
- Station code: 4904
- DS100 code: WPE
- IBNR: 8012627
- Category: 6
- Fare zone: VBB: 3868
- Website: www.bahnhof.de

History
- Opened: 1 May 1908; 118 years ago

Services
Preceding station	DB Regio Nordost	Following station
Casekow towards Berlin Gesundbrunnen	RE 66	Tantow towards Szczecin Główny
Casekow towards Angermünde	RB 66	Tantow towards Szczecin Główny
Location
- Location within Brandenburg Location within Germany Location within Europe

Petershagen (Uckermark) station is a railway station in the municipality of Luckow-Petershagen, located in the Uckermark district in Brandenburg, Germany.
