= Passow (Uckermark) station =

Railway station in Passow, Germany

Passow (Uckermark)
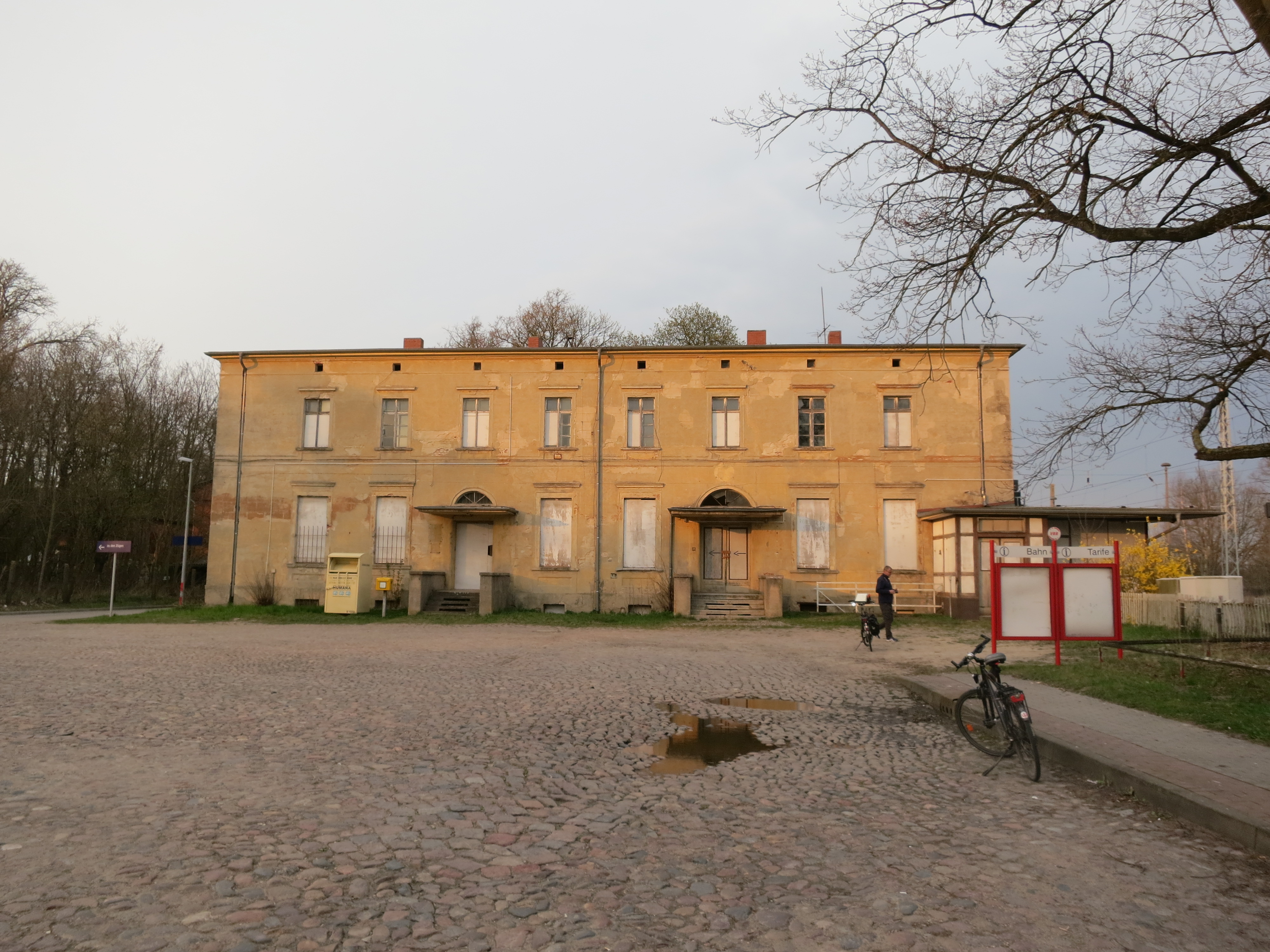
- 2016

General information
- Location: Am Bahnhof 1; 16306 Passow; Brandenburg; Germany
- Coordinates: 53°08′55″N 14°06′04″E
- Owner: Deutsche Bahn
- Operator: DB Station&Service
- Lines: Berlin–Szczecin railway (KBS 209.66); Passow–Schwedt railway
- Platforms: 1 side platform
- Tracks: 3
- Train operators: DB Regio Nordost

Other information
- Station code: 4874
- DS100 code: WPS
- IBNR: 8012611
- Category: 6
- Fare zone: VBB: 4167
- Website: www.bahnhof.de

History
- Opened: 1843; 183 years ago

Services
Preceding station	DB Regio Nordost	Following station
Angermünde towards Berlin Gesundbrunnen	RE 66	Schönow (Angermünde) towards Szczecin Główny
Angermünde Terminus	RB 66	Schönow (Angermünde) towards Szczecin Główny
Location

Passow (Uckermark) station is a railway station in the municipality of Passow, located in the Uckermark district in Brandenburg, Germany.
