= Franz Floerke =

German politician (1811–1889)

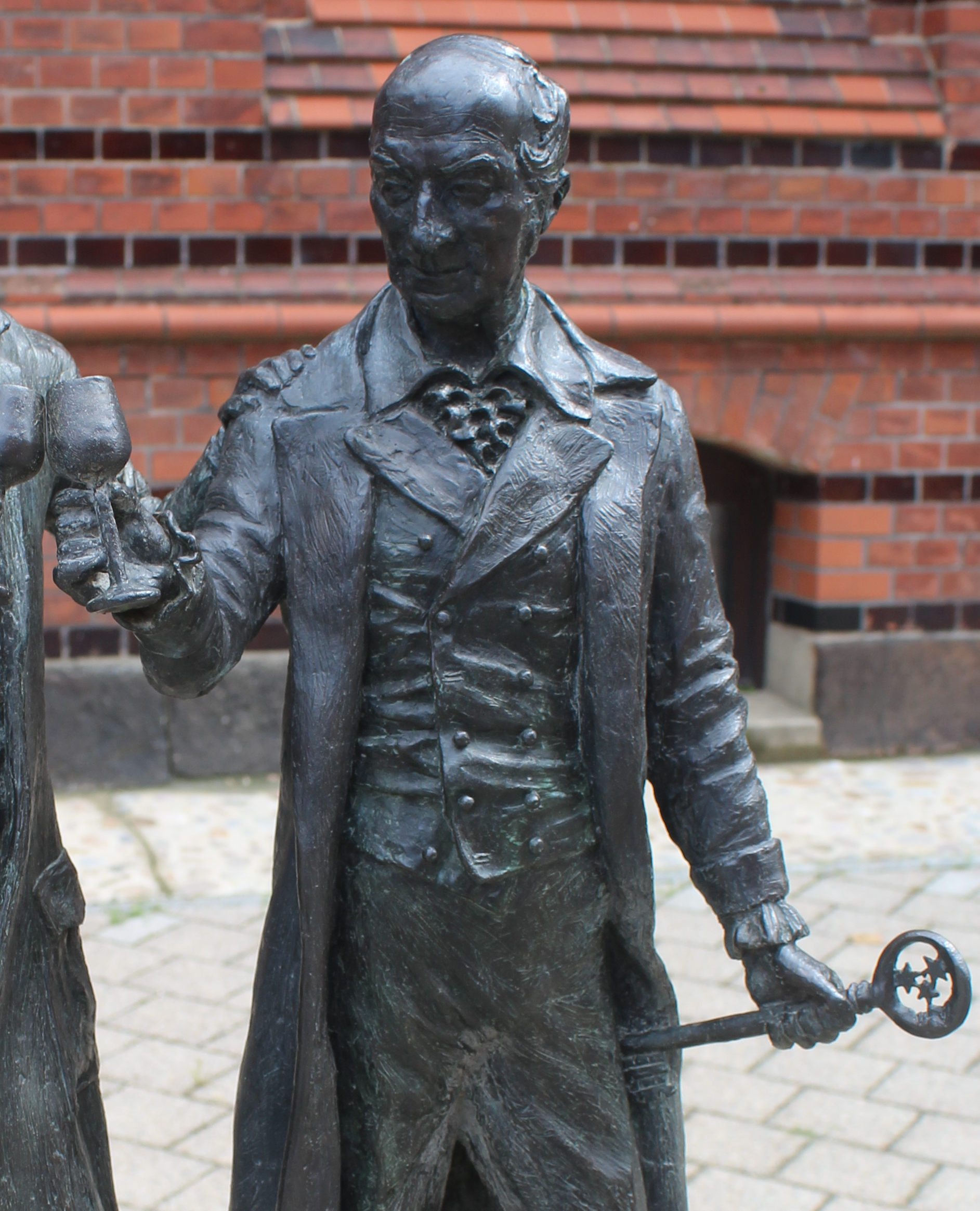
- Sculpture of Franz Floerke in Grabow

Mayor of Grabow
- In office 1839–1888
- Preceded by: Martin-Conrad Stollberg
- Succeeded by: Carl Calsow

Personal details
- Born: 6 November 1811 Ludwigslust, Duchy of Mecklenburg-Schwerin, German Confederation
- Died: 13 August 1889 (aged 77) Grabow, Grand Duchy of Mecklenburg-Schwerin, German Empire
- Education: University of Göttingen
- Occupation: Advocate, mayor

Friedrich Franz Leopold Floerke (6 November 1811 – 13 August 1889) was a German jurist and politician who served as the mayor of Grabow from 1839 to 1888, almost 50 years, which made him the longest-serving mayor of the town.

== Biography ==
Franz Floerke was born in Ludwigslust on 6 November 1811 as the son of the theologian and superintendent Albrecht Floerke (1777–1848) and his wife Katharina Henriette Margarethe Marquart (1789 -1840). In 1812 his family moved to Hagenow and in 1824 to Parchim, where he lived until leaving for university He attended the Friedrich-Franz-Gymnasium in Parchim where he met Fritz Reuter, who would later call Floerke a school friend, as well as completing his Abitur on 29 September 1831. After graduating together, Floerke and Reuter would part ways as the Floerke started attending the University of Göttingen as a student of law, from which he graduated in 1834. Later that year, Floerke settled in Grabow where he became a renowned and trusted advocate.

On 20 June 1839 Floerke reunited with Reuter while Reuter was still Festungshaft, passing through Grabow in transit. Reuter again visited Floerke after being released while on the way to his home town of Stavenhagen.

On 1 July 1839, at the age of 28, Floerke was elected as the mayor of Grabow with an absolute majority in the city council. Arguably the biggest achievement of his tenure was his advocacy for the construction of the Berlin–Hamburg railway through Grabow and the town's inclusion as a stop on the line. His endeavour successful, the first train arrived at the Grabow station from Berlin by noon on 15 October 1846 under applause of the residents. Floerke also greatly contributed to the expansion of other infrastructure, such as bridges and roads, as well as the settlement of industry in the town. He retired on 1 January 1889 after serving a tenure of 50 years as the mayor of Grabow. Soon after, he became sick and eventually died on 13 August 1889. He was buried in the old Grabow cemetery. His grave no longer exists.

== Personal life ==
Floerke was married and had at least eight children, thereof six sons. He lived at Steindamm 1 in Grabow, a building that was demolished and replaced by a more modern building in the 1980s. He was a member of the Grabow Schützenverein.

== Legacy ==
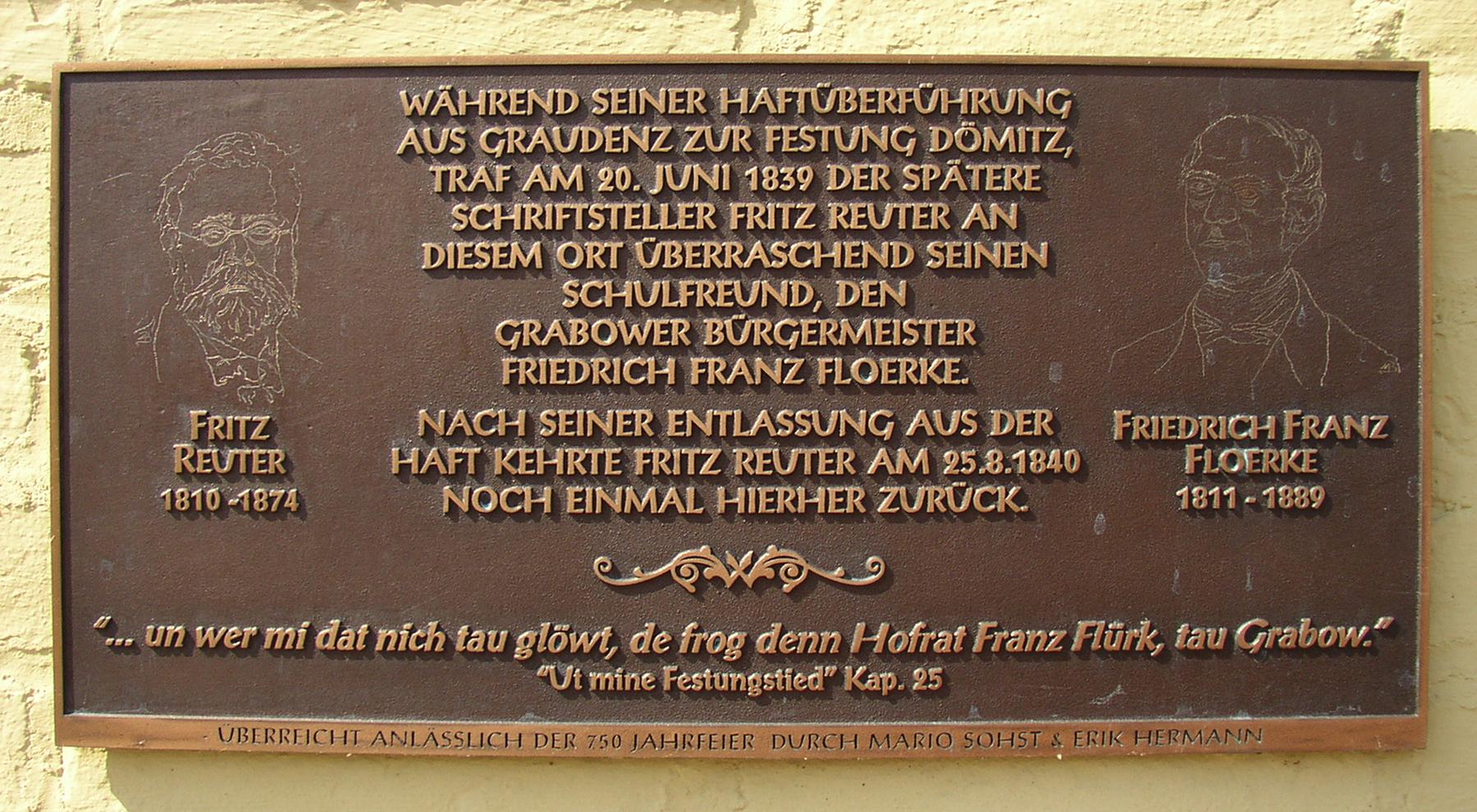
Commemorative plaque on the Grabow town hall

There is a plaque commemorating him on the Grabow town hall. A sculpture by Bernd Streiter, unveiled on 1 April 2016, situated between the town hall and St. Georges church, shows him meeting with Fritz Reuter. A road in Grabow, the Floerkestraße, is named after him.
