= Szczecin Główny–Stobno Szczecińskie railway =

Railway line in Poland

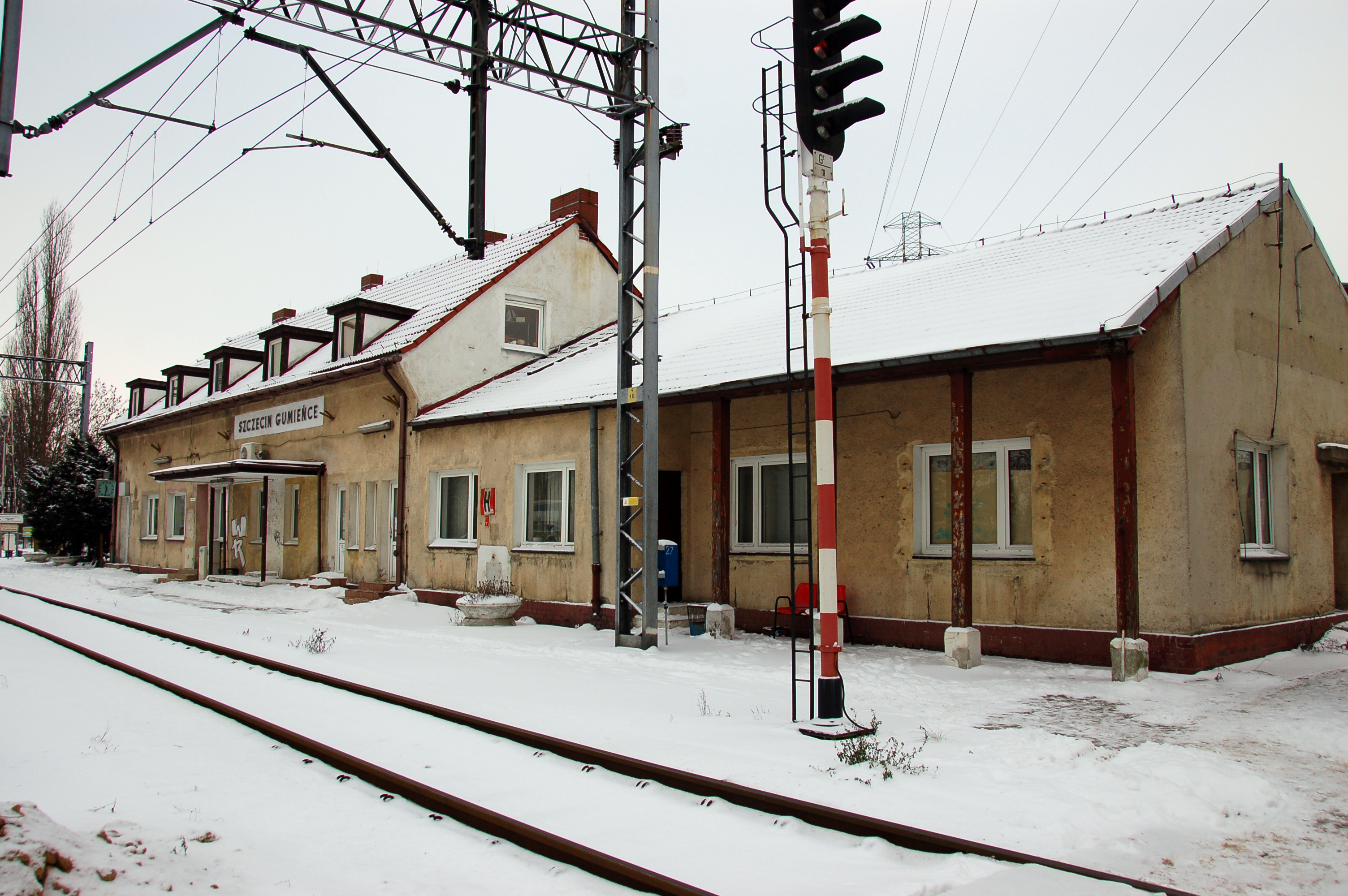
- Szczecin Gumieńce railway station

Overview
- Status: in use
- Locale: Poland
- Termini: Szczecin Główny; Stobno Szczecińskie

Service
- Route number: PKP 408

History
- Opened: 1863; 163 years ago

Technical
- Line length: 13.190 km (8.196 mi)
- Track gauge: 1,435 mm (4 ft 8 1/2 in) standard gauge
- Electrification: none (planned)
- Operating speed: 120 km/h (75 mph)

The Szczecin Główny–Stobno Szczecińskie railway is a partially electrified, single- and double-track railway line of state importance connecting Szczecin Główny railway station with Stobno Szczecińskie railway station (former Gumieńce-Grambow border crossing).
