= Zerrenthin station =

Railway station in Germany

Zerrenthin
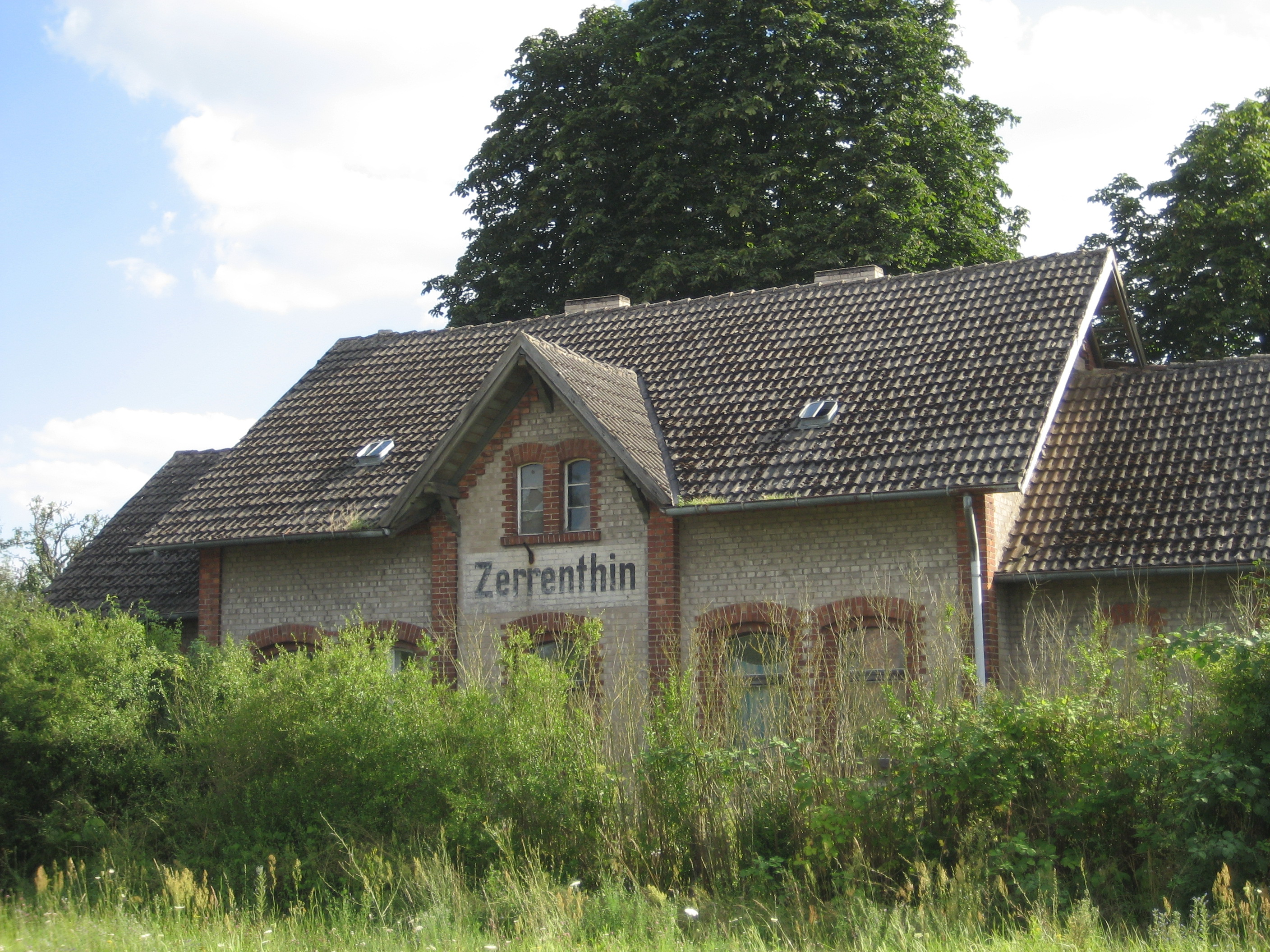
- 2014

General information
- Location: Zerrenthin, MV, Germany
- Coordinates: 53°29′57″N 14°05′52″E
- Line: Bützow–Szczecin railway
- Platforms: 1
- Tracks: 1

History
- Opened: 1880

Services
Preceding station	DB Regio Nordost	Following station
Pasewalk Ost towards Bützow	RE 4	Löcknitz towards Szczecin Główny
Location

Zerrenthin (German: Bahnhof Zerrenthin) is a railway station in the village of Zerrenthin, Mecklenburg-Vorpommern, Germany. The station lies of the Bützow–Szczecin railway and the train services are operated by Deutsche Bahn.

== Train services ==
The station is served by the following services:

- regional express (RE 6) Lübeck - Bad Kleinen - Güstrow - Neubrandenburg - Pasewalk - Szczecin
