= Löcknitz station =

Railway station in Germany

Löcknitz
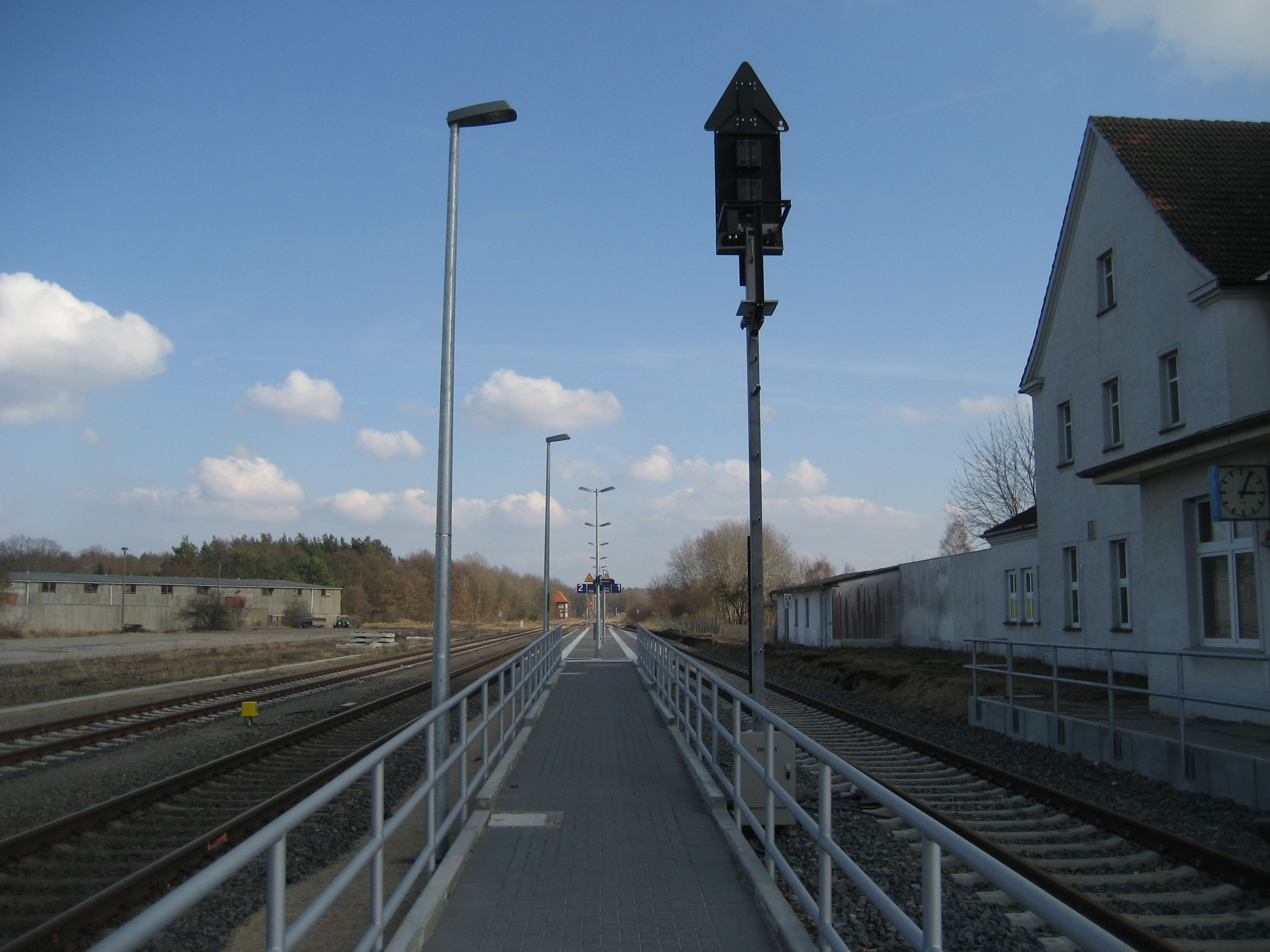

General information
- Location: Löcknitz, MV, Germany
- Coordinates: 53°27′21″N 14°12′57″E
- Line: Bützow–Szczecin railway
- Platforms: 2
- Tracks: 3

History
- Opened: 16 March 1863; 163 years ago

Services
Preceding station	DB Regio Nordost	Following station
Zerrenthin towards Bützow	RE 4	Grambow towards Szczecin Główny
Location

Löcknitz (German: Bahnhof Löcknitz) is a railway station in the village of Löcknitz, Mecklenburg-Vorpommern, Germany. The station lies of the Bützow–Szczecin railway and the train services are operated by Deutsche Bahn.

== Train services ==
The station is served by the following services:

- regional express (RE 6) Lübeck - Bad Kleinen - Güstrow - Neubrandenburg - Pasewalk - Szczecin
