= Pasewalk Ost station =

Railway Station

Pasewalk Ost

General information
- Location: Pasewalk, MV, Germany
- Coordinates: 53°30′34″N 14°00′28″E
- Line: Bützow–Szczecin railway
- Platforms: 1

History
- Opened: Before 1949

Services
Preceding station	DB Regio Nordost	Following station
Pasewalk towards Bützow	RE 4	Zerrenthin towards Szczecin Główny
Location

Pasewalk Ost (German: Bahnhof Pasewalk Ost) is a railway station in the town of Pasewalk, Mecklenburg-Vorpommern, Germany. The station lies of the Bützow–Szczecin railway and the train services are operated by Deutsche Bahn.

== Train services ==
The station is served by the following services:

- regional express (RE 6) Lübeck - Bad Kleinen - Güstrow - Neubrandenburg - Pasewalk - Szczecin
