= Tantow station =

Railway station in Tantow, Germany

Tantow
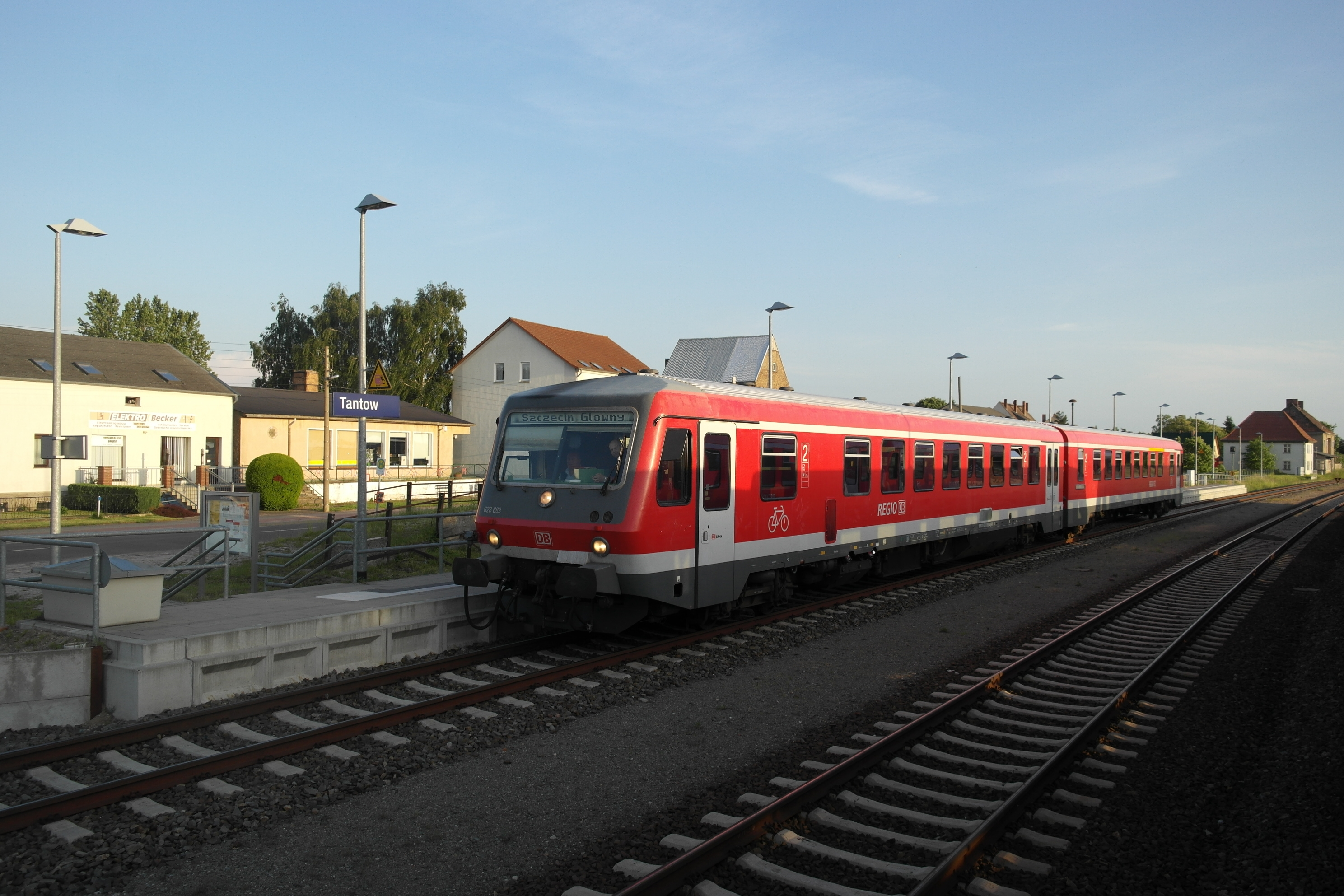
- 2013

General information
- Location: Bahnhofstraße 2; 16307 Tantow; Brandenburg; Germany
- Coordinates: 53°16′14″N 14°20′59″E
- Owner: Deutsche Bahn
- Operator: DB Station&Service
- Lines: Berlin–Szczecin railway (KBS 209.66); Tantow–Gartz railway
- Platforms: 2 side platforms
- Tracks: 3
- Train operators: DB Regio Nordost

Other information
- Station code: 6146
- DS100 code: WTA
- IBNR: 8013090
- Category: 6
- Fare zone: VBB: 3870
- Website: www.bahnhof.de

History
- Opened: 16 August 1843; 183 years ago

Services
Preceding station	DB Regio Nordost	Following station
Petershagen (Uckermark) towards Berlin Gesundbrunnen	RE 66	Szczecin Gumieńce towards Szczecin Główny
Petershagen (Uckermark) towards Angermünde	RB 66	Szczecin Gumieńce towards Szczecin Główny
Location

Tantow station is a railway station in the municipality of Tantow, located in the Uckermark district in Brandenburg, Germany.
