= Grambow station =

Railway station in Germany

Grambow

General information
- Location: Grambow, Mecklenburg-Vorpommern, Germany
- Coordinates: 53°25′02″N 14°20′52″E
- Line: Bützow–Szczecin railway
- Platforms: 1
- Tracks: 1

History
- Opened: 16 March 1863; 163 years ago

Services
Preceding station	DB Regio Nordost	Following station
Löcknitz towards Bützow	RE 4	Szczecin Gumieńce towards Szczecin Główny
Location

Grambow (German: Bahnhof Grambow) is a railway station in the village of Grambow, Mecklenburg-Vorpommern, Germany. The station lies on the Bützow–Szczecin railway and the train services are operated by Deutsche Bahn.

== Train services ==
The station is served by the following services:

- regional express (RE 6) Lübeck - Bad Kleinen - Güstrow - Neubrandenburg - Pasewalk - Szczecin
