= Szczecin Gumieńce railway station =

Railway station in Gumieńce, Poland

Szczecin Gumieńce
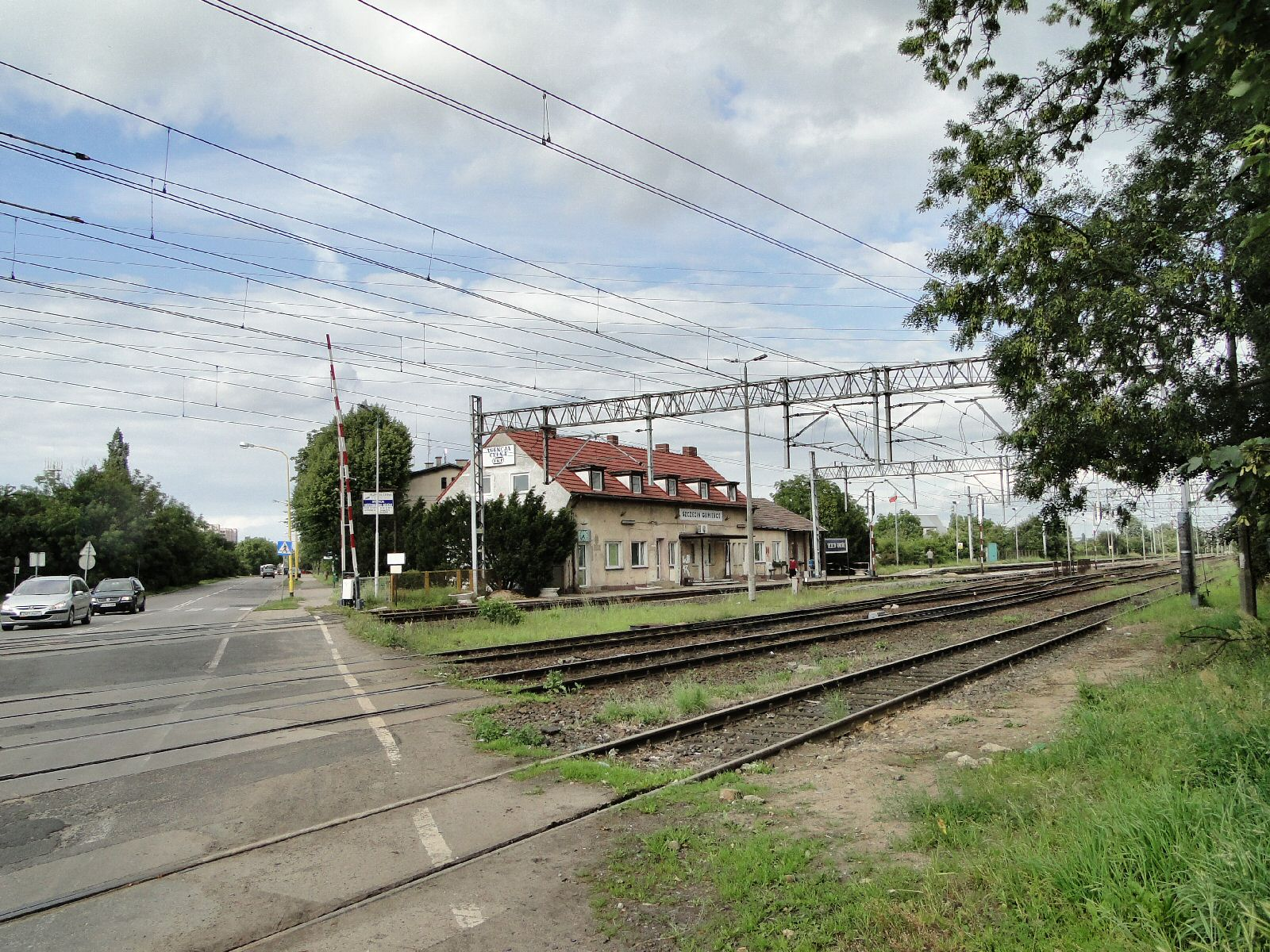
- Szczecin Gumieńce railway station

General information
- Location: Gumieńce, Szczecin, West Pomeranian Voivodeship, Poland
- Coordinates: 53°23′52″N 14°29′44″E
- Lines: Berlin-Szczecin railway Bützow–Szczecin railway
- Platforms: 3

Other information
- Fare zone: VBB: 3473 (to/from Germany only)

Services
Preceding station	DB Regio Nordost	Following station
Grambow towards Bützow	RE 4	Szczecin Główny Terminus
Tantow towards Berlin Gesundbrunnen	RE 66	Szczecin Główny Terminus
Tantow towards Angermünde	RB 66	Szczecin Główny Terminus
Location
- Location within Poland

Szczecin Gumieńce (Polish: Szczecin Gumieńce) is a railway station in the town of Gumieńce, West Pomeranian Voivodeship, Poland. The station lies on the Berlin-Szczecin railway and Bützow–Szczecin railway.
