= Grambow =

- Municipality
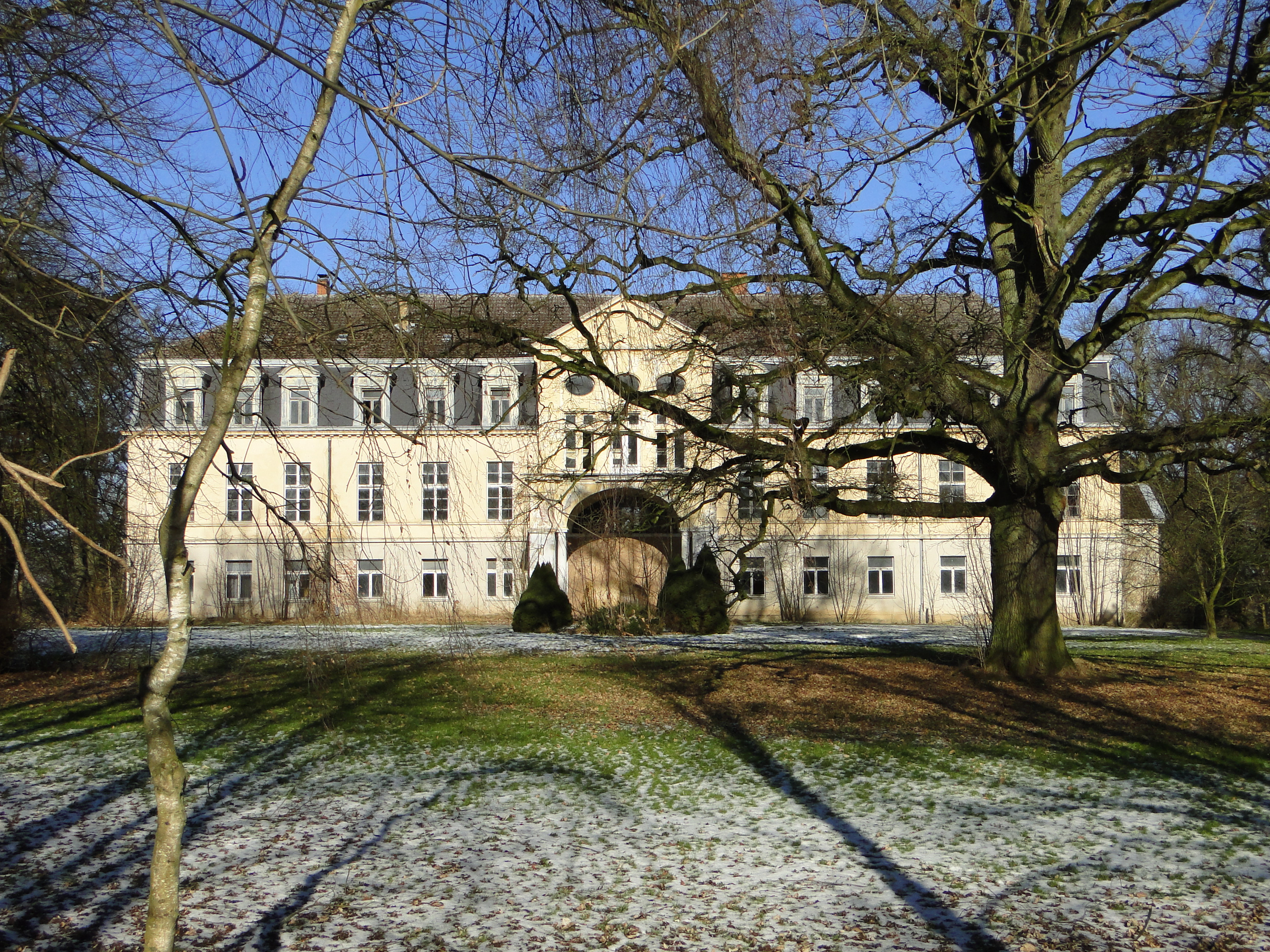
- Manor in Grambow

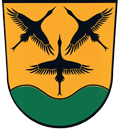
- Coat of arms

- Location of Grambow within Nordwestmecklenburg district
- Interactive map of Grambow
- Location within Germany Location within Mecklenburg-Vorpommern
- Coordinates: 53°37′N 11°16′E
- Country: Germany
- State: Mecklenburg-Vorpommern
- District: Nordwestmecklenburg
- Municipal assoc.: Lützow-Lübstorf

Government
  - Mayor: Herbert Piotrowski

Area
  - Total: 19.80 km^{2} (7.64 sq mi)
- Elevation: 47 m (154 ft)

Population (2025-12-31)
  - Total: 655
  - Density: 33.1/km^{2} (85.7/sq mi)
- Time zone: UTC+01:00 (CET)
  - Summer (DST): UTC+02:00 (CEST)
- Postal codes: 19071
- Dialling codes: 0385
- Vehicle registration: NWM

Grambow is a municipality in the Nordwestmecklenburg district, in Mecklenburg-Vorpommern, Germany.

It is close to the cities of Lübeck, Wismar and Schwerin and is part of the Hamburg Metropolitan Region.
