= Zerrenthin =

- Municipality
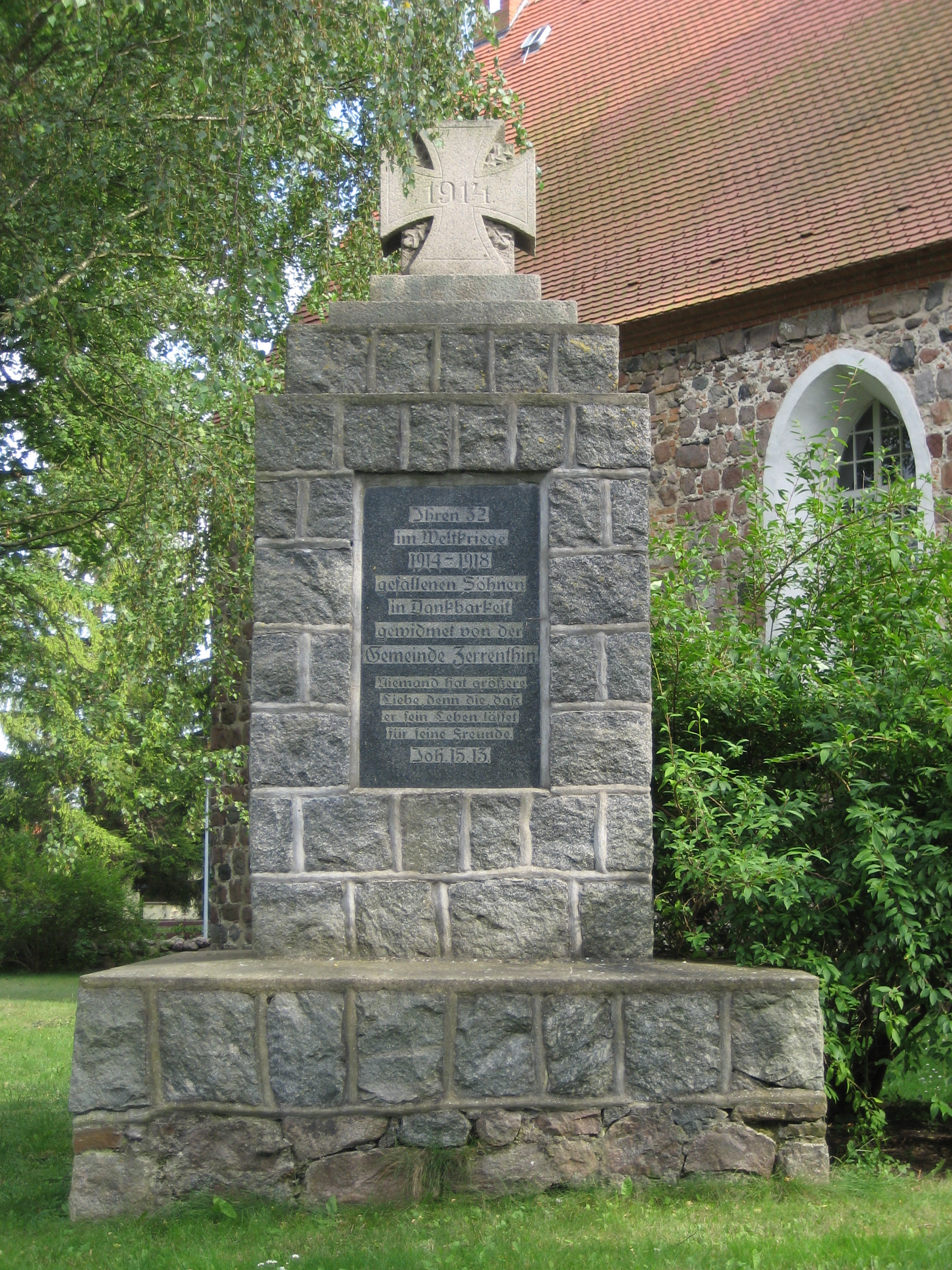
- World War I memorial in Zerrenthin

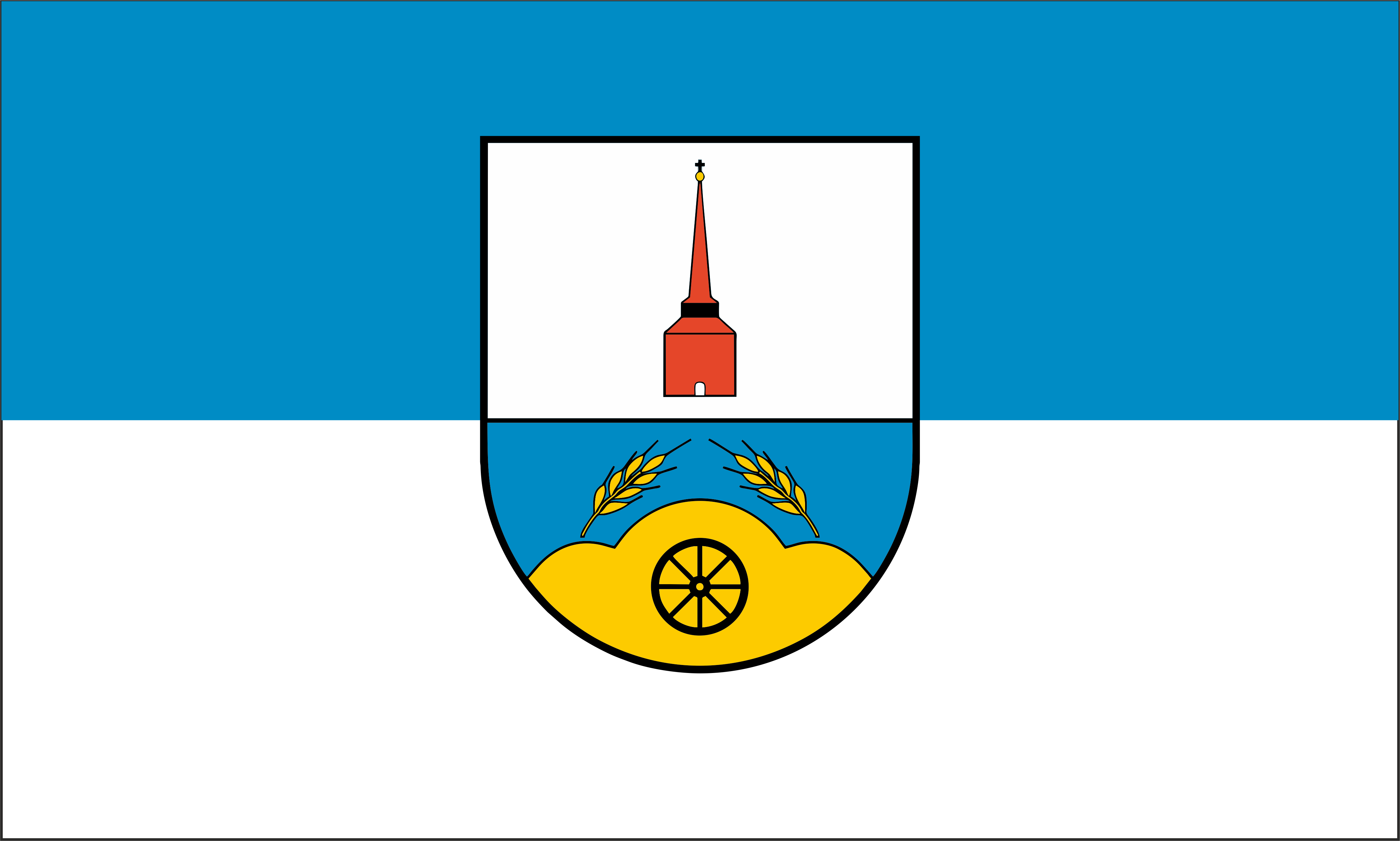
- Flag Coat of arms

- Location of Zerrenthin within Vorpommern-Greifswald district
- Interactive map of Zerrenthin
- Location within Germany Location within Mecklenburg-Vorpommern
- Coordinates: 53°29′N 14°05′E
- Country: Germany
- State: Mecklenburg-Vorpommern
- District: Vorpommern-Greifswald
- Municipal assoc.: Uecker-Randow-Tal

Government
  - Mayor: Uwe Meinherz

Area
  - Total: 14.30 km^{2} (5.52 sq mi)
- Elevation: 22 m (72 ft)

Population (2025-12-31)
  - Total: 448
  - Density: 31.3/km^{2} (81.1/sq mi)
- Time zone: UTC+01:00 (CET)
  - Summer (DST): UTC+02:00 (CEST)
- Postal codes: 17309
- Dialling codes: 039743
- Vehicle registration: VG
- Website: www.amt-uecker-randow-tal.de

Zerrenthin is a municipality in the Vorpommern-Greifswald district, in Mecklenburg-Vorpommern, Germany.
