= Casekow =

- Municipality
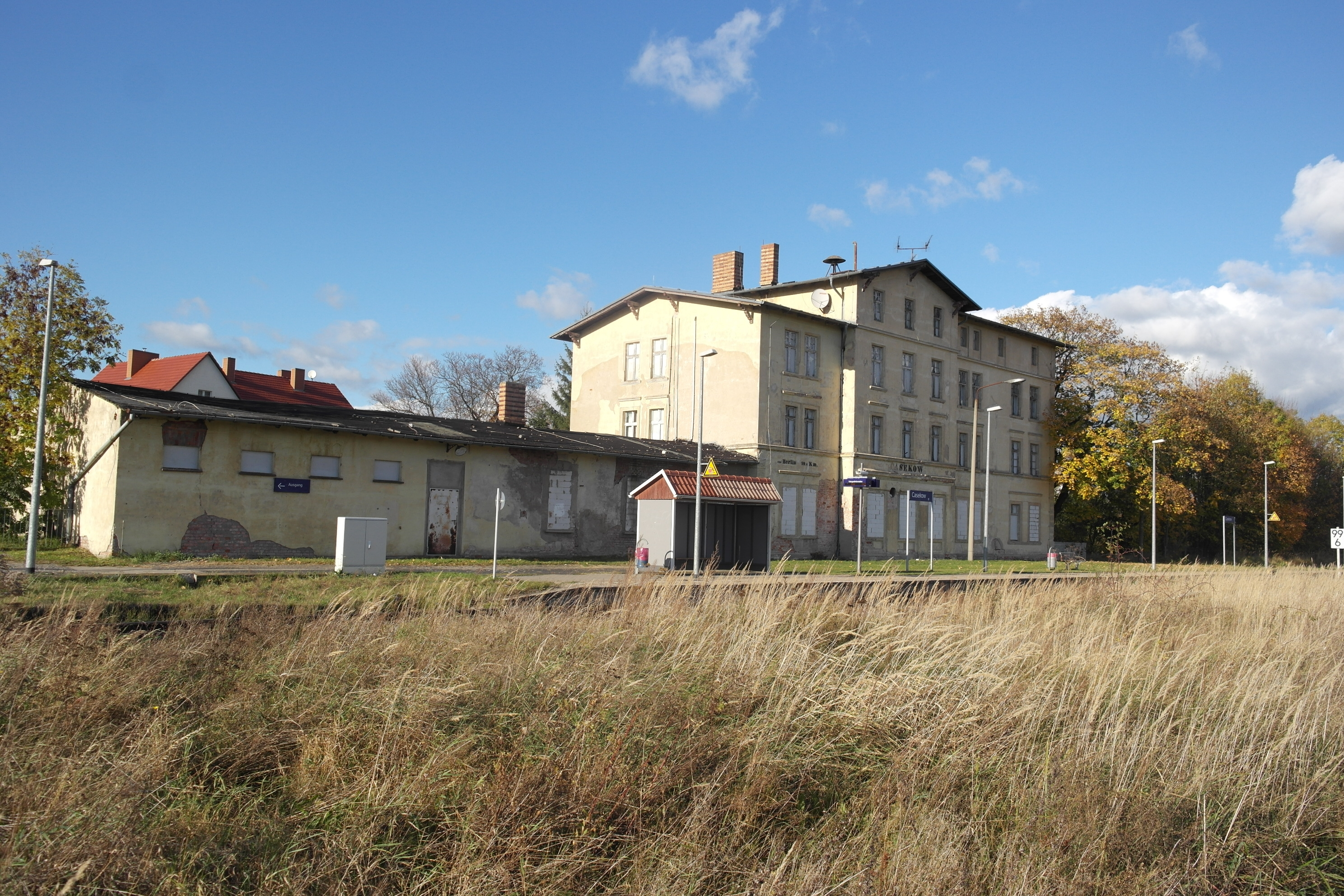
- Train station

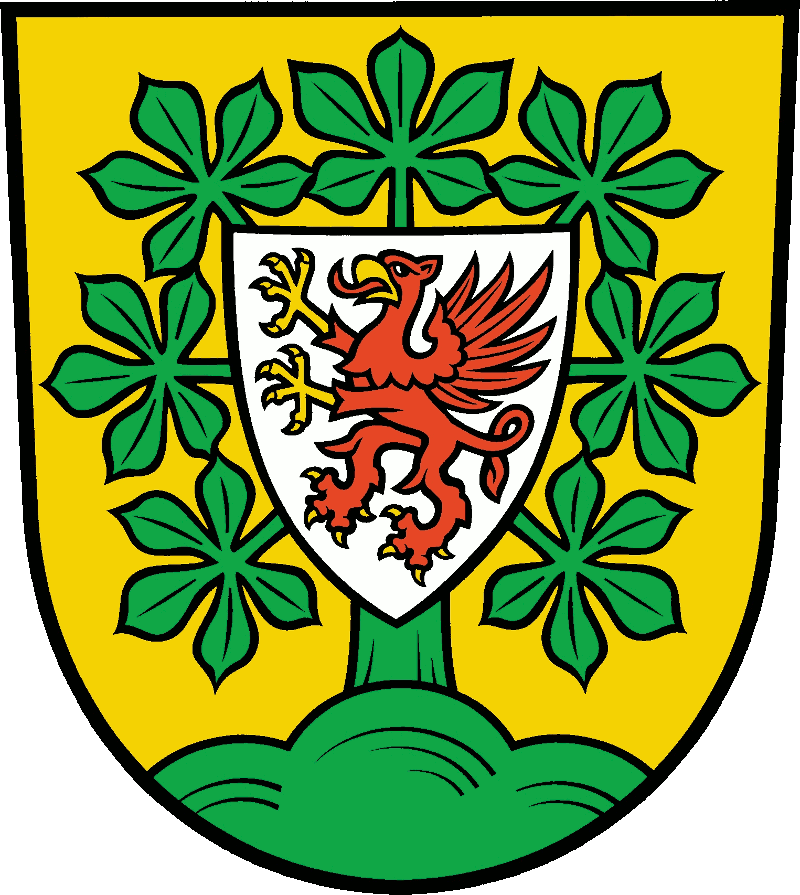
- Coat of arms

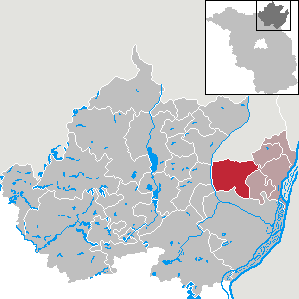
- Location of Casekow within Uckermark district
- Interactive map of Casekow
- Location within Germany Location within Brandenburg
- Coordinates: 53°13′00″N 14°13′00″E
- Country: Germany
- State: Brandenburg
- District: Uckermark
- Municipal assoc.: Gartz (Oder)

Government
  - Mayor (2024–29): Tino Kisicki

Area
  - Total: 94.10 km^{2} (36.33 sq mi)
- Elevation: 22 m (72 ft)

Population (2025-12-31)
  - Total: 1,733
  - Density: 18.42/km^{2} (47.70/sq mi)
- Time zone: UTC+01:00 (CET)
  - Summer (DST): UTC+02:00 (CEST)
- Postal codes: 16306
- Dialling codes: 033331
- Vehicle registration: UM
- Website: www.gartz.de

Casekow is a municipality in the Uckermark district, in Germany.

== Geography ==
The western border of the municipal area is formed by the river Randow, in the north the area of the small town of Penkun in Western Pomerania borders on Casekow. From the west the terrain rises from the Randowbruch over a forested terminal moraine (Blumberger Wald) by about 40 meters. Numerous small lakes and ponds lie in the depressions of the hilly area. The main village of Casekow lies on the Landgraben, which first flows northeast, turns southwest at Tantow and flows into the Westoder at Gartz (Oder). The nearest larger German town is Schwedt/Oder at a distance of about 20 km, the nearest larger Polish town is Szczecin.

Casekow is surrounded by the neighboring communities of Penkun to the north, Tantow and Gartz (Oder) to the northeast, Hohenselchow-Groß Pinnow to the east, Schwedt/Oder to the south, Zichow to the southwest, Gramzow to the west, and Randowtal to the northwest.

== History ==
From 1648 to 1720, Casekow was part of Swedish Pomerania. From 1720 to 1945, it was part of the Prussian Province of Pomerania, from 1945 to 1952 of the State of Mecklenburg-Vorpommern, from 1952 to 1990 of the Bezirk Frankfurt of East Germany and since 1990 of Brandenburg.

== Demography ==
Development of Population since 1875 within the Current Boundaries (Blue Line: Population; Dotted Line: Comparison to Population Development of Brandenburg state; Grey Background: Time of Nazi rule; Red Background: Time of Communist rule)

Casekow: Population development
within the current boundaries (2020)

Year	Pop.	±% p.a.
1875	2,626	—
1890	2,619	−0.02%
1910	2,700	+0.15%
1925	3,362	+1.47%
1933	3,239	−0.46%
1939	3,349	+0.56%
1946	5,149	+6.34%
1950	5,159	+0.05%
1964	3,658	−2.43%
1971	3,540	−0.47%
1981	2,899	−1.98%
1985	2,788	−0.97%
1989	2,751	−0.33%
1990	2,728	−0.84%
1991	2,696	−1.17%

Year	Pop.	±% p.a.
1992	3,011	+11.68%
1993	2,905	−3.52%
1994	2,684	−7.61%
1995	2,692	+0.30%
1996	2,654	−1.41%
1997	2,612	−1.58%
1998	2,576	−1.38%
1999	2,579	+0.12%
2000	2,535	−1.71%
2001	2,491	−1.74%
2002	2,517	+1.04%
2003	2,452	−2.58%
2004	2,404	−1.96%
2005	2,345	−2.45%
2006	2,260	−3.62%

Year	Pop.	±% p.a.
2007	2,225	−1.55%
2008	2,200	−1.12%
2009	2,179	−0.95%
2010	2,166	−0.60%
2011	1,953	−9.83%
2012	1,941	−0.61%
2013	1,928	−0.67%
2014	1,908	−1.04%
2015	1,893	−0.79%
2016	1,894	+0.05%
2017	1,890	−0.21%
2018	1,918	+1.48%
2019	1,885	−1.72%
2020	1,870	−0.80%
