= Berlin–Szczecin railway =

Railway line in Germany and Poland

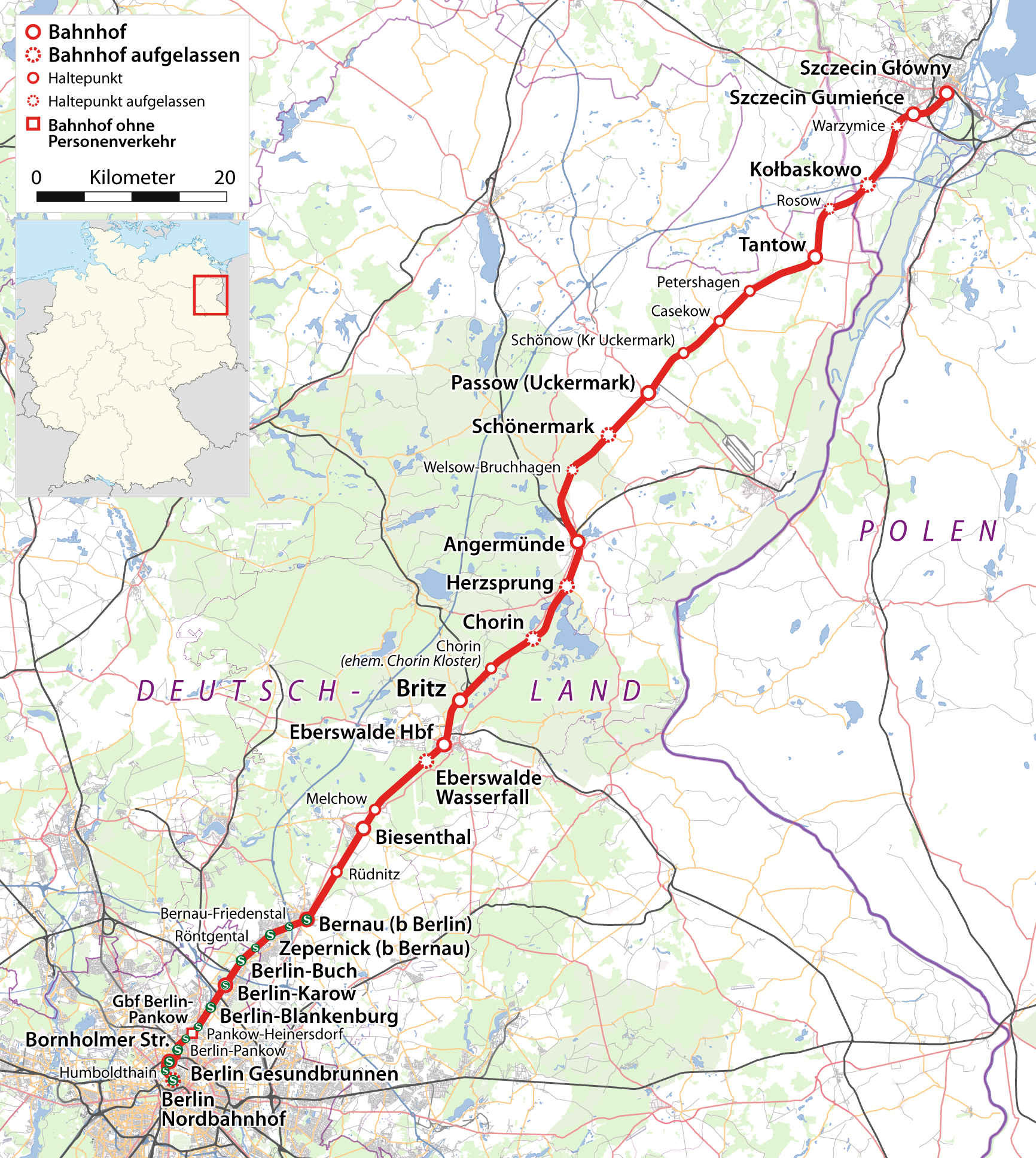

Overview
- Line number: 6002 S-Bahn Berlin; 6081 Gesundbr.–Angermünde; 6328 Angermünde–national border; 409 national border–Szczecin Gumieńce; 408 Sz. Gumieńce-Szczecin Gł
- Locale: Germany and Poland
- Termini: Szczecin; Berlin Gesundbrunnen

Service
- Route number: 200.2 Nordbf.–Bernau; 200.8 Bornh. Str–Blankenburg; 203 Berlin–Angermünde; 209.60 Berlin–Eberswalde Hbf; 209.66 Angermünde–Szczecin Gł

Technical
- Line length: 134.5 km (83.6 mi)
- Number of tracks: 2:Nordbahnhof–Buch (S-Bahn); 2: Gesundbrunnen–Blankenburg; 2: Berlin-Karow–Passow; 2: Sz. Gumieńce-Szczecin Gł (part)
- Track gauge: 1,435 mm (4 ft 8 1/2 in) standard gauge
- Electrification: Berlin S-Bahn: 750 V DC third rail; Berlin–Passow: 15 kV/16.7 Hz AC catenary; Sz. Gumieńce-Szczecin Gł: 3 kV DC
- Maximum incline: 0.4%

The Berlin–Szczecin railway, also known in German as the Stettiner Bahn (Stettin Railway), is a mainline railway connecting the German capital of Berlin with the Polish port city of Szczecin. It is one of the oldest lines in Germany.

It was built by the Berlin-Stettin Railway Company under the Kingdom of Prussia in 1842 and 1843 and was the company's trunk line. The line was duplicated between Berlin and Angermünde in 1863 and between Angermünde and Szczecin in 1873.

The line is still used by regional trains on the Berlin–Angermünde route (some to or from Stralsund) and on the Angermünde–Szczecin route as well as the long-distance trains on the entire Berlin–Szczecin line. Between central Berlin and the suburban station of Bernau the line also has its own suburban tracks used by the Berlin S-Bahn. The line is also a major route for the transport of freight between Germany and Poland. Except for the section between Passow and Szczecin Gumieńce the entire route is electrified.

== Route ==
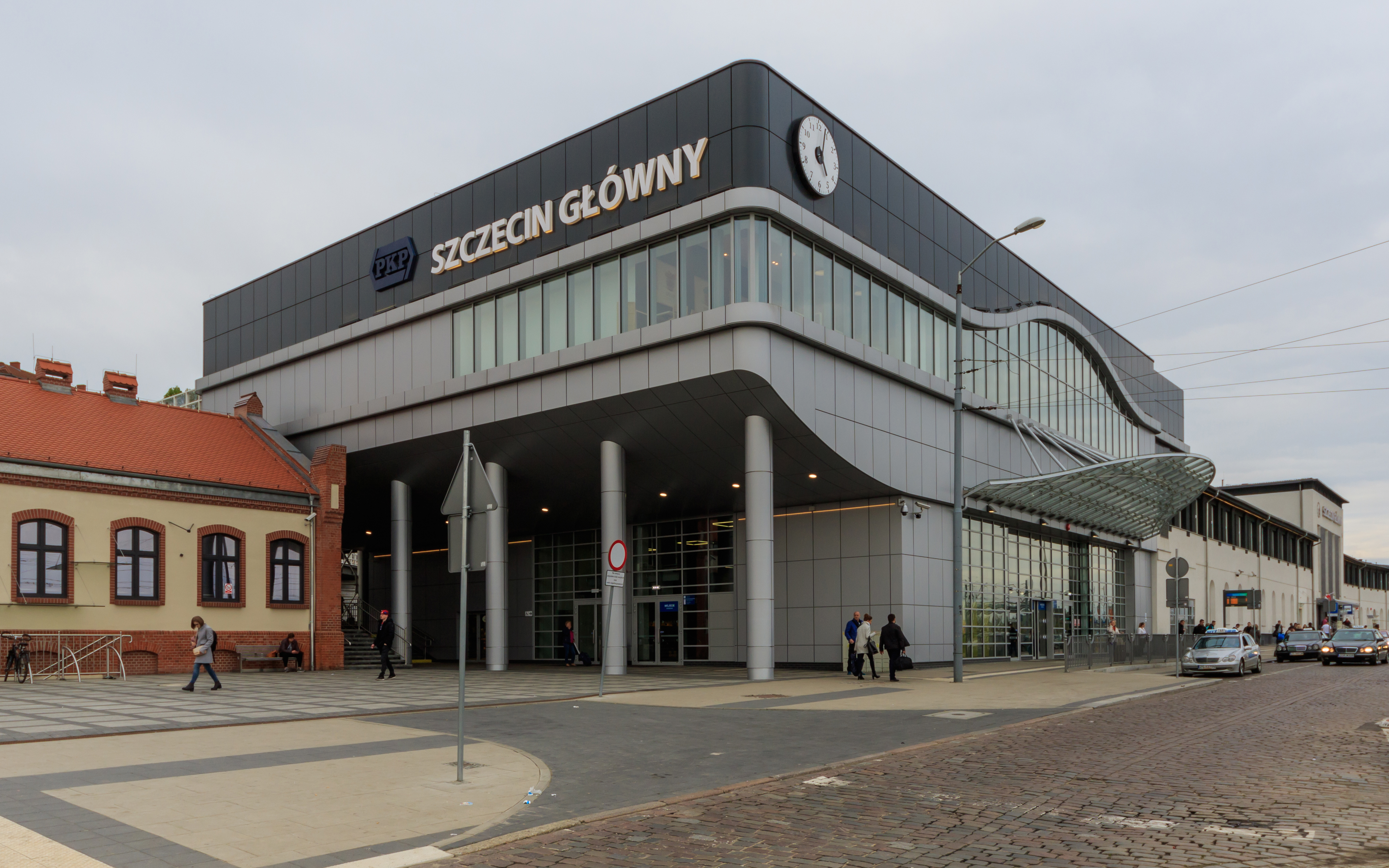
Szczecin main railway station

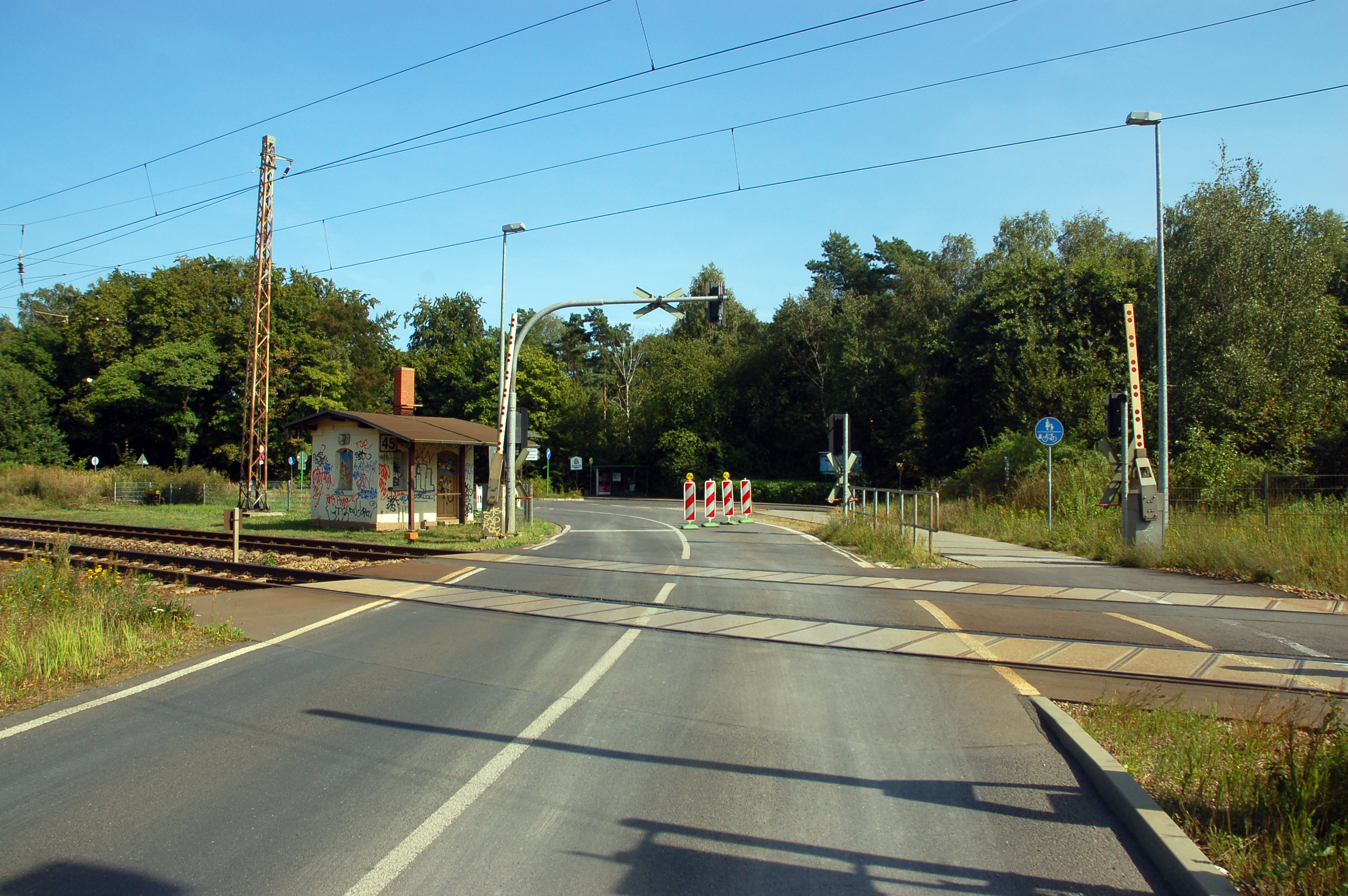
Former Eberswalde Wasserfall station

The route originally began at Stettiner Bahnhof (Stettin station)—renamed in 1952 as Nordbahnhof (North station)—to the north of central Berlin. The track first runs briefly to the northwest and then turns toward the northeast. Near the current Berlin Ringbahn and the Prussian Northern Railway, the line formerly had a separate alignment, but this was abandoned in 1897. Since then, the line has run along the Ringbahn and along the Northern Railway to Bornholmer Straße where it returns to the old alignment. Before reaching the Berlin city limits north of Buch, the line has no significant curves.

At Bernau the line swings briefly to the east to avoid the medieval centre. As far as Angermünde it runs largely parallel with federal highway B2, which it crosses several times. To the north of the town of Eberswalde is the tunnel under the Oder–Havel Canal (Hohenzollern Canal): one of the most important engineering structures on the line.

The last section of the line turns a little more to the east towards the Oder river. In the last few kilometres before the border with Poland the line comes within a few hundred metres of the state border of Mecklenburg-Vorpommern without actually crossing it. About three kilometres beyond Rosow, and 119.6 km from the beginning of the line, the line crosses the German-Polish border. In Szczecin Gumieńce, the railway joins the Bützow–Szczecin railway and then runs to Szczecin central station.

The station's placement reflects the reasons for the line's construction: it is located on the banks of the Oder at the foot of the hill on which the centre of the city is located. The station building does not face the city, but rather the promenade next to the quay. The line was Berlin's first fast connection to the sea, which connected Prussia to the rest of world by steamship from Stettin.

== History ==
=== Private railway era ===
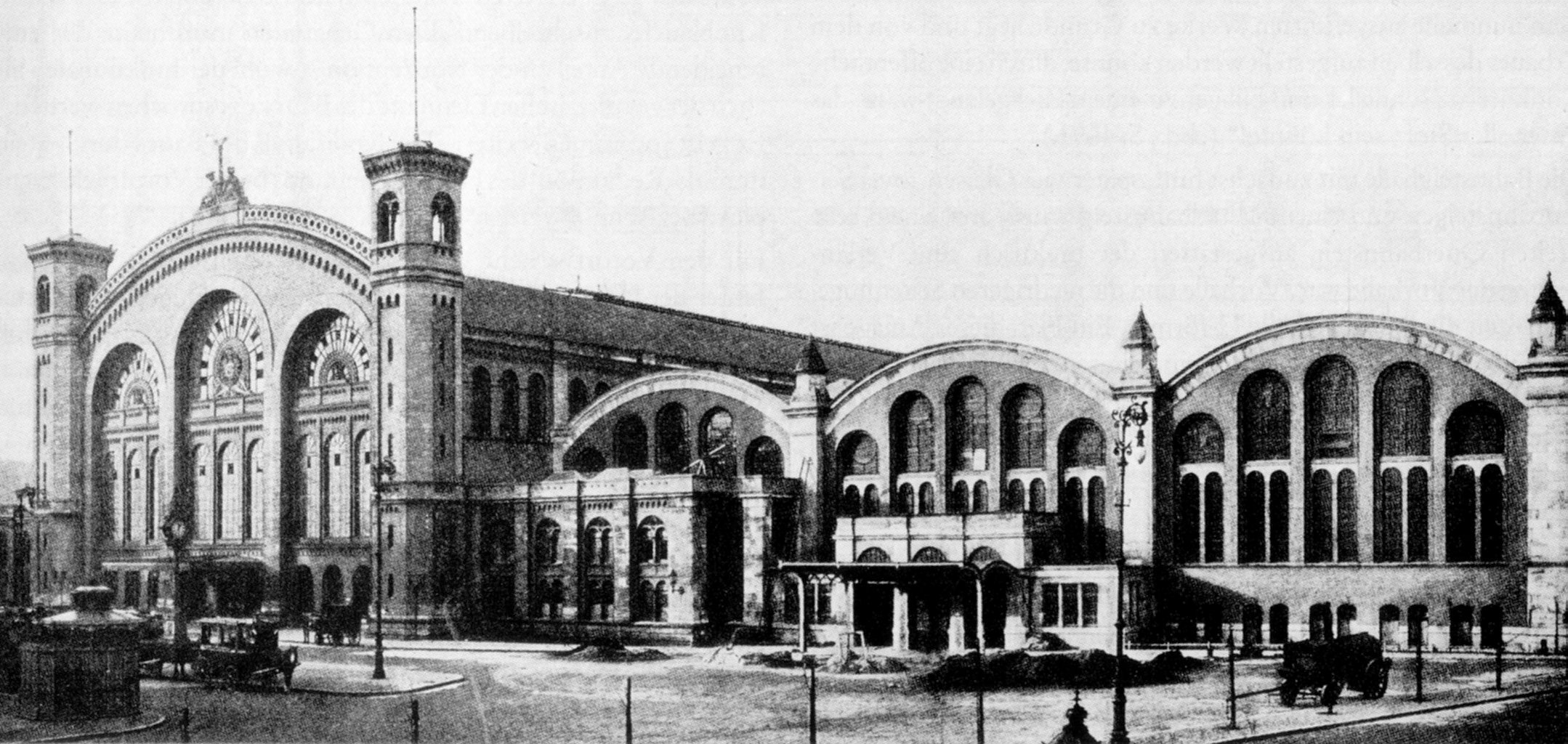
The Stettiner Bahnhof in Berlin in 1904

The Berlin-Stettin Railway Company (German: Berlin-Stettiner Eisenbahn-Gesellschaft, BStE) was founded in Berlin in March 1836 by a number of businessmen with the aim of building a railway from Berlin to Stettin. It was hoped that 39,000 people and 20,000 tons of freight would be transported annually and that with an estimated construction cost of 2.5 million thalers this would provide a return of just over five percent. On 10 July 1836, an interim licence was granted for the railway.

The cost in the final draft was 2.724 million thalers. The increase was largely due to upgraded standards, such as the use of better structures and the placement of the Stettin station next to the Oder in the middle of the business district. Since it had only sold shares worth 1.037 million thalers, it was taken over by the old Pomeranian local parliament, which guaranteed a return for six years, and the sum of 500,000 thalers was invested by the citizens of Stettin and neighbouring landowners. The final concession was issued on 12 October 1840. During the acquisition of land, provision was made for doubling the track, and the track base and the larger structures were prepared accordingly. At a general meeting of the company on 26 May 1842, it was decided to continue the line to Stargard in Pomerania.

On 1 August 1842 the Berlin–Eberswalde section was opened and it was extended to Angermünde on 15 November 1842. The entire 134,7 km long Berlin–Stettin line was officially opened on 15 August 1843.

The first time table provided for two pairs of passenger trains per day, taking four hours and 20 to 30 minutes, and one pair of cargo trains taking five hours and 21 minutes (in the Berlin-Stettin direction) and 45 minutes in the other direction.

On 1 May 1846 the line was extended by the opening of the Stettin–Stargard section. The Berlin station in Stettin was transformed into a through station. The opening of the Prussian Eastern Railway’s Krzyż–Piła– Bydgoszcz line in 1851 benefited the Szczecin Railway as the two lines were connected via the extension of the Szczecin–Stargard line to Krzyż in 1848 (or 1849). After the opening of the Eastern Railway's Krzyż–Kostrzyn–Frankfurt (Oder)–Berlin line in 1857, all of the Eastern Railway's traffic to Berlin was transferred to that line.

The second track from Berlin to Angermünde was put into operation on 22 December 1863 and on 1 August 1873 the work which had begun in 1872 on doubling the Angermünde–Stettin–Stargard line was completed. On 1 February 1880 the BStE was nationalised and became part of Prussian state railways.

=== State railway era ===
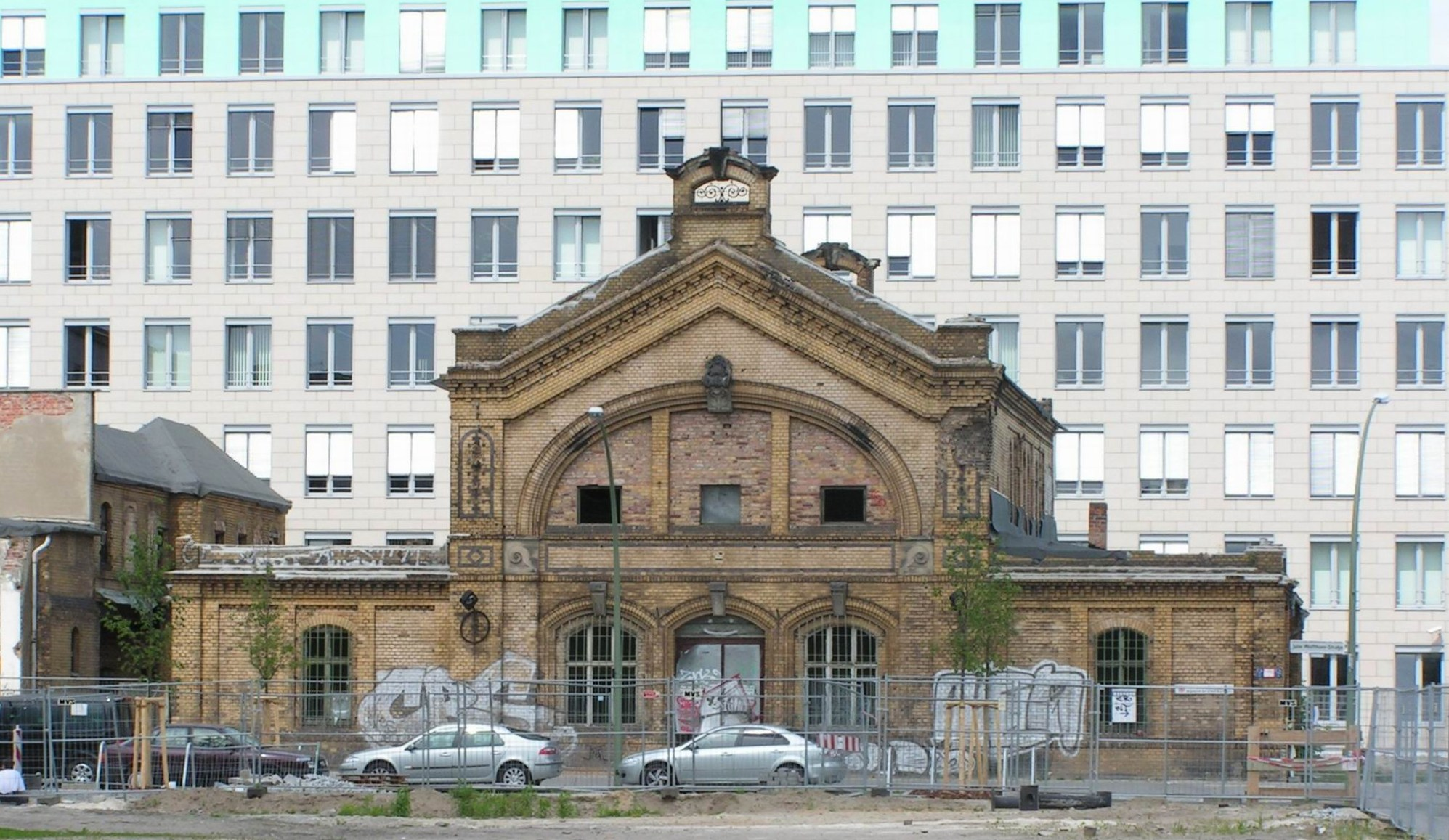
Remains of the old Stettiner station

On 12 December 1897 the line along Grüntaler Straße in the Berlin district of Wedding, which had several level crossings, was moved on to the route of the Ringbahn to connect with the new transfer station of Gesundbrunnen. At Bornholmer Straße the line then branched off the line of the Prussian Northern Railway to the east. Freight tracks on the section had already been opened on 1 May 1897.

Between 1903 and 1906, the Stettiner station was expanded and converted to accommodate suburban train services.

The rapid growth of road transport at the beginning of the twentieth century led to chaotic conditions at level crossings, requiring the separation of the modes. This was carried out in several stages between 1912 and 1916 by creating embankments from Berlin to Bernau and separating long-distance and suburban tracks. The planned electrification of the suburban railways was not implemented for the time being, owing to World War I.

=== 1918–1945 ===
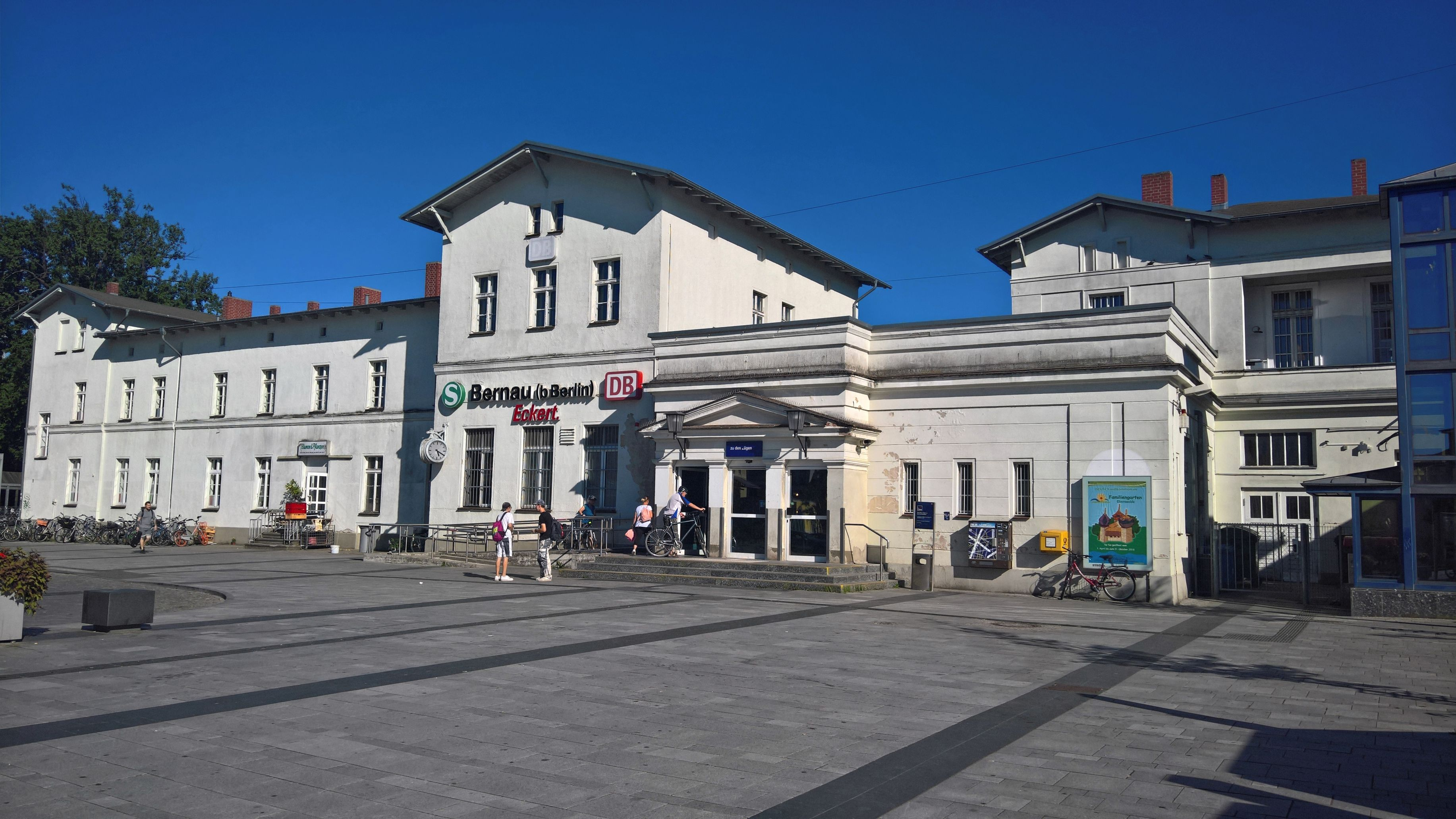
Bernau station

Shortly after the First World War, the suburban railways were electrified. Originally it had been planned to use the usual German AC system of overhead electrification with 16.7 kilovolts and 15 hertz. However, while construction work was in full swing – in Pankow the first electric pylons had already been erected –German Railways decided in favour of a DC system with side-contact conductor rail at 750 volts. The hyperinflation of 1923 delayed construction, however, allowing completion to take place only in summer of 1924. On 8 August 1924, the first electric commuter train line was opened between the Stettiner suburban station and Bernau. Since 1 December 1930, this line has formed part of the Berlin S-Bahn.

As one of public works projects to reduce the unemployment figures, launched after the Nazis' conquest of power in 1933, the long discussed project of a north–south transversal S-Bahn link was decided in 1933, and started to be implemented in 1934, linking the three northern suburban lines terminating at the Stettiner Bahnhof with the three southern suburban lines terminating at Potsdamer Bahnhof, by a tunnel from Stettiner Bahnhof to Anhalter Bahnhof. Two new stations were built in the north, at Bornholmer Straße and Humboldthain; the suburban terminal, placed on the west side of the Stettiner Bahnhof was replaced by an underground station placed on the East side of the station. The first phase of the North-South Tunnel was opened in June 1936, just in time for the 1936 Olympic games in Berlin.

=== After 1945 ===
The end of the Second World War had serious implications for the route. The line's second track was dismantled to provide reparations to the Soviet Union. Although Stettin, lying on the west bank of the Oder was supposed to remain part of Germany by the terms decided at the Potsdam Agreement, with Soviet approval Polish troops seized the city in 1945 in order to control the entire mouth of the river. The once-popular route to Germany's third-biggest port, often also used by Germans vacationing on the Baltic, fell into irrelevance and disrepair. Cross-border traffic between Angermünde and Szczecin declined significantly after the war, as Szczecin's German-speaking population had been expelled in totality. Passenger services were soon limited to one train a day.

In 1950 the line's terminus in Berlin was renamed Nordbahnhof (North Station). The closure of the station on 18 May 1952 meant the temporary end of rail operations on the Szczecin Railway in West Berlin. The trains then ran on the Berlin outer ring to Berlin-Lichtenberg station and the Berlin Stadtbahn.

In the 1980s, the line from Berlin-Pankow to Passow was electrified. Also equipped with overhead electrification were the adjacent long-distance lines of the Ringbahn and the Berlin outer ring, the Passow–Stendell line to service the PCK oil refinery as well as the line to Stralsund that branches off at Angermünde. The section between Passow and Szczecin remained unelectrified.

=== Reunification era ===
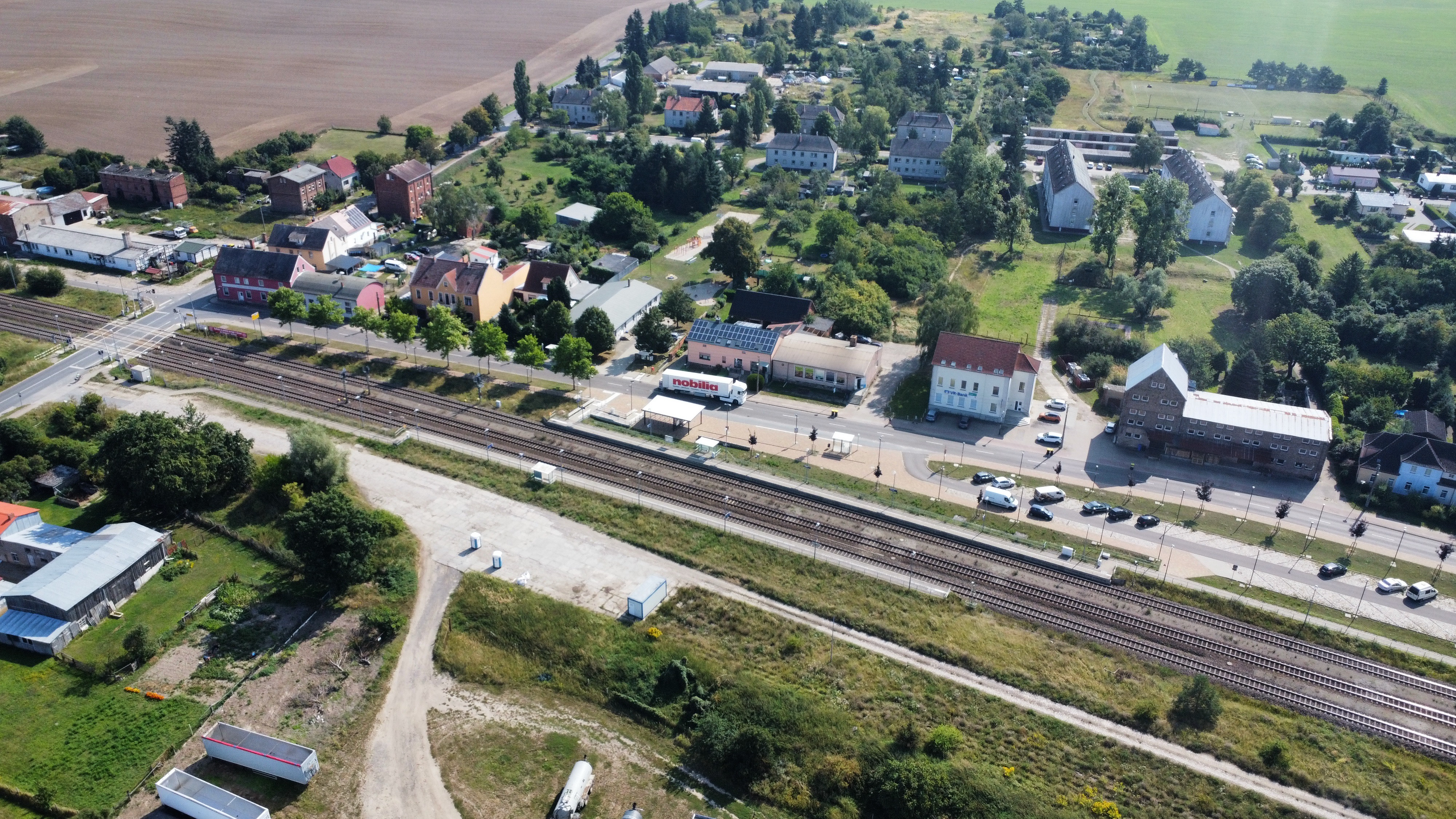
Tantow station

Since the opening of the new Berlin Hauptbahnhof (central station) on 27 May 2006 trains again run through Gesundbrunnen station to the new North-South mainline so that travellers on the Szczecin line now take the shortest route to the centre of Berlin.

Despite European integration the railway track is in poor condition especially between Angermünde and Szczecin. Between Passow and Szczecin Gumieńce it is still single-track and unelectrified. The doubling, electrification and upgrading of the entire route to allow running at 160 km/h begun in 2021, funded by the federal government of Germany (€380M), and the federal states of Berlin and Brandenburg (€50M each)
