= Passow, Brandenburg =

Passow
- Ortsteil of Schwedt
- Interactive map of Passow
- Location within Germany Location within Brandenburg
- Coordinates: 53°08′28″N 14°06′43″E
- Country: Germany
- State: Brandenburg
- District: Uckermark
- Town: Schwedt

Area
  - Total: 51.38 km^{2} (19.84 sq mi)
- Elevation: 15 m (49 ft)
- Time zone: UTC+01:00 (CET)
  - Summer (DST): UTC+02:00 (CEST)
- Postal codes: 16306
- Dialling codes: 033331, 033336
- Vehicle registration: UM

Passow (German pronunciation: [ˈpasoː]) is a former municipality in the Uckermark district, in Brandenburg, Germany. Since 19 April 2022, it is an Ortsteil of the town Schwedt. The former municipality Passow also contained the Ortsteile Briest, Jamikow and Schönow.

== Demography ==
Development of population since 1875 within the current boundaries (Blue line: Population; Dotted line: Comparison to population development of Brandenburg state; Grey background: Time of Nazi rule; Red background: Time of communist rule)

Passow [Uckermark]: Population development
within the current boundaries (2017)

Year	Pop.	±% p.a.
1875	1,858	—
1890	1,789	−0.25%
1910	1,829	+0.11%
1925	1,935	+0.38%
1933	1,865	−0.46%
1939	1,790	−0.68%
1946	2,548	+5.17%
1950	2,650	+0.99%
1964	1,952	−2.16%
1971	2,037	+0.61%
1981	1,894	−0.73%
1985	1,820	−0.99%
1989	1,838	+0.25%
1990	1,826	−0.65%

Year	Pop.	±% p.a.
1991	1,806	−1.10%
1992	1,798	−0.44%
1993	1,797	−0.06%
1994	1,776	−1.17%
1995	1,774	−0.11%
1996	1,783	+0.51%
1997	1,798	+0.84%
1998	1,839	+2.28%
1999	1,840	+0.05%
2000	1,866	+1.41%
2001	1,801	−3.48%
2002	1,752	−2.72%
2003	1,724	−1.60%
2004	1,713	−0.64%

Year	Pop.	±% p.a.
2005	1,717	+0.23%
2006	1,672	−2.62%
2007	1,619	−3.17%
2008	1,622	+0.19%
2009	1,611	−0.68%
2010	1,585	−1.61%
2011	1,537	−3.03%
2012	1,533	−0.26%
2013	1,510	−1.50%
2014	1,469	−2.72%
2015	1,473	+0.27%
2016	1,464	−0.61%
2017	1,454	−0.68%
