= Flügel =

Flügel, Flugel or Fluegel (which means wing in German) may refer to:

== People ==
listed alphabetically by first name

- Barbara Flügel, contemporary German artist
- Darlanne Fluegel (1958–2017), American model and actress
- Ernst Flügel (1844–1912), German Romantic composer
- Ewald Flügel (1863–1914), German-American professor at Stanford University
- Gustav Flügel (Carl Gustav Flügel, 1812–1900), German composer
- Gustav Leberecht Flügel (1802–1870), German orientalist
- Johann Gottfried Flügel (1788–1855), German lexicographer
- John Flügel (1884–1955), British experimental psychologist
- Julian Flügel (born 1986), German long-distance runner
- Otto Flügel (1842–1914), German philosopher and theologian

== Music ==
- Flugel, the "wing" or tenor joint of the bassoon
- Flugel, short for the flugelhorn
- Name for the harpsichord in the 18th and early 19th centuries
- Name for the pianoforte
- "Weiß Flügel", a 2008 single by Yousei Teikoku

== Other ==
- Der Flügel, a far-right faction within the political party Alternative for Germany
- Yokohama Flügels, a defunct Japanese football (soccer) club
- Fictional angel-like humanoid species from No Game No Life.
