= Karl Kehrbach =

German pedagogue

Karl Kehrbach (22 August 1846, Neustadt an der Orla – 21 October 1905, Charlottenburg) was a German pedagogue best known as editor of the multi-volume Monumenta Germaniae Paedagogica.

He studied pedagogy at the University of Leipzig, and from 1874 was a member of Tuiskon Ziller's educational seminar. For several years he worked as a teacher, and for a period of time served as a librarian at the University of Halle. From 1883 he lived in Berlin-Charlottenburg as a private scholar, receiving the title of professor in 1894. He was a founder of the Gesellschaft für deutsche Erziehungs- und Schulgeschichte (Society for German Education and School History), of which he was an editor of its periodical, Mitteilungen.

== Published works ==
- From 1886 onward, he was editor of the Monumenta Germaniae Paedagogica, which at the time of his death in 1905 had grown to 32 volumes (1938, 62 volumes).
- In 1887 he began edition of Johann Friedrich Herbart's writings, Sämtliche werke in chronologischer Reihenfolge (Collected works in chronological order). After Kehrbach's death the project was continued by Otto Flügel (volumes 11–19) and Theodor Fritzsch (volumes 16–19).
- From 1877 to 1884 he issued editions of the major works of Immanuel Kant in Reclam's Universal-Bibliothek.
