= Gustav Flügel =

German composer (1812–1900)

Carl Gustav Flügel (2 July 1812 – 15 August 1900) was a German composer.

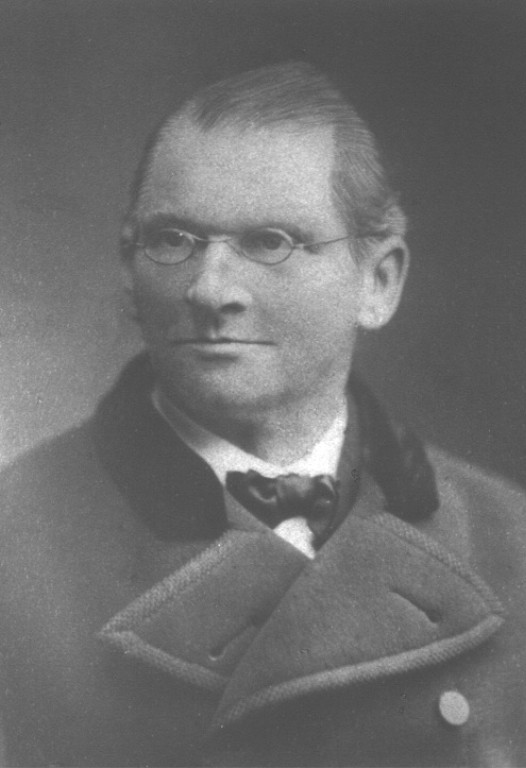
Gustav Flügel (1812–1900) around 1860

== Life and work ==
=== Ancestors and childhood ===
Flügel was born on 2 July 1812 in Nienburg an der Saale as the son of the ducal ferryman Johann Karl Flügel (1770–1828) and his third wife Johanna Friederike Heinze (1786–1855). The parents had married in 1809, the mother came from a family of locksmiths and schoolmasters. Apart from an older brother who died early (1810), Flügel had three younger siblings, Auguste (born 1814), Carl (1823–1833) and Friederike (born 1824).

Gustav was "destined for music" by his father.

The father had already sung as a poor boy in the church choir at Köthen, "and had, since he possessed a fine musical ear, occasionally had to act as soloist."

"Flügel's father was, in fact, a thoroughly musically inclined nature, which is evident from the fact that, without ever having had regular lessons, he had acquired some skill on various instruments, and knew how to tune the piano purely." Flügel himself writes of his father:

"My father's love for music was incomprehensibly great, he was able to make great sacrifices for it. I can still hear him playing the violin at vespers. It is touching how, only by ear, he tried to expose me to chorales, went to church with me on Sundays, also visited with me the churches in the vicinity, where I tried my musical strength; gave me the opportunity to hear concerts and copied many musical works for me; brought the town musician from Staßfurt with his people to play music with them."

The father was revered by Flügel throughout his life. Even in old age, he commemorated the day of his death. Flügel, on the other hand, only mentions his mother in passing. Yet she may well have contributed a great deal to her son's musicality. In this context, a passage from a later essay by Flügel is of interest: What means does a tenderly loving mother use to soothe her crying child when no other means will do? She sings a little song to her darling, even if her voice is rusty; and the child becomes calm under the mother's singing; it is as if the child's soul is immediately touched and soothed by the tones of the mother's voice.

Flügel received his first organ lessons from the cantor Thiele, the father of the organ virtuoso Louis Thiele, whom he was soon allowed to replace on the organ bench during the summer holidays. From 1822, he attended the grammar school in Bernburg and continued his organ lessons in the churches there. The octogenarian spoke of this time as his "first musical love".

=== Studies under Fr. Schneider in Dessau (1827–1830) ===
From 1827 to 1830 he studied music under Friedrich Schneider in Dessau, who generously supported the young musician. In the summer of 1828, Flügel performed his first work with friends in the Nienburg "Schwan": Der Gang nach dem Eisenhammer (after Schiller) for solo voices, choir and piano. His father died in Nienburg as early as January 1829.

Dessau provided the aspiring musician with role models and inspiration through concerts by musical greats of the time, impressing him among others Henriette Sontag, Adolf Friedrich Hesse and Niccolò Paganini. "I have never again experienced a more wonderful crescendo and decrescendo," Flügel wrote in his autobiography in 1882.

Together with Julius Schubring, Flügel studied unprinted organ compositions by Johann Sebastian Bach, whom he revered throughout his life.

=== Nienburg, Bernburg, Köthen (1830–1836) ===
Between 1830 and 1836, he worked as a music teacher in Nienburg, Bernburg and Köthen. IThere, he also substituted for the sick organist at the newly built Catholic Church by Gottfried Bandhauer, and could also have taken over his position if he had been "able to bring himself to become Catholic".

On 26 June 1835, the young Flügel visited Robert Schumann (first mention in the Neue Zeitschrift für Musik), with whom he kept in touch by letter and in person for years to come. (The Nachtfalter Op. 16 is dedicated to Clara Schumann).

=== Magdeburg (1836) ===
On Schumann's advice, Flügel moved to Magdeburg in April 1836, where Richard Wagner was also working at the city theatre at the time. There, Flügel also met his future wife, the piano teacher Minna Oppermann (1813–1847). They wrote songs, piano sonatas and several (now lost) string quartets, which were performed in private. Two of Flügel's letters to Schumann were printed anonymously in the Neue Zeitschrift für Musik and are thus the earliest surviving testimony of Flügel as a music writer:

- * * A.e.Br. Magdeburg. 23 June "I would have liked to write you a lot about the musical activity here, but music is practised here very quietly and only by a few seriously. Everything is schoolmasterly and too prosaic. The Singverein is rehearsing for the Braunschweig Music Festival. The young music society was close to being dissolved, but it still exists, but is especially little attended now. The HH. Gebrüder Ganz from Berlin have been expected here for several weeks. – A great loss for Magdeburg's musical life is the departure of Schappler, violoncellist, a very talented young man, who intends to go to Leipzig at the end of July or August. – On 9 June, The Creation was performed in Burg with a full house and the hall heated to 27°C. Teacher Kühne conducted. Kühne led the studies and performance, Schappler and Maizier (violinist) from Magdeburg participated. The performance, with so few means and so much zeal, deserves all encouragement."
- * * A. e. Br. Magdeburg. Early August. – You will certainly have read about the important fires in Magdeburg? These also set the musical firemen in motion again. The Singverein gave a concert for the burned down. The music society will soon follow. Among others, Spontini's Overture to Olympia 60 fingering for three grand piano instruments will be performed; also the great scene of the second act with chorus; furthermore, the C minor quartet by Mozart (written in April 1787); Finale from Oberon, etc. – In addition to the various musical societies, there is also a quartet for string instruments here, in which Beethoven's works in this genre are performed in weekly private meetings. In this quartet, Maizier and Fischer alternately play the first violin, Mühling Jr. and Schefter the second violin, Wendt the viola and Schappler the cello. Each member contributes his or her share to the success of the whole and all are inspired by the best will. Every art lover is also welcomed. [...] - On the eve of the 3rd of August, a concert was organised by Mr. M.D. Wachsmann in the Domsaal. A Beethoven piano concerto was played with great skill by a high school student, Mr. Weick, a pupil of Ehrlich. – Mr. M.D. Wachsmann is a zealous promoter of classical music, he works unseen, in silence. If only he had more means at his disposal."

=== Schönebeck a.E. (1838–1840) ===
In the spring of 1838, Flügel was invited by the board of the singing society in Schönebeck to settle there and take over the directorship. He accepted the post at the end of March 1838 and thus gained his first permanent position, although he continued to work as a music teacher on the side and probably had to remain so. "And I was all the more willing to do so, since this brought me back into the vicinity of those Magdeburg musicians who were friends of mine and with whom I had previously had much friendly contact. At the end of March I left Köthen and moved to the town already known to me through Ruprecht" known Schönebeck over. What could be more natural than to pay a visit to the neighbouring Magdeburg after finishing the establishment? – Through Schefter, I had been introduced to the Oppermann family, where music was diligently played; Fräulein Minna, who also gave music lessons, played Beethoven's Piano Sonata No. 3 op. 53 for me at that time; however, she was not only well-musical, but, with a thorough education*), possessed a spirit directed towards the noble and high."

"When I gave my first concert in Schönebeck on 8 May 1838 with the participation of Schefter, Schapler, Wendt and Fischer, I was able to present Fräulein Minna Oppermann to my friends as my bride and on 11 September of the same year we were married in St. Jacobi's Church in Magdeburg. Herewith begins a whole new chapter of my life"

On 11 September 1838, Flügel married Wilhelmine (Minna) Oppermann in St. Jacobi in Magdeburg. A year of quiet domestic happiness followed.

"We lived quietly and in seclusion, restricting ourselves as much as possible. Apart from my friend from Schönebeck, Friedrich Ebeling, who later came to Halberstadt as a pastor, it was especially the musical Grunow family with whom we enjoyed socialising. Private lessons, the direction of the singing society, with which I performed Spohr's 'Jessonda' and Anacker's 'Miner's Greeting'**), continued cultivation of piano playing for concert events, as well as occupation with musical composition took up all my time. For my recreation I sometimes went to the quartet in Magdeburg and the Magdeburgers also came to us in Schönebeck. Thus the first year of our marriage passed in very happy cohabitation." In October, Flügel conducted a performance by the Gesangverein of Hallelujah (Handel), finale from Don Giovanni and choruses from Christ on the Mount of Olives. But the happiness was short-lived. "On 5 October 1839 a boy was born to us. From then on, a very gloomy time began for us. – My wife, probably as a result of her not easy delivery, was thrown onto a long and heavy bed of sickness; at the same time I had to endure a gastric-nervous fever with a relapse – we were in trouble and distress".

Flügel decided to open up a new sphere of activity in a larger city. The choice fell on Stettin. "Through the Grunow family in Schönebeck, I was recommended to Frau Emma Grunow in Stettin, and this musically highly educated lady arranged for me to move to Stettin at the end of March 1840. I had to leave my wife and child behind for the time being; they were kindly received by my parents-in-law in Magdeburg."

=== First period in Stettin (1840–1850) ===
In 1840, Flügel moved to Stettin, where he worked as a private music teacher in the first houses of the city (Wilsnach, Lobedan, Schallehn etc.) and came into contact with the notabilities of the city (bishop Carl Ritschl, Carl August Dohrn). In the first four years, he conducted concert opera performances. Flügel gained general recognition as a composer of piano pieces, his breakthrough coming in 1846 with the Sonatas Op. 4 and 7. Within five years (1845–1849), Flügel published no fewer than 26 works.

In Leipzig he visited Schumann, Mendelssohn and Brendel. His contacts with the most eminent musicians were reflected in the dedications of his works, including Liszt (Op. 5), Clara Schumann, Spohr (Sonata No. 4 Op. 20) and, last but not least, Mendelssohn, who thanked him with the kindest words for the Piano Sonata (No. 3 in B flat major Op. 13) dedicated to him.

In terms of family and health, however, Flügel lived close to disaster, which culminated in 1844 and only came to an exceedingly unhappy end with the death of his first wife Minna in 1847.

During a visit to Leipzig in the summer of 1846, Franz Brendel's grand piano inspired him to convene the first "German Tonkünstler Assembly" which took place in Leipzig on 13 and 14 August 1847 with about 150 participants. Elisabeth Brendel performed Flügel's still unprinted Piano Sonata Op. 20 from the manuscript, "a very interesting work which met with much applause" Flügel himself founded the Stettin branch of the Tonkünstlerverein in 1848 together with Carl Koßmaly, which organised concerts and lectures.

In 1848, Flügel became a contributor to the Neue Zeitschrift für Musik and published there and in other journals a large number of reviews and also essays on music theory.

=== Seminary music teacher in Neuwied (1850–1859) ===
In 1850, he was appointed seminary music teacher in Neuwied, where he also gave piano lessons to Elisabeth of Wied, later Queen of Romania ("Carmen Sylva"). Nevertheless, Flügel's time in Neuwied was torn between the greatest honours, the vilest vituperations and lasting successes.

At first, Flügel was swamped with official work as a seminary music teacher, which included playing the organ. This was also reflected in his declining compositional activity. He liked to dedicate the works he wrote here to his superiors (Bühring, Landfermann) and to the Prussian royal family, to the Princess of Prussia the Concertouverture (Op. 26) and to the Prince of Prussia the Lieder Op. 35. Under Flügel's direction, Hoffmann von Fallersleben, who was living in Neuwied at the time, was appointed honorary member of the Liedertafel. On 1 September 1853, the then completely unknown Johannes Brahms visited the famous composer Flügel and spent the day with him partly outdoors, partly at the piano.

After a brilliant start, in 1853 – much like Schumann in Düsseldorf at the same time – Flügel's demands collided with the Rhinelander's need for conviviality. This led to an unpleasant quarrel, including a newspaper fight, the effects of which lingered into the last years of his time in Neuwied.

In the following period, Flügel devoted himself increasingly to composition. In the seven years from 1853 to 1859, 28 works appeared in print. He became a music teacher for the princely house of Neuwied and continued to communicate and correspond with the musical greats of the time such as Schumann, Liszt and Brahms. In 1856, he received the title of Royal Music Director and in 1858, (together with Richard Wagner), he was appointed honorary member of the Ndl. Verein zur Beförderung der Tonkunst. (The archives of the Toonkunstbiblioteek Amsterdam preserve some of Flügel's very rare original manuscripts).

His students and the Central Rhenish Teachers' Singing Society, which he founded, honoured his memory for decades. In many respects, his friendship with the pedagogue Ernst Julius Hentschel was significant, which resulted in a lively correspondence and Flügel's collaboration in the Euterpe until his death.

=== Castle organist in Szczecin (1859–1898) ===
In 1859, Flügel was appointed organist of the Schlosskirche zu Stettin. The last four decades of Flügel's life have not been described autobiographically and must be reconstructed from individual sources.

Flügel's second period in Stettin can be roughly divided into four phases according to decades:

(a) 1859–1870 Aufbau. At first Flügel built up his new place with great energy. The organ building society he founded was able to shine after only four years with a new organ built by Barnim Grüneberg. Flügel taught at the institute and founded a mixed choir. While the youngest of Flügel's children were born, his son Ernst successfully followed in his father's footsteps as a pianist and composer. There was little room for printing compositions during this time. However, the interesting chorale prelude book Op. 60 was produced.

b) 1870–1880 Consolidation. In addition to nationalistic aberrations, Flügel increasingly composed for choir in various instrumentations. He also wrote many of the important chorale preludes, including his main work, the Prelude Book Op. 72, as well as various songs. Flügel also made a name for himself as an outstanding piano and organ virtuoso. He took an extremely active part in the musical life of Stettin, which is evident among others in his extensive concert reviews of the years 1877–1882. In addition to the regular chamber music evenings, the orchestral concerts by Koßmaly/Jancovius and the choral performances by C.A. Lorenz, Flügel also attended the performances of foreign artists, mostly pianists, violinists or singers. A special event – not only for Szczecin – was the concert of the Jubilee Singers (Black Gospel music) on 8 April 1878 for the liberation of the slaves.

c) 1880–1890 Retreat and Review. As early as around 1879, massive depressive moods became apparent. Flügel withdrew more and more, both internally and externally. During this time, Flügel updated his catalogue raisonné (1880), he wrote down his memoirs and published them along with his correspondence with musicians such as Mendelssohn, Spohr, Hentschel and Kühmstedt in various journals. With the death of his son Carl (2 February 1882), Flügel stopped composing secular songs, he no longer gave private lessons and from then on concentrated strictly on his official, church duties as organist.

d) 1890–1900 Letzter Höhepunkt. In the last decade of his life, Flügel once again developed enormous creative power despite considerable physical complaints. During this period, he wrote practically all of the great concert pieces for organ, Op. 99 to 120, as well as a large number of chorale preludes (Op. 100, 115 and 121), all of which were highly acclaimed in contemporary reviews and concerts. The aged old master (affectionately known as "Papa Flügel") received much recognition from his numerous pupils and admirers.

=== Dismissal and death (1898–1900) ===
I did not think that I would live to see out my 84th year, and yet it seems so. I am devoted to the will of God, even though the decline of my bodily strength, especially of the nobler parts, is often quite annoying to me, quite apart from the pain that is connected with it. Playing the organ is completely over, I can no longer attend musical performances because my nervousness does not allow it. Writing becomes difficult for me, and yet I still have enough to be thankful for. So wrote Flügel on 30 May 1896 in a letter to his son Paul in Lübeck.

In the secondary services he now had himself substituted, for the main services he struggled up the narrow stairs to the organ.

In 1898, Flügel had to give up his work as organist altogether. Since he was not entitled to any pension even after almost 40 years as castle organist, the work was initially assigned to his successor on an honorary basis on 3 April 1898. Flügel was allowed to continue living in the official flat at Königsplatz 11.

Flügel died on 15 August 1900 in Stettin in his official residence at Königsplatz 2 at the age of 88. Of Flügel's 19 biological children, many of whom died early, only the son Ernst Flügel (born 1844, organist in Breslau) followed in his father's footsteps.

== Legacy ==
Flügel's handwritten estate, which came to Vienna via the children of his son Ernst, was lost there towards the end of the Second World War. A small number of autograph manuscripts of music are preserved in the Toonkunst Archive in Amsterdam (chorale preludes and chorale pieces). Two of the rare autograph chorale preludes can be found in the Leipzig Music Library.

Whether Flügel's 18 letters, which he wrote to the Cologne music publisher Michael Schloss (1823–1891) between July 1850 and January 1855 and which were acquired by the historical archive of the city of Cologne in 1996, were also lost forever with the collapse of the archive is currently completely unclear. 16 letters or postcards from Flügel to musician friends such as Brendel, Bock and Dörffel, as well as Mendelssohn's letter to Flügel of 19 October 1845, are preserved in the music department of the Berlin State Library, including Flügel's letter to Alfred Dörffel dated 28 April 1868. Three letters can be found in the Frankfurt University Library, and one in Munich. Two letters to and one from Louis Spohr are preserved in Kassel. A larger number of private letters from the second Stettin period are with descendants in Lübeck.

In time for the composer's 200th birthday, the Pomeranian Library in Szczecin put a large number of Flügel's original printed music online. Most of these are Flügel's hand copies, in which the composer has entered the receipt, small corrections, first performances known to him and other notices. Apparently, these valuable copies came into the library after the death of his son Ernst Flügel (1912). The Berlin State Library has also recently begun to put his works online.

== Style ==
Flügel's creative period spans around eight decades. The developments of the 19th century are reflected in him like in hardly any other composer. The spectrum ranges from the early piano sonatas oriented towards Weber and Beethoven to the late concert pieces for organ with Wagnerian colouring. Flügel follows his own style and has never allowed himself to be pinned down. The famous music theorist Johann Christian Lobe opined: "Among a hundred reviews of musical works, one might find one that is completely satisfied, one that has to acknowledge with all its heart and conviction a God-justified, original compositional talent. But among a hundred reviews, I do not know exactly how few are read. How easy it is to include among these unread ones those that would have been worth the effort of reading! This is one of the reasons why the true artistic spirit often succeeds so late, sometimes not at all, in making itself heard with its genuine sounds amidst the market bells and pimping. Therefore, one should not only try to help important artists with reviews, but should call out boldly, firmly and loudly in small leading articles to the musically surrounded world: direct your ear and your attention here, there sing and sound the ways of the heart. I am talking about Gustav Flügel." He is first and foremost he and no other. His imagination blossoms and glows in full youthful freshness. Whatever heartache and heart's desire may live in a person, from heavy-blooded night dreams through all stages to the laughing images of jest, it lives in Flügel and wells up and sounds out easily in his tone poems. He always has something before his mind's eye. That is why nowhere does mere ear candy appear, just as no common thoughtless or frivolous fashionistas dare to come near his noble artistic spirit. He asked for a very delicate artistic conscience. What the greatest masters carried in them in the way of aesthetically guiding maxims that enable art, he has eavesdropped on and absorbed into himself as laws, but he leaves them their thoughts and works his creations out of his own material. I am not weighing up here which of his works I like more or less; that is for the audience to do. I only want to write these few words as a hint for those who do not yet know Flügel but deserve to know him, and I have hinted at his artistic qualities because he has only these."

How time-bound the contemporary judgements are becomes clear in the example of a critique of Op. 25.2 by the Flügel quite well-meaning E. Bernsdorf: "In the Sea Voices we encounter a veritable confusion of figures and phrases, which are just as incapable of presenting a picture to the soul as mere splashes of colour make up a painting". Similarly to Bernstein, but much more positively, Keferstein judges Op. 16.4 At Sunset: "Very dreamy, often losing itself in itself, whereby the sharpness of the contour suffers. It reminded us of certain landscapes whose entire charm is based on the colour tone poured over them; the individual objects of the landscape only receive their charm through the unity of the colour that merges them. This is what happened to us with this rhapsody, which, interwoven with exuberance of feeling, reminds us of Robert Schumann's beautiful models. Flügel is one of those artists who have a future, and we do not meet many of them now."

It is possible that Flügel was so far ahead of his time at the time that he could well be understood as a "forerunner of Impressionism" in today's world, but it is precisely the piano works that are still awaiting rediscovery. Flügel himself pointed out in passing that the particularly positive reviews "only gave him ill-will".

Although committed to the classical school (Flügel was inclined to the strict forms of the sonata, canon and fugue throughout his life), he did not follow Brahms's appeal "Against the New Germans" (1860). In 1877, he reported enthusiastically on the performances in Bayreuth. His chorale preludes are particularly enchanting for their "high beauty of sound".

== Importance ==
Flügel's recognition as a composer spans a period of more than 60 years. Schumann calls the 22-year-old the "young Mozart" with a touch of irony. Ten years later, Flügel's piano sonatas are repeatedly mentioned in the same breath as those of Beethoven. "Truly ingenious is the final movement, in the Rondo full of Beethovenian humour [...]" Prof. L. Bischoff ventures the statement at a distance: "We do not think we are saying too much when we place Flügel's five great sonatas directly next to the sonatas of Beethoven, F. Schubert and C. M. von Weber." Flügel's variation works are placed next to those of Bach, Beethoven, Weber and Schumann. Individual character pieces by him are "among the best ever produced by the genius of an artist", (Alfred Dörffel) or are "to be placed alongside Mendelssohn's best such compositions." For Keferstein, Flügel is one of "the most capable and hopeful tone poets of the present." Ernst Hentschel counts Flügel in 1872 among the best masters of the present, for Em. Klitzsch, Flügel in 1882 possesses "a high rank among the best organ composers", Fritz Lubrich even calls the aged Flügel in 1897 'the Bismarck of organists', ...

Flügel's lasting importance lies above all in organ composition, for which he created masterly works at a time when German church music was largely in decline. He left behind an œuvre of 121 printed compositions, of which the concert pieces for organ, which already point to Reger in terms of mood, are particularly noteworthy. Individual chorale preludes find their way into more recent collections. Op. 82, 85, 88 and 109 were recorded for the Sender Freies Berlin, Other large concert pieces and chorale preludes have experienced new editions since 1997, which document their lasting value.

== Systematic catalogue of works (works with opus number) ==
Flügel himself published his lists of works, numbered consecutively according to instrumentation, irrespective of opus number, in 1869, 1874 and 1880 in the Euterpe

=== Instrumental music ===
==== Piano music ====
===== Piano pieces =====
- Op. 2 (Mond-) Walzer für das Pianoforte (1837, Magdeburg, Ernst Wagner & Richter,)
- Op. 6 Ungarischer Marsch und Ständchen für das Pianoforte (1845, Magdeburg, Heinrichshofen)
- Op. 9 Phalaenen für das Pianoforte, (1846, Bonn, N. Simrock) dedicated to Carl August Dohrn
- Op. 10 Nachtgespenst, Nachtsturm und Gebet für das Pianoforte (1847, Mainz, B.Schott's Söhne) dedicated to Gustav Adolf Keferstein; (Stettiner Exemplar online)
- Op. 11 Fantasie-Bilder für das Pianoforte, (1846, Mainz, B.Schott's Söhne) dedicated to Bischof Carl Ritschl
- Op. 14 Nachtfalter (Erstes Heft) für das Pianoforte, (1846, Leipzig, F. Whistling) dedicated to Elisabeth Brendel (née Tautmann)
- Op. 15 Caprice heroique für das Pianoforte, (1846) dedicated to Franz Liszt (?)
- Op. 16 Nachtfalter (Zweites Heft) für das Pianoforte, (1846, Leipzig, F. Whistling) dedicated to Clara Schumann (geb. Wieck)
- Op. 17 Tagfalter für das Pianoforte, (Leipzig, Fr. Hofmeister) dedicated to Friedrich Schmidt
- Op. 18 Mondschein-Bilder für das Pianoforte, (Leipzig, Fr. Hofmeister) dedicated to Ernst Ferdinand Wenzel, Lehrer am Conservatorium der Musik in Leipzig; (Stettiner Exemplar online) (Berliner Exemplar online)
- Op. 22 Zwei leichte Pianofortestücke, dedicated to his student Emil Silberschmidt (1849, Berlin, Bote&Bock); (Stettiner Exemplar online)
- Op. 24 Neue Nachtfalter für das Pianoforte (1849, Leipzig, Fr. Hofmeister) (Stettiner Exemplar online)
- Op. 25 IV Fantasie Tonstücke für das Pianoforte, (Berlin, Schlesinger) dedicated to Heinrich Marschner; (Stettiner Exemplare Op. 25, 2–4 online)
- Op. 27 Blumenlese für das Pianoforte, (1849, Leipzig, F. Whistling) dedicated to Auguste Warh; (Stettiner Exemplar online)
- Op. 29 Feldblumen für das Pianoforte, (1849, Berlin, Trautwein) dedicated to Wilhelm Taubert (Berliner Exemplar online)
- Op. 31 Capriccio (e-moll) für das Pianoforte (Leipzig, Breitkopf and Härtel), dedicated to Julius Knorr (Berliner Exemplar online)
- Op. 32 Kleine Tondichtungen für das Pianoforte (1850, Cassel, C. Luckhardt) "der Jugend gewidmet"; (Stettiner Exemplar online)
- Op. 34 Vier Clavierstücke, (1853, Coblenz, C.J. Falckenberg), dedicated to Frau E. Grunow
- Op. 38 Drei Klavierstücke (1856, Leipzig, Merseburger), dedicated to his friend Alfred Dörffel
- Op. 40 Volkspoesien. Zwei Fantasien für das Pianoforte, (Leipzig, Siegel), dedicated to Friedrich Kühmstedt
- Op. 41 Melancolie. Nachtstück für das Pianoforte, (Leipzig, Siegel), dedicated to C. Siegel
- Op. 44 Humoreske für das Pianoforte (1856, Mainz, Schott)
- Op. 62 Neun Pianofortestücke (1869, Neu-Ruppin, A. Oehmigke)
- Op. 63 Marienbildchen. Zwölf kleine instructive Clavierstücke, dedicated to Elisabeth zu Wied (1869/70, Neu-Ruppin, A. Oehmigke)
- Op. 64 Turnerscenen. Sechs Pianofortestücke (1869/70, Neu-Ruppin, A. Oehmigke)

===== Piano variations =====
- Op. 5 Variationen über drei deutsche Volkslieder für das Pianoforte (1845, Magdeburg, Heinrichshofen)
- Op. 12 Variationen über deutsche Volkslieder für das Pianoforte (1846, Bonn, N. Simrock) (Stettiner Exemplar online)
- Op. 37 Leichte, instructive Klavier-Variationen, (1856, Leipzig, Merseburger)
- Op. 42 Volksklänge. Ein variirtes Thema für das Pianoforte, (Leipzig, Siegel) dedicated to Amalia Prinz

===== Piano sonatas =====
- Op. 4 Grosse Sonate No. 1 (B major) for the pianoforte (comp. 1839/40), (1845, Leipzig, Breitkopf & Härtel), dedicated to Friedrich Schneider (Berlin copy online)
- Op. 7 Sonata No. 2 (B minor) for pianoforte (1845, Stettin, self-published; 1854 Magdeburg, Heinrichshofen) (played to Mendelssohn in Leipzig on 21 July 1846)
- Op. 13 Sonata No. 3 (B flat major) for pianoforte, (1846, Stettin, self-published; Hamburg, Schuberth & Co.) dedicated to Felix Mendelssohn Bartholdy (Stettiner Exemplar online)
- Op. 20 Sonata No. 4 (C minor) for pianoforte, (1848, Leipzig, Hofmeister) dedicated to Louis Spohr (Berlin copy online)
- Op. 36 Sonata No. 5 (C major) for pianoforte, (1854, Leipzig, Breitkopf & Härtel) (Berlin copy online)
- Op. 53 Sonata No. 6 (C major) for pianoforte, (1857, Erfurt and Leipzig, G. W. Körner) dedicated to Louis Köhler
- Op. 54 Klein Roland. Sonatine, No. 7 der Sonaten für das Pianoforte, (1859, Leipzig, Merseburger) dedicated to "der musikalischen Jugend"

==== Organ music ====
===== Choral Preludes and Organ Lessons =====
- Op. 33 13 Choralvorspiele für die Orgel (1853/54, Erfurt and Leipzig, G.W. Körner)
- Op. 39 Sechs Orgelstücke (1854, Rotterdam, W.C. de Vletter./ Leipzig, C.F. Leede)
- Op. 51 10 Orgelstücke (1857, Offenbach, André) dedicated to Paul Selbach
- Op. 57 VI Vorspiele für Orgel, (1871, Brieg, Richard Bräuer) dedicated to Consistorialrath D Carus (Stettiner Exemplar online)
- Op. 59 Vierundzwanzig kurze Choral-Vorspiele für Orgel (1862, Leipzig, C. Merseburger), dedicated to Albert Sigismund Jaspis, königlicher General-Superintendent der Provinz Pommern; (new edition 2008)
- Op. 60 14 Choral-Vorspiele für Orgel (1868, Leipzig, A. Dörffel)
- Op. 71 Kleine Orgelstücke, (1872, Berlin, Th. Chr. Fr. Enslin) dedicated to Ludwig Erk
- Op. 72 Präludienbuch (1872, Berlin, Th. Chr. Fr. Enslin) dedicated to Ernst Hentschel in Weissenfels zu seinem 50-jährigen Amtsjubiläum
- Op. 75 Zwölf Nachspiele zu Passion und Ostern für die Orgel (1874, Magdeburg, Heinrichshofen)
- Op. 78 Anfangs-Studien für das obligate Pedalspiel in dreistimmigen kleinen Orgelstücken, die zugleich als Vor- und Nachspiele dienen können (1878/79, Leipzig, Merseburger)
- Op. 89 Vor- und Nachspiele für die Orgel (1883, Leipzig, C.F. Kahnt)
- Op. 93 48 kleine Orgelstücke, (Vor-u.Nachspiele) in allen Dur- u. Molltonarten. Zum Gebrauch beim öffentlichen Gottesdienste, wie zur Anregung eines ausdrucksvollen Orgelspiels, (1885, Leipzig, J. Rieter-Biedermann) dedicated to Albert Sigismund Jaspis, Royal General-Superintendent of the province of Pomerania on his fiftieth anniversary in office (Stettiner Exemplar Part 1 online) (Stettiner Exemplar Teil 2 online)
- Op. 100 50 Choralbearbeitungen für Orgel (1893, Bremen/Leipzig, Carl Klinner) Jakob Heinrich Lützel, Professor and Director of Music in Zweibrücken, dedicated with friendship
- Op. 108 52 kurze Choralvorspiele mit beigegebener Analyse nebst Finger- und Fusssatz für die Orgel (1894, Langensalza, Hermann Beyer & Söhne) Herrn Fritz Lubrich, Kantor in Gnadenfrei Reg. Bez. Breslau, Chefredakteur der Leipziger Kirchenmusikzeitung Die Orgel gewidmet. (Stettiner Exemplar online)
- Op. 111 50 kurze Choralvorspiele und 50 Einleitungen für die Orgel. Zu den Andachten in höheren Lehranstalten wie zum gottesdienstlichen Gebrauch (1894, Zittau, Loebel) Seinem lieben Freunde Herrn Friedrich Gartz gewidmet
- Op. 114 20 leichte Vor- und Nachspiele für Orgel, zum gottesdienstlichen Gebrauche und zum Studium in Seminarien und Präparandenanstalten. (1895, Neuwied /Leipzig, Louis Heuser)
- Op. 115 50 figurierte Choräle für Orgeln mit einem Manual u. Pedal, zum gottesdienstlichen Gebrauch, wie zum Studium. (1895, Langensalza Hermann Beyer & Söhne) (Stettiner Exemplar online)
- Op. 121 31 rhythmische Choralvorspiele für Orgel, (1899, Leipzig, Leuckart) Robert Frenzel, organist at St. Wolfgang in Schneeberg i. S. freundschaftlich zugeeignet

===== The great concert pieces for organ =====
- Op. 74 II Orgelstücke (vmtl. 1874, Leipzig, Kühn), dedicated to Alexander Wilhelm Gottschalg
- Op. 77 II Orgelstücke (Wie schön,...) (1879, Berlin, Schlesinger), dedicated to August Haupt; (new edition 2000)
- Op. 82 Sollt ich meinem Gott nicht singen Fantasie (1881, Magdeb., Heinrichshofen), dedicated to August Gottfried Ritter
- Op. 83 Sonate (E-Dur) (1881, Magdeburg, Heinrhfn.), dedicated to his son Ernst Flügel
- Op. 85 Frühlings-Phantasie (1882, Leipzig, Leuckart), dedicated to Wilhelm Freudenberg; (Stettiner Exemplar online) (new edition 2007)
- Op. 88 Sollt ich meinem Gott nicht singen canonische Choralbearbeitung (1882, Leipzig, Kahnt), dedicated to Karl Piutti; (new edition 1996)
- Op. 96 Fest-Postludium mit Einleitung (1886, Leipzig, C.F.W. Siegel)
- Op. 97 Phantasie (Fis-Moll) (1888, Strassburg, C.F. Schmidt)
- Op. 99 III Fugen (1890, Leipzig, Rieter-Biedermann), dedicated to Kreuzorganist Emil Höpner
- Op. 101 III Fugen in Cdur (1891, Leipzig, Leuckart), dedicated to Elisabeth Krahnstöver
- Op. 102 II Orgelstücke (Du dessen Augen flossen...) (1891, Leipzig, Leuckart), dedicated to Carl Adolf Lorenz (Stettiner Exemplar Teil 1 (Praeludium) online) (Stettiner Exemplar Teil 2 (Fuge) online)
- Op. 103 II Orgelstücke (Tocc. u. And.) (1891, Leipzig, Rieter-B.), dedicated to Carl Rundnagel
- Op. 104 Toccata und Fuge (1892, Leipzig, Rieter-B.), Generalsup. dedicated to Heinrich Poetter
- Op. 105 Toccata und Fuge (1892, Leipzig, Leuckart), dedicated to Otto Türke
- Op. 106 Fuge in F (1893, Leipzig, Rieter-B.), dedicated to Gustav Hecht
- Op. 107 Toccata in F (1893, Langensalza, Beyer), dedicated to Paul Taggatz
- Op. 109 Allein Gott in der Höh'... (1894, Zittau/Zürich, Loebel), dedicated to Otto Zimmer; (new edition 1999)
- Op. 110 Elegie und Fuge (1894, Leipzig, Rieter-B.), dedicated to Theophil Forchhammer
- Op. 112 Toccata appassionata (1894 Zittau/Zürich, Loebel), dedicated to Otto Paulstich (komponiert schon im Sept. 1847!); (new edition 2012)
- Op. 113 Durch Nacht zum Licht (1895 Zittau/Zürich, Loebel), dedicated to Marie Margarete Paulstich; (Stettiner Exemplar online) (new edition 1999)

==== Chamber music ====
===== String quartet =====
- Op. 23 Quartet No. 1 (A minor). 1849. (Leipzig, Fr. Hofmeister) dedicated to Carl Koßmaly; (Noten online bei der University of Rochester)

===== Chamber music with organ =====
- Op. 86 Adagio für Orgel, Hornquartett und Harfe (1882, Leipzig, Leuckart) dedicated to Karl Emanuel Klitzsch
- Op. 90 Drei lyrische Tonstücke für Violine und Orgel (1882, Leipzig, Rieter) Paul Wild; (new edition 2004)
- Op. 119 Elegie für Violine und Orgel (1900, Langensalza, H. Beyer & Söhne) dedicated to E. Forchhammer
- Op. 120 Zwei Choralmelodien für Violoncello und Orgel (1900, Langensalza, Beyer) (Warschauer Exemplar von Nr. 1 online)

==== Orchestral music ====
- Op. 26 Concert-Ouverture No.1 Cmoll für Orchester, 1849. (Berlin, Trautwein) dedicated to the Princess von Prussia; (Stettiner Exemplar (Klavierauszug) online)

=== Vocal music ===
==== Songs for one singing voice ====
- Op. 1 Acht Lieder für eine Singstimme mit Pianoforte (1836, Magdeburg, Ernst Wagner & Richter), dedicated to Agnes u. Charlotte Loose.
- Op. 3 Acht Lieder für eine Singstimme mit Pianoforte („Zur Erinnerung an die Aufführung des Freischütz Stettin, 6. Februar 1842“), (1842, Stettin, Bulang), dedicated to Madame Wilsnach; (Stettiner Exemplar online)
- Op. 8 Zehn Jugend-Lieder für eine Singstimme mit Pianoforte (1845, Magdeburg, Heinrichshofen)
- Op. 19 Sechs Gesänge für eine Singstimme mit Pianoforte (1846, Leipzig, Breitkopf & Härtel) dedicated to Betty Lobedan and Franziska Schallehn (née. Schlüter)
- Op. 21 12 Lieder und Gesänge für eine Singstimme mit Pianoforte, (1848, Leipzig, Breitkopf & Härtel) dedicated to Karl Schmidt and Wilhelm Ritschl
- Op. 28 Drei Gesänge für eine Altstimme mit Pianoforte (1849, Leipzig, Peters)
- Op. 43 Geistliche Lieder aus dem span. Liederbuch f. eine Singst. mit Pianof. (1855, Leipzig, Merseburger)
- Op. 45 Sechs Lieder für eine Singstimme mit Pianoforte (1855, Kassel, Carl Luckhardt)
- Op. 52 Geistliche Lieder für Mezzosopran mit Pianoforte-Begleitung (1857, Aachen, Ernst ter Meer) dedicated to Kammersänger Ernst Koch in Cöln; (Stettiner Exemplar online)
- Op. 69 Sechs patriotische Lieder a) für eine Singstimme mit Pianoforte (1871, Leipzig, Carl Merseburger)
- Op. 73 Zwei geistliche Lieder für eine Singstimme mit Orgel (1875, Leipzig, Carl Merseburger) dedicated to F.A.L. Jakob
- Op. 92 Ein Lutherwort für eine Singstimme mit Pianoforte (1883, Leipzig, Carl Merseburger), dedicated to Herr Freiherrn Baron Senfft von Pilsach
- W.o.Op. Der kecke Finlay. (Rob. Burns) Lied für eine Singstimme mit Pianoforte (Liederkranz No. 33) (1850) (Stettiner Exemplar online)
- W.o.Op. „Niemand“ (Rob. Burns) Lied für eine Singstimme mit Pianoforte (Liederkranz No. 34) (1850) (Stettiner Exemplar online)

==== For women's and children's choir ====
- Op. 48 Pater Noster für drei gleiche Stimmen, (1857, Mainz, B. Schott's Söhne) dedicated to Dietrich Wilhelm Landfermann
- Op. 49 Sanctus o Salutaris für drei gleiche Stimmen (1857, Mainz, B. Schott's Söhne) dedicated to Dr. Lucas, Lehrer in Koblenz
- Op. 50 Cantaten, Responsorien und Vota Apostolica f. d. geistl. Kinderchor, (1857, Leipzig, C. Merseburger) dedicated to Ferdinand Stiehl, Geheimem Ober-Regierungs- und vortragendem Rath in dem Königlich Preußischen Ministerium / der geistlichen Unterrichts- und Medizinal-Angelegenheiten
- Op. 61 Frühlingslieder a) for 2 sopranos (2 sopranos and alto), b) for 2 sopranos (2 sopranos and alto) with pianoforte (1869, Neu-Ruppin, Alfred Oehmigke)
- Op. 66 Zwölf dreistimmige Chorlieder (1870, Leipzig, Brandstetter)
- Op. 69 Sechs patriotische Lieder c) for 2 sopranos and alto (1871, Leipzig, C. Merseburger)
- Op. 84 Drei kleine dreistimmige Motetten (1881, Magdeburg, Heinrichshofen)
- Op. 91 Gott und Natur. Dreistimmige polyphone Lieder (1884, Leipzig. C. Merseburger)

==== For male choir ====
- Op. 30 Drei Weihnachts-Cantaten für Männerchor, (1853, Koblenz, Falckenberg) dedicated to Ernst Hentschel
- Op. 35 Preuszische Königs-, Helden-, Kriegs- u. Siegeslieder, (1854, Neuwied, J.H. Heuser), dedicated to the Prince vn Prussia
- Op. 46 Bibelsprüche für Männerchor, (1856, Erfurt and Leipzig, Körner); (Stettiner Exemplar online)
- Op. 47 Bibel-Hymnen für den geistlichen Männerchor, (1856, Erfurt and Leipzig, Körner) dedicated to Friedrich Theodor Trinkler; (Stettiner Exemplar online)
- Op. 55 Festcantate für Männerchor mit Orgel oder Clavierbegleitung, (1857, Neuwied, F.J. Steiner) dedicated to "den Lehrern des Festsängerchores der vereinigten Synoden Simmern, Kreuznach, Trier etc."
- Op. 58 3 Cantaten für Männerchor, (1859, Leipzig, C.F. Kahnt) dedicated to the "kölnischen Männergesangverein"
- Op. 67 Sechs Lieder für Männerchor, (1870, Berlin, Adolph Stubenrauch)
- Op. 69 Sechs patriotische Lieder b) für Männerchor
- Op. 79 Zwölf Psalmensprüche für den geistl.Männerchor, (1878, Magdeburg, Heinrichshofen)
- Op. 87 Grosses hat der Herr gethan. Cantata for Männerchor and Soloquartett, (1882, Leipzig. F.E.C. Leuckart) dedicated to Friedrich Eduard Fetz

==== For mixed choir ====
- Op. 65 Six easy choral Lieder for mixed choir (1870, Breslau, Hientzsch)
- Op. 68 Four Lieder for mixed choir (1870, Berlin, Ad. Stubenrauch)
- Op. 70 Short cantatas on the Christian festivals on biblical texts for mixed voices, (1871, Berlin, Ad. Stubenrauch)
- Op. 80 Three sacred quartets, (1879, Magdeburg, Heinrichshofen) dedicated to the Crown Princess of Prussia
- Op. 81 Three quartets, (1881, Magdeburg, Heinrichshofen) dedicated to Wilhelm Sachse
- Op. 94 Seven Sacred Lieder for mixed choir (1886/87 Leipzig, Licht & Meyer) (Szczecin copy online)
- Op. 95 Short motets and responsories for soprano, alto and baritone, (1885, Leipzig, Rieter-Biedermann) dedicated to G. Carus
- Op. 98 Three church choral Lieder for soprano, alto, tenor and bass, (1889 (?), Kaiserslautern, Tascher) dedicated to "the Protestant Church Singing Society for the Palatinate".
- Op. 117 Psalm 126. motet for mixed choir, (comp. 1896) (Neuwied and Leipzig, Heuser) dedicated to the Thomaskantor Gustav Schreck, first performance Thomaskirche Leipzig 21 Nov. 1896.
- W.o.Op. The 46th Psalm God is our Confidence (Jubelfestgesang for the Celebration of the Reformation Festival) (1884) (Stettiner Exemplar online)

=== Works with opus numbers not yet known by name ===
- Op. 56 (presumably as part of a collection)
- Op. 76 (presumably as part of a collection)
- Op. 116 (A Psalm, possibly for mixed choir, comp. 1896)
- Op. 118 (A Psalm, possibly for mixed choir, comp. 1896)

=== Arrangement of works by other composers ===
- W.A. Mozart, Sinfonie Nr. 38 D-Dur (Prager 1786), KV 504, Arrangement for pianoforte 4 hands (around 1845? Magdeburg, Heinrichshofen; Berlin, Trautwein)

=== Lost work ===
The following manuscripts by Flügel remained unprinted and have not yet been found. They must be considered lost.

Orchestral music

- Festive March for the Duke's Entry (Dessau, 1830)

Chamber music

- First String Quartet (G minor) (Magdeburg, 1836)
- Several string quartets (Köthen, 1837/1838)
- Movement for clarinet and piano (?) (Stettin, 1848)
- Trio (D minor) for pianoforte, violin and violoncello (Stettin, 1849/50; premiere in Berlin 27 February 1850)
- Prelude for organ, violins, trumpets and trombones on Thou Whose Eyes Were Flowing (Stettin, c. 1878)

Piano music

- Variations for pianoforte (Bernburg, 1831/32)
- Variat. av. Introd. et Finale p. l. Pft. sur la Tyrolienne of the Opera William Tell by Rossini. (Köthen, 1834/35)
- Sonata (B flat major) for pianoforte four hands (Köthen, 1837)
- several sonatas for piano two hands (Köthen, 1837)
- other piano compositions" (Köthen, 1837/38)

Choral music

- Der Gang nach dem Eisenhammer for (male) choir and soli with pianoforte accompaniment (Dessau, 1828/29, first performed Nienburg/S., August 1829)
- Cantata on Psalm 145, 10–13 for mixed choir and orchestra (Magdeburg, 1836; première Bernburg, Harvest Festival 1836)
- Spring Cantata for mixed choir with instrument. Acc. (Szczecin, 1849, premiere Szczecin, 26 April 1849)
- 2 Choral Songs for mixed choir (SATB) without accompaniment (text by Oser) (Neuwied, 1856)
  - "Groß sind die Wogen"
  - "Who trusts in the Lord God"
- 2 Songs for mixed choir (SATB) without accompaniment (text by Oser) (Stettin, 1864)
  - Glory to our God alone
1. "Fluthen des Jammers heran rauschen" (Floods of misery rush in)
- Works for male choir (TTBB) (Stettin, before 1869) (manuscript with Bädeker, but as far as can be seen unpublished)
  - At Christmas: "Glory to God in the highest".
  - Easter: (1.Cor.15, 55.57.) "Death is swallowed up in victory"
  - Ascension: "Christ went up to heaven".
  - Pentecost: "Come Holy Spirit".
  - Solomon's prayer: "Thus wilt thou thy servant" (1.Kings 3,9.)
- Canticle for male choir (TTBB) (Stettin, 1872)
- Es blühen die Reben" for male choir (TTBB) a cappella
- Song of the old boys. "Und doch ist's wahr und bleibet wahr" (probably for male choir) (before 24 October 1884)
- Hochgelobt sei Gott for male choir (Stettin c. 1886, premiere Altdorf 14 April 1886)

Lieder for one voice

- "Many Lieder" (Köthen, 1837/38)
- 7 songs by Fr. Oser for one voice with pianoforte accompaniment (Neuwied, 1856)
  - "Thou art the Lord after all!"
  - "Be still to the Lord and wait for him." (also performable for SATB)
  - "Soul, why dost thou afflict?" (Oser) (also for SATB)
  - "Now Lord, how shall I be comforted?" (also for SATB)
  - "Only he is glad who was sad." (also for SATB)
  - "Thy word, O Lord, in thy mouth." (also for SATB)
  - "O most beautiful star!" (also for SATB)
- 11 Lieder on the Death of a Child for mezzo-soprano with piano accompaniment (text Fr. Oser) (Neuwied, 1856)
  - (Schöner prangt die Liebe nie, the first Lied in this collection, was published in 1879)
  - Wie die Rose blüthest du (Like the rose in bloom)
  - Sei getrost! Es kann der Hirt
1. We long and are weighed down #
  - Und sang' ich all mein Leben lang (And I sing all my life)
  - Now sleep in the cool earth! (appeared as an arrangement for mixed choir)
  - Mother was your first word
  - Take the dearest, Lord!
  - With violets be thy grave lined!
  - And how far I may wander
  - Whatever new sorrow comes.
- Come Holy Spirit for alto solo with organ accompaniment (first performance Stettin, beginning of Feb. 1871)
- Psalm 121 I lift up my eyes to the mountains for soprano (première Stettin, 7 May 1882)
- Heilge Nact Lied. (first recorded performance: Hanau, 20 January 1896)
