= Reinhard Liess =

German art historian (born 1937)

Reinhard Liess (born 10 April 1937) is a German art historian.

== Life ==
Born in Bunzlau, Silesia, Liess received his doctorate in 1965 from LMU Munich with the thesis Der frühromanische Kirchenbau des 11. Jahrhunderts in der Normandie. Analysen und Monographien der Hauptbauten. He habilitated in 1970 with a thesis on Wahrheit und Wirklichkeit in der Kunst des P.P. Rubens at the Technical University of Braunschweig, which was published in 1977 under the title The Art of Rubens. Liess became a university lecturer in 1971, taught art history as an associate professor in Braunschweig and University of Regensburg from 1974, as a university professor in Braunschweig from 1978, and at the University of Osnabrück from 1990 to 2002. From March to June 2001, he took a German Academic Exchange Service (DAAD) at the National University of Cuyo in Mendoza (Argentina). Liess retired on 30 September 2002.

In research and teaching, Liess is concerned with art from the Middle Ages to modern times, especially architecture, painting and graphic art. He was particularly interested in the planning history of the Strasbourg Cathedral and the person of Erwin von Steinbach. Most recently, in 2004, he published the anthology Jan Vermeer van Delft, Pieter Bruegel the Elder, Rogier van der Weyden. Drei Studien zur niederländischen Kunst; In 2003 Im Spiegel der "Meninas". Velázquez über sich und Rubens.

== Publications (selection) ==
- Der frühromanische Kirchenbau des 11. Jahrhunderts in der Normandie: Analysen und Monographien der Hauptbauten. Wilhelm Fink Verlag. Munich 1967, DNB-IDN 482279591.
- Die Kunst des Rubens. Waisenhaus-Buchdruckerei und Verlag, Braunschweig 1977.
- Die kleinen Landschaften Pieter Bruegels d. A. im Lichte seines Gesamtwerks. In Kunsthistorisches Jahrbuch Graz. 15/16, 1979/1980, pp. 1–117; 17, 1981, pp. 55–150; 18, 1982, pp. 79–165.
- Braunschweig. (Deutsche Lande, Deutsche Kunst). 5th edition. Deutscher Kunstverlag, Munich 1980, ISBN 3-422-00120-4.
- Goethe vor dem Straßburger Münster: Zum Wissenschaftsbild der Kunst. E. A. Seemann Verlag, Leipzig 1985, ISBN 3-527-17548-2.
- Der Riss A1 der Strassburger Münsterfassade im Kontinuum der Entwürfe Magister Erwins. In Kunsthistorisches Jahrbuch Graz. 21, 1985, pp. 47–121.
- Der Riss B der Straßburger Münsterfassade: Eine baugeschichtliche Revision. In Orient und Okzident im Spiegel der Kunst. Festschrift Heinrich Gerhard Franz zum 70. Geburtstag. (Forschungen und Berichte des Institutes für Kunstgeschichte der Karl-Franzens-Universität Graz. Vol. 7). Akademische Druck- und Verlagsanstalt Graz, 1986, ISBN 3-201-01296-3, pp. 171–202.
- Die Entstehung des Straßburger Risses mit dem Glockengeschoß und seine Stellung im Gesamtbild der Münsterfassade. In Münchner Jahrbuch der bildenden Kunst NF 37, 1986, pp. 33–112.
- Zur historischen Morphologie der hohen Chorgiebelfassade von Marienkirche. In Niederdeutsche Beiträge zur Kunstgeschichte 27, 1988, pp. 9–62.
- with Andrea Köpke: Zur ehemaligen Erwin-Inschrift von 1277 an der Westfassade des Straßburger Münsters. In: Zeitschrift für die Geschichte des Oberrheins. 137 (NF 98), 1989, pp. 105–173.
- Der Heisterbacher Altar. Rasch Druckerei und Verlag, Bramsche 1998, ISBN 3-932147-56-1.
- Im Spiegel der 'Meninas'. Velazquez über sich und Rubens. V & R unipress, Göttingen 2004, ISBN 3-89971-101-7.
- Zum Logos der Kunst Rogier van der Weydens. Die "Beweinungen Christi" in den Königlichen Museen in Brüssel und in der Nationalgalerie in London (Ad Opus-Kunstgeschichtliche Werkanalysen), 2 volumes. Lit, Münster 2000, ISBN 3-8258-4158-8.
- Jan Vermeer von Delft, Pieter Bruegel d.Ä., Rogier van der Weyden. Drei Studien zur niederländischen Kunst. V & R unipress, Göttingen 2004.
