= Carl Ritschl =

German evangelist theologian, bishop and composer

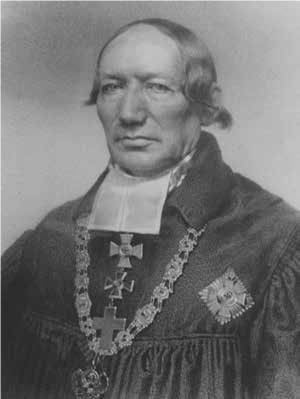

Georg Carl Benjamin Ritschl (1 November 1783 – 18 June 1858) was a German evangelist theologian, bishop and composer in Pomerania.

== Biography ==
Carl Ritschl was born to Georg Ritschl von Hartenbach and Regina Christina Emminghaus in Erfurt. His father was a priest and professor at the Erfurt Ratsgymnasium. He acquired instruction in voice, keyboard and organ with the organist Johann Christian Kittel, the last student of Johann Sebastian Bach. He graduated from the gymnasium at the age of fifteen

Ritschl continued studies in theology in Jena and, at the age of nineteen, earned his degree in autumn 1802. In 1804, still too young for a spiritual appointment, he began tutoring at their home the children of Johann Joachim Bellermann, the director of the Gymnasium of the Grey Friary. Ritschl was also a member of the music community in Berlin. At Berlin's Cöllnisches Gymnasium, associated with the Grey Friary, Ritschl instructed students in voice and religion. In 1804 he became a member of Carl Friedrich Zelter's choral society, for which he wrote several lieder. After he earned his Ph.D. from the University of Erfurt in 1805, he was appointed a collaborator (1807) and a subrector (1809) at the Cöllnischen Gymnasium

Finally, in 1810 he was appointed third preacher at Berlin's St. Mary's Church, but he also retained a number of his students from the Grey Friary and the Cöllnisches Gymnasium. After becoming a second preacher at St. Mary's, he acquired in 1816 additional responsibilities as an assessor, later as a councilor, from the newly established Consistory of the Province of Brandenburg.

On 25 September 1810, he married Juliane Meudtner, the daughter of a police commissioner (Polizeikommissar). They had five children before Meudtner died in 1820. On 18 June 1821, Ritschl married his second wife, Auguste Sebald, an accomplished singer, whose father was a court justice and a co-founder of the Sing-Akademie zu Berlin. Ritschl became a member of the Singakademie that same year. In 1822 the Theology faculty at the University of Berlin granted him an honorary doctorate.

In 1827 Ritschl was appointed General Superintendent in Stettin for the old-Prussian Ecclesiastical Province of Pomerania, earning the title of bishop. This office was bound with the activities of the President of the Pomeranian Consistory and the preachers at the Palace Church. For twenty-seven years, he held this office in a time when the Calvinist, Lutheran, and united Protestant doctrines were at loggerheads, due to the establishment of the Prussian Union of churches in 1817. During this debate, Ritschl stood on the side of the crown and sought a middle ground, but he still could not prevent a schism between the Lutherans and the Prussian Union. The "schismatics" established their own "old Lutheran" church in Prussia.

From September 1829 to May 1830, Ritschl took a leave of absence from his duties in the Province of Pomerania and, on a plea from the Russian government, travelled to St. Petersburg in order to help lay the groundwork for the Evangelical-Lutheran church in Russia.

While living in Stettin (after 1945 renamed Szczecin), Ritschl worked with the composer Carl Loewe to nurture the city's musical life. Weekly musical evenings (Gesangsabende) were held in Ritschl's rectory.

Ritschl retired on 1 October 1854. He lived his final years in Berlin, where he died on 18 June 1858 at the age of seventy-five.
