= Johannes Fleck =

German lutheran theologian

Johann(es) Fleck (Latinised: Flaccus, (1559 in Zwickau – 30 July 1628 in Küstrin) was a German Lutheran pastor, superintendent and court and cathedral preacher.

== Life ==
The son of the physician Matthäus Fleck, the first city physician (Stadtphysicus) of Berlin and his wife Regina Schirmer, he studied at the University of Leipzig, where he earned the academic degree of magister. In 1586, he was appointed as a deacon to Nikolaikirche (Zeitz). There, he married the widow Susanna Weinhorst on 27 February 1587. In 1589 he became pastor in Ramsdorf and 1592 superintendent in Colditz.

On 5 April 1596, he was appointed inspector (superintendent) at the Marienkirche in Prenzlau. The capital of the Uckermark offered the convinced Lutheran an ideal field of activity. "In 1597, Superintendent Johannes Fleck railed from the pulpit that in future the church should be kept closed because young and old adulterers held their secret conversations in it and full-blooded drunkards purified themselves in it" When the Franciscan Monastery Prenzlau, which had been repaired for the Protestant church by order of the electoral captain Bernd von Arnim in 1597, was consecrated on 24 February 1598, Fleck preached the first Lutheran sermon. "He gave the house of God the new name of the churches of the Holy Trinity, since it had now been taken from the (papal) Antichrists and given to God the Lord".

In 1601, Joachim Frederick, Elector of Brandenburg appointed him as court and cathedral preacher in Berlin. In this capacity, he preached the inaugural sermon (which has survived in print) at the newly founded Joachimsthalsches Gymnasium in 1607. Under John Sigismund, Elector of Brandenburg, Fleck was transferred to Küstrin as inspector (superintendent) in 1611. When this elector converted to the Calvinism, Fleck polemicised fiercely against it and prophesied the downfall of his sovereign and his chancellor Friedrich Pruckmann, "as it had been for the then Saxon elector and his chancellor around 1590 because of their Calvinism".

In his second marriage, Fleck was married to Ursula Heerwig. He died on 30 July 1628 in Küstrin.
