= Master of the Prenzlau high altar =

16th-century German artist

The Master of the Prenzlauer Hochaltars is the notational name of one or rather two artists working in Lübeck at the beginning of the 16th century, named after the high altar of the Marienkirche in Prenzlau, dated 1512.

== Prenzlau high altar in modern times ==
The carved altar, made in Lübeck, partially survived the Great Fire of Prenzlau in 1945 because it had been walled in a tower as a precautionary measure. It stands again in the then burnt down and after 1970 rebuilt Brick Gothic Marienkirche. However, the carved figures of the altar were stolen in 1991. Some of them were recovered in Lübeck shortly afterwards.

== The master or masters? ==
Art scholars suspect that the carver and the painter of the altar were different persons. In terms of image carving, the altar differs from works by the Lübeck artists Claus Berg or Benedikt Dreyer, who were otherwise close to it. The Laurentius Altar of the Brotherhood of Brewers' Servants of 1522 in the St. Anne's Museum Quarter, Lübeck is also attributed to this carver. The painting, on the other hand, falls short of quality; in connection with a classification, the Master of the Bützow Altarpiece, also unknown by name, is more frequently mentioned.
