= Friedrich Kühmstedt =

German composer

- Born: 20 December 1809; Oldisleben, Germany
- Died: 8 January 1858 (aged 48); Eisenach, Germany

Friedrich Karl Kühmstedt (20 December 1809 – 8 January 1858) was a German composer. He studied with Johann Nepomuk Hummel in Weimar. His work includes symphonies, fugues and preludes for organ.
