= Ernst Flügel =

German composer

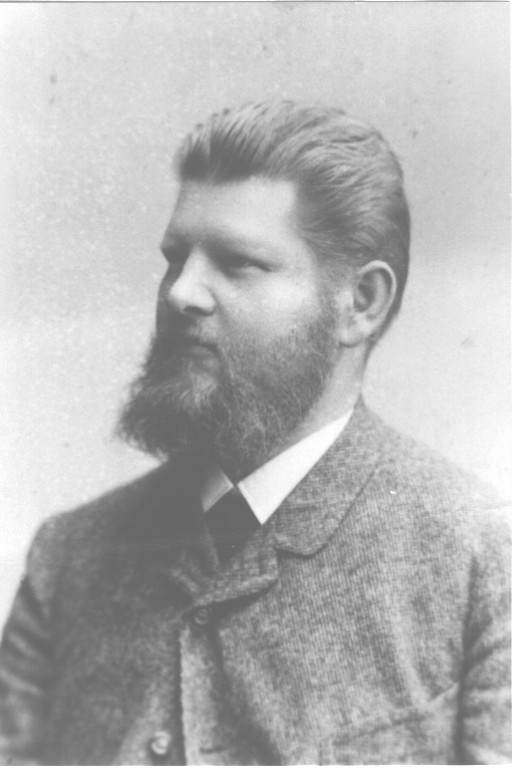
Ernst Flügel (1844–1912)

Ernst Paul Flügel (31 August 1844 — 20 October 1912) was a German Romantic composer.

== Life ==
Born in Halle, Ernst Paul Flügel, was a son of Gustav Flügel (1812–1900) and his second wife Henriette née Oppermann (1823–1896).

=== Education ===
Flügel received his first music education from his father, and later (from 1859) from the composer, conductor and music writer Carl Koßmaly in Stettin, who also taught him music theory and aesthetics.

Since April 1862, Flügel was a pupil of the Royal Institute for Church Music in Berlin and from October 1862 also an eleve of the Royal Academy of Arts, "where the Director A. W. Bach Professor Grell, Music Director Jul. Schneider and Löschhorn, the proven teacher of pianoforte playing, are his teachers". Here he also enjoyed the private lessons of Hans von Bülow, F. Geyer and Friedrich Kiel. On 7 March 1863, the budding pianist Flügel gave his first widely acclaimed concert in Stettin. In the public annual meeting of the Kgl. Academie der Künste zu Berlin on 3 August 1863, Flügel was also awarded a prize by the academic senate as a composition student. On the same day, a composition by the nineteen-year-old grand piano is performed there for the first time in a performance in honour of Frederick William III: Miserere mei Deus, a tercet with chorus.

=== Music teacher in Treptow and Greifswald (1863–1867) ===
Since the summer of 1863, Flügel lived as a music teacher in Altentreptow. Already on 1 November 1863, he gave his first concert there.

In early 1864, Alfred Dörffel in Leipzig published Flügel's Opus 1, Wanderungen (piano pieces). On 23 February 1864, the pianist gave a second, extremely well-attended and well-received concert in Stettin. In early March 1864, Flügel travelled to Leipzig, perhaps to find a publisher for further compositions. At the beginning of 1865, Flügel became a member of the Allgemeiner Deutscher Musikverein. On 21 September 1865, the seminary choir of Weißenfels performed a Salvum fac regem by Flügel at the Roßbach Monument in the presence of the King.

In July 1866, Flügel took part unscathed in the Austro-Prussian War at the campaign of the Main as vice sergeant. From the summer of 1866, Flügel worked for a short time as a music teacher in Greifswald. On 13 December 1866, he also gave a concert here and shone with his pianistic abilities. Also published in Greifswald in 1867 were the Liederhefte Op. 2–4.

=== Organist in Prenzlau (1867–1879) ===
At Easter 1867, Flügel became organist and Gymnasialgesanglehrer in Prenzlau. At the latest with the concert in February 1868, in which Flügel appeared as pianist, he established his musical top position there:

"More accomplished piano playing has probably not yet been heard within our walls. One does not know whether one should admire more the skill and strength, or the conception and memory of the artist."

In the concert on 15 March 1868, Flügel not only appeared as an admired pianist, but also drew attention to himself as director of the singing society he had taken over. On 22 October 1869, Flügel gave his first chamber music soirée.

On 2 March 1869, he had his daughter Elisabeth Emma Antonie Flügel baptised in St. Marien in Prenzlau where she died on 3 January 1870 and was buried two days later. On 7 January 1870, Hentschel wrote a letter of comfort to Gustav Flügel: "My dear friend! The sad news of the sudden passing of your dear granddaughter has taken me and mine by very painful surprise. Please be assured of our sincere sympathy; it is all the more heartfelt, the more numerous the proofs you have given us over a number of years that you share our joys and sorrows, as few do.

On 19 April 1868, Flügel married his bride Anne Schumacher from Treptow an Toll in Prenzlau St. Jakobi. Four children were born of this marriage. On 2 March 1869, a wedding was celebrated in

Flügel also took an active part in the Franco-Prussian War. On 21 August 1870, "Vice Sergeant Ernst Flügel, organist in Prenzlau, and wife" gave a church concert in Stralsund. Flügel's wife Anna, née Schumacher sang soprano arias. Pieces by Mendelssohn, Handel and Bach were heard. In the summer of 1871, Flügel was awarded the Iron Cross, but had to remain in military service.

Apparently, Flügel also used his military time to compose. For in his first subscription concert in Prenzlau in October 1871, there were not only piano compositions by Gustav Flügel (Sonata Op. 4), Chopin, and Liszt ("Faust"-Walzer) as well as vocal recitals by the cathedral singer Hrn Geyer from Berlin, but also piano pieces by Ernst Flügel with the title: Aus dem Felde 1871. From winter 1871 onwards, there is evidence of close collaboration with Heinrich de Ahna the 1st concertmaster of the Kgl. Kapelle in Berlin, with whom he performs among others piano violin sonatas by Beethoven and Rubinstein.

On 19 June 1872, the second daughter Margarethe Louise Flügel and on 6 October 1873 the third daughter Gertrud Anna Flügel were baptised in St. Marien Prenzlau.

The high standards of Flügel's musical taste can be seen in the pieces he performed. In January 1874, he performed among others the piano violin sonatas by Kiel (E minor) and Grieg (G major). Over the years, Flügel's subscription concerts included the Piano Quartet Op. 26 by Brahms, Piano-Violin Sonatas by Beethoven and Rubinstein, the Hungarian Dances by Brahms/Joachim, as well as piano trios by Schumann and Mendelssohn.

A highlight of Flügel's effectiveness in Prenzlau was the performance of Brahms' Requiem on 9 April 1875. The success was so great that the work was heard again on 28 September. In further concerts, the composer's own works were also performed, such as the Trio in E flat major, Op. 25, in November 1875. or his Concertouverture (which apparently remained unprinted) as early as 1877. But Brahms remained a favourite composer in Flügel's programmes. In November 1876, his Schicksalslied was heard, along with Schumann's Pilgrimage of the Rose, Shortly afterwards Mendelssohn's Walpurgisnacht, an eight-part Bach motet, then in February 1877 Beethoven's Violin Concerto. One reviewer opined in 1877:

"The last season again brought us a series of musical performances that one would rarely find in another provincial city of the same size."

But Flügel did not only excel as a musician. He was also an authority as a chess player. Thus he also took part in the Chess Congress in Leipzig in July 1877. The following entry appeared in the Musikalisches Conversations-Lexikon by Jul. Schuberth (1877): Flügel, Ernst, born about 1848 [sic!] has made himself well known through some compositions; lives in Prenzlau as an organist. He is also known as an excellent chess player.

=== Kantor at St. Bernhardin Breslau (1879–1908) ===
At the beginning of July 1879, Flügel was appointed to succeed M.D. Berthold as cantor at the main and parish church of St. Bernhardin in Breslau. Flügel held this office from 1 October 1879 until his retirement in 1908. In the same year, Flügel published Op. 18, his first chorale prelude, which are not inferior to those of his father. In addition, since 1879 he was active as a music consultant with a sharp pen, and since 1880 he was a contributor to the Schlesische Zeitung.

In April 1881, still under the direction of Scholz Flügel, the 121st Psalm was heard. (Op. 22).

In 1881, Flügel founded the "Flügelsche Gesangverein", named after him, which was to shape the musical life of the city for more than two decades. In February 1882, Flügel's probably best-known work Mahomets Gesang (Op. 29) (after a text by Goethe) was premiered in Breslau. On 11 September 1882, Flügel's association sang at the Breslau Music Festival. On 10 October, the Province of Silesia presented him with a precious Geneva clock with gold chain and engraving as a memento of his participation. On 14 November 1882, Flügel had his choral society perform Becker's B minor Mass. The performance was held on 20. The performance was repeated on 20 February 1882 as a charity concert "for the benefit of the poor". On 23 January 1883, Flügel's Gesangverein had already performed a concert of recent choral music and Beethoven's 9th Symphony.

In January 1883, Max Bruch was appointed to succeed Scholz as director of the Orchesterverein in Breslau. Ernst Flügel is also able to work together with Bruch in an excellent musical way from the beginning, as evidenced by a number of joint concerts. On 10 November, the oratorio Luther in Worms by Meinardus is performed by Ernst Flügel. On 5 February 1884, Flügel performed together with Bruch among others the Nänie by Brahms and Zigeunerleben by Schumann. Bruch liked to draw on the pianist Flügel for his concerts, collaborating with the Flügel'schen Gesangverein and performing works by Flügel, such as his Concertouverture Wanderlust on 4 March 1884. On 19 April 1884, Bruch recommended Flügel's compositions to his publisher Simrock for printing.

Flügel's years in Breslau were marked by a tremendous workload. On 11 March 1884, Flügel among others performs the Piano Trio, F minor, Op. 65 by Dvořák.

On 11 November of the same year, performance of Schumann's Faust Scenes by the Flügel'schen Gesangverein. This was followed on 30 November 1886 by the performance of Liszt's Legende von der heil. Elisabeth by the Flügel'schen Gesangverein. On 31 January 1888, "completed" Performance of G. Vierling's Alarich by the Flügel'schen Gesangverein. In December 1888, Flügel performed Brahms' Piano Trio in C minor.

In 1888, Flügel was appointed Royal Music Director. At the beginning of December 1888, he performed the Kyrie, Sanctus and Agnus Dei by Max Bruch for choir and soli with orchestra and again the Mass in B flat minor by A. Becker with the Flügel'schen Gesangverein. From 1888 onwards, Bruch, the director of the Orchesterverein, became increasingly dissatisfied with Flügel's reviews and considerable tension arose. As a result, Bruch initially enforced that Flügel be banned from reviewing. However, considerable resistance mobilised against this muzzle in Breslau in 1889, which led to financial difficulties for the Orchesterverein. Bruch left Breslau in 1891.

On 24 May 1891, Flügel was the guest of honour at the 200th anniversary secular celebration of the Sing-Akademie in Berlin. Besides his musical activities and his passion for chess, Flügel was also a friend of hiking, especially mountain hiking. On 26 June 1891, the royal music director Flügel gave a lecture to the Breslau Section of the German Alpine Club on "Tours in the Brenta, Presanella and Ortler Groups." On 10 January 1895, benefit concert with the participation of Ernst Flügel, who among others performed the A minor piano concerto by Schumann.

His mother died in Stettin on 25 April 1895. On 23 October 1895, Flügel performed Rubinstein's Paradise Lost At the inauguration of the Kaiser Wilhelm Monument in Breslau (1896), Flügel was awarded the Red Eagle Order 4th Class. At the concert celebrating the 100th birthday of Franz Schubert in 1897, Flügel played, among other pieces, the Piano Trio in E-flat major. In memory of Johannes Brahms, who died on 3 April 1897, the Flügel'sche Gesangverein performed his Deutsches Requiem among others in October 1897.

In December 1897, a serious disagreement arose between Ernst Flügel and his father. The aged 85-year-old Gustav Flügel had not wanted to grant Ernst's daughter accommodation in his small servant's flat in the house on Königsplatz on her honeymoon in Stettin, whereupon the Breslau cantor intervened. "It was a high point of his life when he was appointed by the Kaiser to judge at the first German singing competition in Kassel in 1899" On 15 August 1900, his father Gustav Flügel died in Stettin.

At the dedication ceremony of the renovated Bernhardin Church on 1 September 1901, Flügel was appointed professor. In 1902, Flügel had to dissolve his choral society, which at last consisted of only 150 members, for financial reasons.

=== Old age and death (1908-1912) ===
He retired on 1 April 1908. The composer died in Breslau on 20 October 1912 at the age of 68.

== The music critic ==
Flügel worked for 32 years from 1880 to 1912 as music editor of the Schlesische Zeitung in Breslau and wrote hundreds of widely acclaimed reviews. He drew his authority precisely from his indisputable ability as a practising and creative musician, and thus gave the lie to the prejudice that only failed musicians wrote reviews:

His critiques of the musical achievements in our city, which he worked through with the greatest care, often sharply honed, but always stimulating and worth reading, gave him from the beginning a position in musical life that is rarely granted to a music critic. He was not always a friend of the new, his ideal of beauty stemmed from the classical period of newer music, but even where he resisted the encroaching new spirit, he was always filled with a holy zeal for his art [...]. Throughout the ages he was a faithful guardian of his art, and Breslau's musical life could hardly be imagined without him.

— E. Bohn (?) obituary Schlesische Zeitung 22 October 1912

He wrote about Theodor Kirchner as early as 1879: "K. is an acknowledged master of the small form of the character piece for piano. In this field he towers above all his colleagues by a head.".

The Classical attitude becomes clear, for example, in Flügel's reviews of Reger's works, whose compositions he firmly rejected as early as 1903:

the song composers [...] and Max Reger [...] have in common that they basically avoid any structured and therefore easily understandable melody, but try to do justice to the mood of the text by harmonic means and by declamatory means. They are hardly songs, rather lyrical scenes, in which the endeavour to deviate from the usual at all costs is not exactly pleasantly touching. [...] The principle of 'new, unheard-of things at any price' seems to be most developed in Reger's Lieder. There is no trace of artistic necessity in this kind of setting, but it appears as a product of chance and whim, whereby the listener is expected to make a revaluation of all previous aural values. Anyone who has no desire to do this will reject Reger's poetry, and reject it thoroughly. [...] In particular, the presented numbers from op. 70 are true samples of unnature and ear-tormenting searchiness. Just one example. Reger treats the light love affair offered by the J.G. Fleischer text Mein und Dein with the dreadful seriousness and embarrassing awkwardness of a serious criminal case. This grotesque disproportion between word and sound would be laughable if the tormented ear did not object to it. If these songs by Max Reger, who is being held up as a trailblazer by a section of the specialist press, were to represent a sample of the future development of our lyrical-musical production, then only those who belong to the old generation and no longer need to listen to this kind of music for too long could be grateful.

In 1906, Flügel called Reger a "destroyer of tonal consciousness" who was addicted to modulation collapse, in the face of whose "eccentricities" the listener is overcome by "the feeling of harmonic seasickness".

== Importance and afterlife ==
Of Flügel's compositions, the 121st Psalm (Op. 22), Mahomet's Song (Op. 24) and the Piano Trio (Op. 25) are particularly highlighted. But also the chorale preludes find their way into newer collections again and again.

The enormous literary achievement of the music critic Flügel has yet to be rediscovered.

Flügel's handwritten estate, who also kept the compositions of his father Gustav, was lost in Vienna in 1945 due to bombing. However, the Pomeranian Library in Szczecin owns a number of his father's works, which are marked with his ownership note.

Individual organ pieces have been recorded for the Sender Freies Berlin and have appeared in anthologies. Recent recording: Jerusalem, du hochgebaute Stadt, Choral für Orgel Performer: Martin Rost, in Organ Landscape/ Orgellandschaft: Pomerania (Label: MD&G (Dabringhaus & Grimm), 29 June 2004)

== Catalogue raisonné ==
The pianist and cantor Flügel composed almost exclusively for the pianoforte (Op. 1, 7, 9, 12 and 13, 15–17, 20, 27, 31, 32, 37, 60 and 61), and for mixed choir, partly with orchestral accompaniment (Op. 21, 22, 24, 28.30, 34, 38, 39, 43, 50, 51, 54, 55, 58, 62, 63, 65 and 67), as well as a large number of Liederfor one voice (Op. 2–6, 10, 11, 23, 26, 35, 46, 47, 53, 56 and 64). Op. 57 is composed for women's choir alone. His organ works and chorale preludes (Op. 18, 19, 59 and 66) are only quantitatively behind this. His chamber music includes the Trio Op. 25 and the piano-cello pieces Op. 41 and 42 and the two duos for keyboard instruments Op. 14 and 40. His Concertouverture for orchestra is lost.

Flügel's first known composition is a Miserere mei Deus, a tercet with choir, which was performed in 1863. His Op. 1 was published while still in Treptow (in 1867) Op. 2–4 in Greifswald. With the beginning of his activity in Breslau, 20 works appeared within 4 years (Op. 5 to 26, Op. 6 and 7 appeared already in 1876.), almost exclusively piano works and Lieder. The 121st Psalm (Op. 22), composed in 1878, marked the beginning of his successful compositions for mixed choir, including his most famous work, Mahomet's Song. Flügel published his first chorale prelude (Op. 18) in 1879, followed by a decade of low compositional productivity, during which time only Op. 27 (1885) and Op. 28-30 (1890/91) were published. The year 1893 marks the beginning of another active creative period, clearly influenced by ecclesiastical themes. In this year alone, about ten works by Flügel (Op. 31–42) appeared. In the years from 1895 to 1904, Flügel published at least one work a year (Op. 37–63). The last works (Op. 64 and 65 (1907), Op. 66 (1909) and Op. 67 (1910) are already under the shadow of approaching death. It is hardly a coincidence that Flügel, like his father, set the 126th Psalm When the Lord shall redeem the captives of Zion to music as one of his last pieces (cf. Gustav Flügel Op. 117). His Schwanengesang Op. 67 is also a piece for mixed choir, to which he devoted all his heart and soul until the end.: "Stark ist des Todes rauhe Hand."

=== A) Works with opus number ===
- Op. 1 Wanderungen. Kleine Stücke für Pianoforte. (Leipzig, Alfred Dörffel, 1864)

No. 1 Auf dem Wasser.
No. 2 In der Fremde.
No. 3 Erholung.
No. 4 Zu Zweien.
No. 5 Tanz.
No. 6 Traumbild.
No. 7 Das alte Lied.

- Op. 2 Sechs Lieder für eine Singstimme mit Begleitung des Pianoforte (Greifswald, Verlag der Academischen Buchhandlung, 1867; Leipzig. Leuckart 1876) (First performance Szczecin, 8 March 1863)

No. 1. Im wunderschönen Monat Mai. (text Heinrich Heine).
No. 2. In der Ferne: "Jetzt wird sie wohl im Garten gehen". (text Robert Eduard Prutz)
No. 3. Abends: "In dieser Stunde denkt sie mein". (text Rob. Ed. Prutz)
No. 4. Himmelslicht: Silberumsäumtes Wolkengebilde. (text Friedrich Oser)
No. 5. Es treibt dich fort. (text H. Heine)
No. 6. Wanderers Nachtlied: Über allen Wipfeln ist Ruh. (text Joh. Wolfg. v. Goethe)

- Op. 3 Sechs Lieder für eine Singstimme mit Begleitung des Pianoforte (Greifswald, Verlag der Academischen Buchhandlung, 1867; Leipzig. Leuckart 1876)

No. 1 Die Nacht zum ersten Mai: Was reitet und fährt um Mitternacht
No. 2 Nachtlied: Der Mond kommt still gegangen (text Emanuel Geibel)
No. 3 Wie freundlich die Sonne herniederblickt
No. 4 Die blauen Frühlingsaugen (text H. Heine)
No. 5 Schöne Sennin, noch einmal (text Nikolaus Lenau)
No. 6 Wie die wilde Ros' im Wald (text Franz Mair)

- Op. 4 Sechs Lieder für eine Singstimme mit Begleitung des Pianoforte (Greifswald, Verlag der Academischen Buchhandlung, 1867; Leipzig. Leuckart 1876)

No. 1 Vorsatz: Ich will's dir nimmer sagen. (text Rob. Ed. Prutz)
No. 2 Mein Lieb ist gleich der rothen Ros (text Robert Burns)
No. 3 Du bist wie eine Blume (text H. Heine)
No. 4 Dunkel ist die Nacht (text J.W. v. Goethe)
No. 5 Schilflied: Drüben geht die Sonne scheiden (text N. Lenau)
No. 6 O wär’ mein Lieb’ die Fliederblüth(text R. Burns)

- Op. 5 Sieben Lieder für eine Singstimme mit Begleitung des Pianoforte (Berlin, Bote & Bock, 1879)

No. 1 Willst du mit mir zieh’n?
No. 2 Wie's Röslein am Haage
No. 3 Ihr wisst ja, wen ich meine.
No. 4 O Liebe, wie bist du an Wundern reich.
No. 5 O Liebe, schönste Blume.
No. 6 Liebster, o Liebster! komm, sage mir's doch.
No. 7 So leicht ist Liebe.

- Op. 6 Sechs Lieder für eine Singstimme mit Pianoforte-Begleitung (Leipzig, Fritzsch, 1876; Leipzig, Eulenburg, 1879)

No. 1 Da war Musik. ()
No. 2 Im Herbst: Vorbei der Rosen Prangen. (text Albert Träger)
No. 3 Blick in den Strom: Sahst du ein Glück vorüberziehn. (text N. Lenau)
No. 4 Abendfriede: Sanft am Berge zittert. (text Jul. Altmann)
No. 5 Meine Mutter hat's gewollt. (text Theod. Storm)
No. 6 Hochland-Marie: Ihr Hügel um Montgomry's Schloss (text R. Burns)
No. 7 Mondscheinbilder. 4 Klavierstücke. (Leipzig, Fritzsch, 1876)

- Op. 8 Wanderungen. Neue Folge. 7 Klavierstücke (Berlin, Bote & Bock, 1879)
- Op. 9 Drei Charakterstücke (Berlin, Bote & Bock, 1879)
- Op. 10 Fünf Lieder by [Wilhelm] Osterwald für eine Singstimme mit Begleitung des Pianoforte (Leipzig, Eulenburg, 1879)

No. 1 Schöner Mai, bist über Nacht
No. 2 Dort unterm Lindenbaume
No. 3 Treibt der Sommer seinen Rosen
No. 4 Die Sterne flimmern und prangen
No. 5 Flieget, leichte Maienlüftchen

- Op. 11 Vier Lieder aus den Bauernnovellen von Björnstjerne Björnson für eine Singstimme mit Begleitung des Pianoforte (Leipzig, Leuckart, 1879)

No. 1 Hältst du zu mir
No. 2 Es war so ein heller Sonnenschein
No. 3 Der Knab’ ging zum Walde
No. 4 Wundern soll's mich

- Op. 12 Miniaturbilder. Kleine, instruktive Klavierstücke (Leipzig, Rothe, 1880)
- Op. 13 Vier Impromptus für Pianoforte (Leipzig, Breitkopf & Härtel, 1879)
- Op. 14 Vier Original-Duos für Harmonium und Pianoforte (Berlin, Simon, 1879)
- Op. 15 Fünf Charakterstücke für Pianoforte (Leipzig, Leuckart, 1879)
- Op. 16 Bunte Reihe. Kleine Klavierstücke (Leipzig, Hofmeister, 1879)
- Op. 17 Bunte Reihe. II. Heft Kleine Klavierstücke (Leipzig, Hofmeister, 1881)
- Op. 18 Zehn Choralvorspiele für die Orgel (Leipzig, Kahnt, 1879)
- Op. 19 Sechs Orgelstücke für 2 Manuale und Pedal (Leipzig, Kahnt, 1879)
- Op. 20 Thema mit [6] Variationen für das Pianoforte zu vier Händen componirt (Berlin, Bote & Bock, 1879)
- Op. 21 Zur Entlassung der Abiturienten für gemischten Chor a cappella
- Op. 22 Psalm 121 "Ich hebe meine Augen auf" für gemischten Chor, Soli und Orchester (Breslau, Hainauer, 1881) (Ur-Aufführung: Prenzlau, 15 May 1878)
- Op. 23 Vier Lieder für eine Singstimme mit Klavierbegleitung (Breslau, Hientzsch, 1881)

No. 1 Träume: Lieblich blüh’n die Bäume
No. 2 Im Sommer: Da der Sommer kommen ist (text Wilhelm Osterwald)
No. 3 Komm, liebe Nacht
No. 4 Ich denke nicht

- Op. 24 Mahomets Gesang. [Goethe] Concert Piece for mixed choir and orchestra (Breslau, Hainauer, 1882) (premiere: Breslau, February 1882)
- Op. 25 Trio, E flat major for violin, violoncello and pianoforte (Breslau, Hientzsch, 1882) (first performance: Prenzlau, November 1875)
- Op. 26 Drei Lieder von Franz Kern für eine Singstimme mit Pianoforte (Breslau, Hainauer, 1882, vom Verlag fälschlich unter dem Namen "Gustav Flügel" beworben)

No. 1. Still und tief zu träumen
No. 2. Mich umweht's wie Frühlingshauchen
No. 3. Die Zeit der trüben Trauer

- Op. 27 Zwei Etuden für Pianoforte (Breslau, Hainauer, 1885)
- Op. 28 To a friend for mixed choir and orchestra. Rüstig wandelst du fort (text Lenau) (Breslau, Selbstverlag, 1888; Breslau, Offhaus, 1890) (Warschauer Exemplar online)
- Op. 29 Geistliche Lieder. Issue I for mixed choir (Leipzig, Klinner, 1891/92)

No. 1 Wenn Trauer mir das Herz beschwert. (text Sachse)
No. 2 Es ist so still geworden (text Kinkel)

- Op. 30 Geistliche Lieder. Issue II. for mixed choir (Leipzig, Klinner, 1892)

No. 1 Jesu benigne (for mixed choir)
No. 2 Meine Seele harret Motet for two 4 part choirs (SATB) a cappella

- Op. 31 Vier Klavierstücke (Breslau, Hainauer, 1892)

No. 1. Nocturne (B).
No. 2. Romanze (Es).
No. 3. Impromptu (As).
No. 4. Toccata (F). (Numerized)

- Op. 32 Drei Klavierstücke (Breslau, Hainauer, 1892/93)

No. 1. Elegie. Mk 1.
No. 2. Intermezzo. Mk 1.
No. 3. Ballade.

- Op. 33 Walz (A minor) for pianoforte (Breslau, Becher, 1893)
- Op. 34 Old Christmas Carol for mixed choir (Leipzig, Klinner, 1893)

Es kommt ein Schiff beladen

- Op. 35 Five Lieder for one singing voice with piano accompaniment (Breslau, Hainauer, 1893)

No. 1. Bescheiden: Grüss dich Himmel ruft mir süss.
No. 2. Altdeutsches Minnelied: Es ist in den Wald gesungen. (text Tieck nach Heinrich, der Schreiber)
No. 3. Du bist so still, so sanft, so sinnig. (text E.Geibel)
No. 4. All’ meine Herzgedanke. (text Paul Heyse)
No. 5. So halt’ ich endlich dich umfangen (text E.Geibel)

- Op. 36 (Not researched, probably published as part of a collection)
- Op. 37 Four piano pieces (Zittau, Loebel, 1893)

No. 1. Albumblatt.
No. 2. Märchen.
No. 3. Canzonetta.
No. 4. Perpetuum mobile.

- Op. 38 Motet Schaff in mir, Gott (Psalm 51) for mixed choir a cappella (Breslau, Offhaus Nachf., 1898)
- Op. 39 Motet Herr, Gott du bist for mixed choir a cappella and solo voices (Zittau, Loebel, 1893)
- Op. 40 Duo for 2 pianos (pianoforte) 4 hands (Zittau, Loebel, 1893, later in Leipzig, Reinecke)
- Op. 41 Sonata for pianoforte and violoncello (Zittau, Loebel, 1893) (premiere: Breslau, May 1885)
- Op. 42 Three Canonical Duets for Pianoforte and Violoncello (Zittau, Loebel, ca. 1894)
- Op. 43 Three Lieder for mixed choir (Teich, c. 1895) (erroneously advertised under the name of Gustav Flügel)

No. 1. ber allen Gipfeln (text J.W. v. Goethe)
No. 2. Der du vom Himmel (text J.W. v. Goethe)
No. 3. Die Sterne sind verblichen (text Hoffmann v. Fallersleben)

- Op. 44 (Not researched, probably published as part of a collection)
- Op. 45 (Not researched, probably published as part of a collection)
- Op. 46 Four Lieder for one medium voice with piano accompaniment (Breslau, Becher, 1900)

No. 1. Durch den Wald: Nur einmal noch lass mich mit dir geh’n.
No. 2. Frühling sprosst zu meinen Füssen.
No. 3. Des Müden Abendlied: Verglommen ist das Abendroth. (text E. Geibel)
No. 4. Wo du hingehst, da will auch ich hingehen m. Pfte od. Org.

- Op. 47 Four Lieder for mezzo-soprano or baryton with piano accompaniment (Breslau, Offhaus, 1897)

No. 1. In die Ferne: Siehst du im Abend Wolken ziehn. (text Hermann Kletke)
No. 2. Nachtigall, dir klag’ ich's.
No. 3. Könnt’ ich dir am Herzensgrund.
No. 4. Mutter, o sing’ mich zur Ruh. (text Freiligrath)

- Op. 48 – published as Op. 60 at the request of the editor.
- Op. 49 – published as Op. 60 at the request of the editor.
- Op. 50 Three sacred songs for mixed choir

No. 1. Selig sind, die reinen Herzens sind.
No. 2. Trauungsgesang: Zwei Hände wollen heute sich. (text Karl Gerok)
No. 3. Unter tausend frohen Stunden with mezzo-soprano solo. (text Novalis)

- Op. 51 Motet Lobe den Herrn, meine Seele for mixed choir (Psalm 103) (Breslau, Becher, 1899)
- Op. 52 (Four Lieder for one medium voice with piano accompaniment)
- Op. 53 Four Lieder for a medium voice with pianoforte accompaniment (Breslau, Becher, 1900)

No. 1. Blau liegt der See.
No. 2. Und die Rosen, die prangen. (text W. Osterwald)
No. 3. Mein Schatz ist auf der Wanderschaft. (text W. Osterwald)
No. 4. O stille dies Verlangen. (text E. Geibel)

- Op. 54 Die Luft ist so still for mixed choir (Breslau, Becher, 1900) (text Wolfgang Müller)
- Op. 55 Motet: Wie lieblich sind deine Wohnungen for 4-8 part mixed choir (Breslau, Becher, 1900)
- Op. 56 Four Lieder for one voice with piano accompaniment (Breslau, Becher, ca. 1901)

No. 1. Nun ist mit seinem lauten Treiben (text Franz Theodor Kugler)
No. 2. Leise Andacht
No. 3. Das Kätzchen
No. 4. Bergmannslied

- Op. 57 Three Songs for Women's Choir (Breslau, Becher, ca. 1901)
- Op. 58 Kirchweihfestmotet for two choirs (male choir: ecclesia terrestris and female choir: ecclesia coelestis) and 4 liturgical movements (Leipzig, Leuckart, 1902). (Composed for the inauguration of the renovated St. Bernhardinkirche in Breslau)
- Op. 59 Fifteen chorale preludes for organ (Leipzig, Leuckart, 1902), dedicated to Max Ansorge

1. Christus der uns selig macht
2. Du klagst und fühlest die Beschwerden
3. Es ist das Heil uns kommen her
4. Es ist gewisslich an der Zeit
5. Freu dich sehr, o meine Seele
6. Herzlich thut mich verlangen
7. In dich hab’ ich gehoffet
8. Lasst mich gehn
9. Mache dich mein Geist bereit
10. Nun ruhen alle Wälder
11. Vom Himmel hoch
12. Derselbe Choral
13. Derselbe Choral
14. Wach auf, mein Herz, und singe
15. Wenn ich ihn nur habe

- Op. 60 Three Piano Pieces (Breslau, Hainauer, c. 1902) (Op. 48. published as Op. 60 at the request of the editor).

No. 1. Erinnerung
No. 2. Neues Hoffen
No. 3. Entsagung

- Op. 61 Walzer, C-dur (Breslau, Hainauer, around 1902) (Op. 49. auf Wunsch d. Verlegers als Op. 61 ersch.)
- Op. 62 Wohl bin ich nur ein Ton sacred Lied for mixed choir (Leipzig, Leuckart, 1905)
- Op. 63 Two Sacred Songs for [6 and 8st.] mixed choir (Leipzig, Leuckart, 1904)

Nr. 1: Stern auf den ich schaue
Nr. 2: So nimm denn meine Hände

- Op. 64 Vier Lieder für eine mittlere Singstimme with piano accompaniment (Breslau, Becher, 1907)

No. 1. Das Schwerste (text Wilhelm Jensen)
No. 2. Letzt Stunde (text Marie Tyrol)
No. 3. Einst (text Karl Stieler)
No. 4. Waldseligkei (text Richard Dehmel)

- Op. 65 Psalm 126. Wenn der Herr die Gefangenen for mixed choir (Leipzig, Leuckart, 1907)
- Op. 66 14 Kanonische Choralvorspiele for Organ (Leipzig, Klinner, 1909)
- Op. 67 Stark ist des Todes rauhe Hand by J. F. Schlez, for mixed choir (Leipzig, Klinner, 1910)

=== B) Works without opus number ===
- Pfingstmotette Die Liebe Gottes ist ausgegossen for mixed choir (Leipzig, Klinner)
- Ein Seufzer for organ. In Diebold, Joh. Op. 70: 175 neue Orgelstücke
- Lasst mich gehen Sostenuto (G-Dur, C) for organ. In Der Praeludist. Sammlung etc. Editor A. Jacob E. Richter Nr. 858, p. 81
- Wenn ich nur ihn habe Sehr innig für Orgel. In Der Praeludist. No. 862, p. 86
- Ruhe sanft for male choir (text F.A. Köthe) in Ewald Röder (ed.): Trauergesänge (Nr. 31)
- Selig sind die reines Herzens sind Motet for mixed choir. in Rudolf Palme Op. 59
- Ich stand auf Berges Halde f. eine Singstimme mit Klavier. in Bernhard Brähmig Op. 6 (No. 6)
- Der Herr ist meine Stärke Psalm 28.7-9 f. mixed choir. in Heinrich Pfannschmidt (ed.): 32 Sprüche für gemischten Chor. (No. 32)
- Wir sind ein Volk vom Strom der Zeit (text Rudolf Kögel) Monatsschrift für Gottesdienst Jg. 11 (1906) Musikbeilage pp. 355–358.
- Bitte "Weil auf mir du dunkles Auge" (text N. Lenau) for male choir and female choir (Breslau, Hainauer) (1907)

=== C) Lost works ===
- Die Höh’n und Thäler singen. Lied with pianoforte accompaniment (1862/63)
- Miserere mei Deus, a tercet with choir (1863)
- Salvum fac regem for male choir (1865)
- Aus dem Felde 1871 Pianofortestücke (1871)
- Concertouverture Wanderlust (1877/84)
