= Marienkirche, Prenzlau =

German church

Coordinates: 53°18′49″N 13°51′24″E

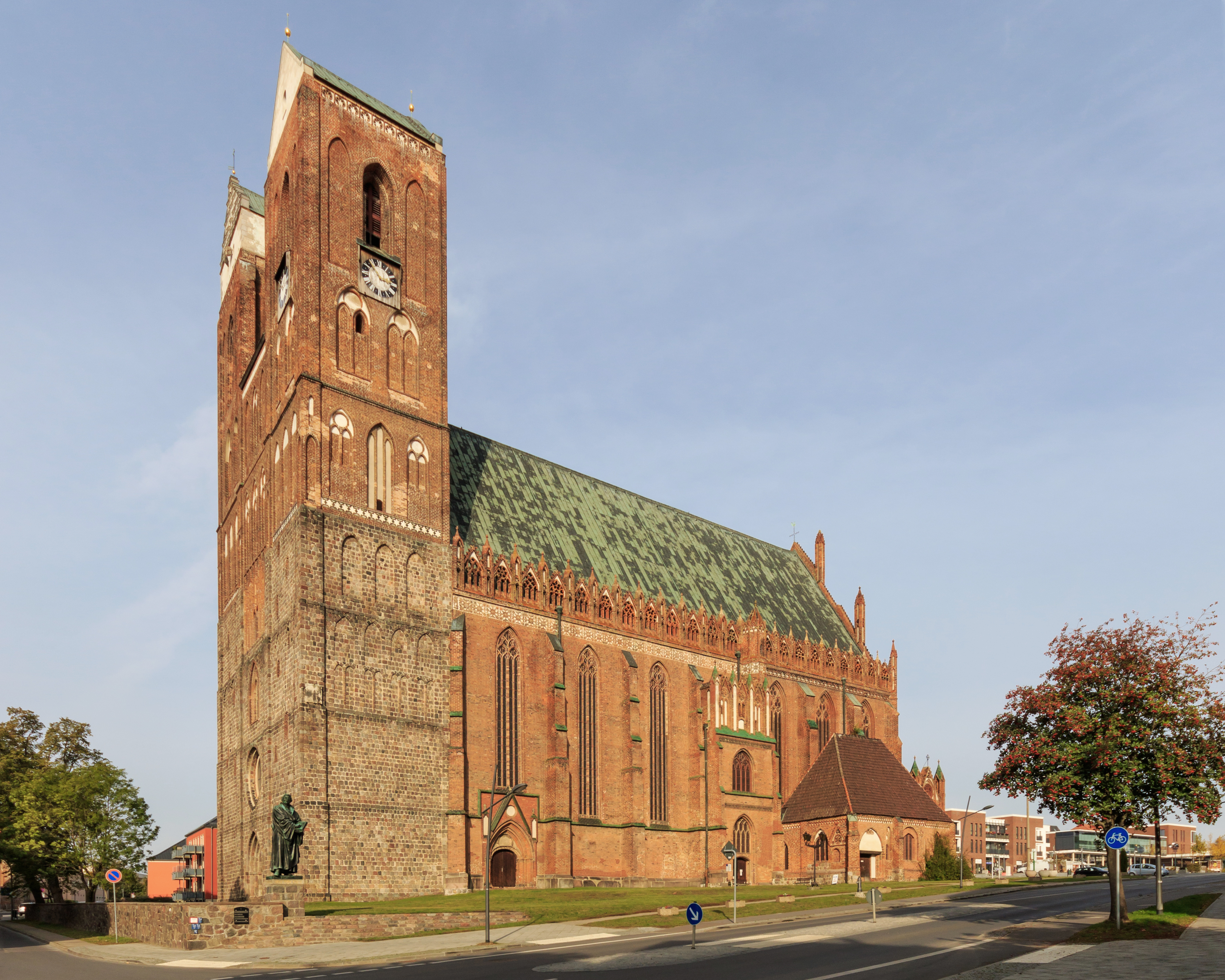
The Marienkirche

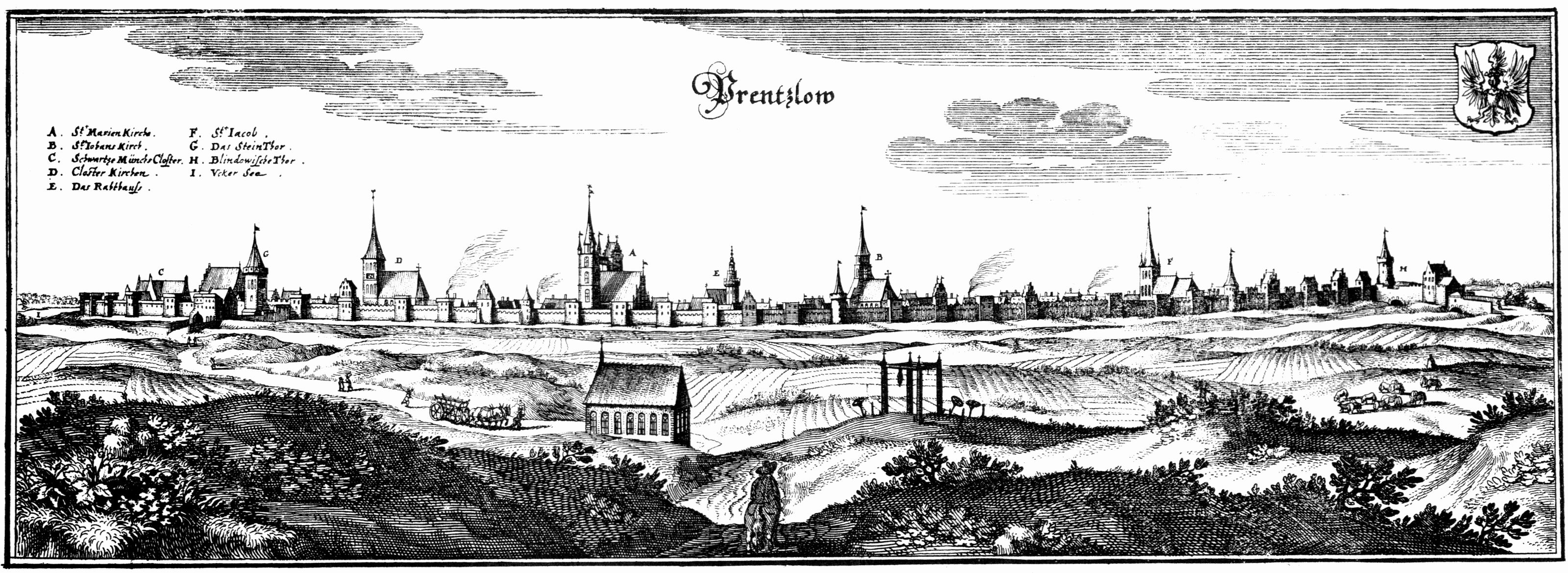
Merian-Stadtansicht von 1652

The Marienkirche (St. Mary's Church) in Prenzlau, Brandenburg, Germany, is the main Protestant parish church in the town, and is one of the most ornate churches of the Brick Gothic style in northern Germany. The church is a listed building.

== History ==
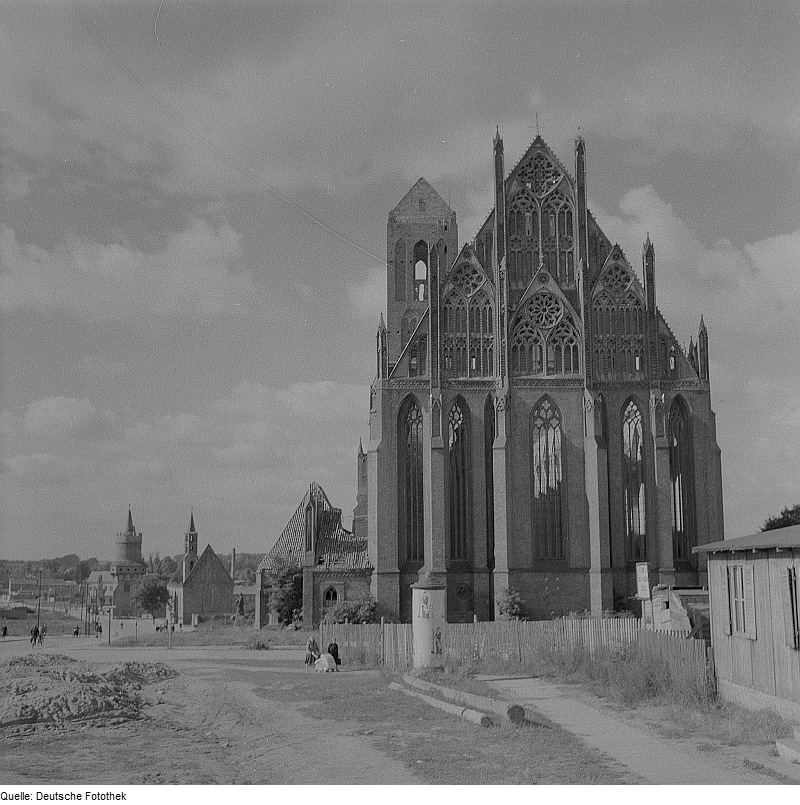
Ruins after 1950

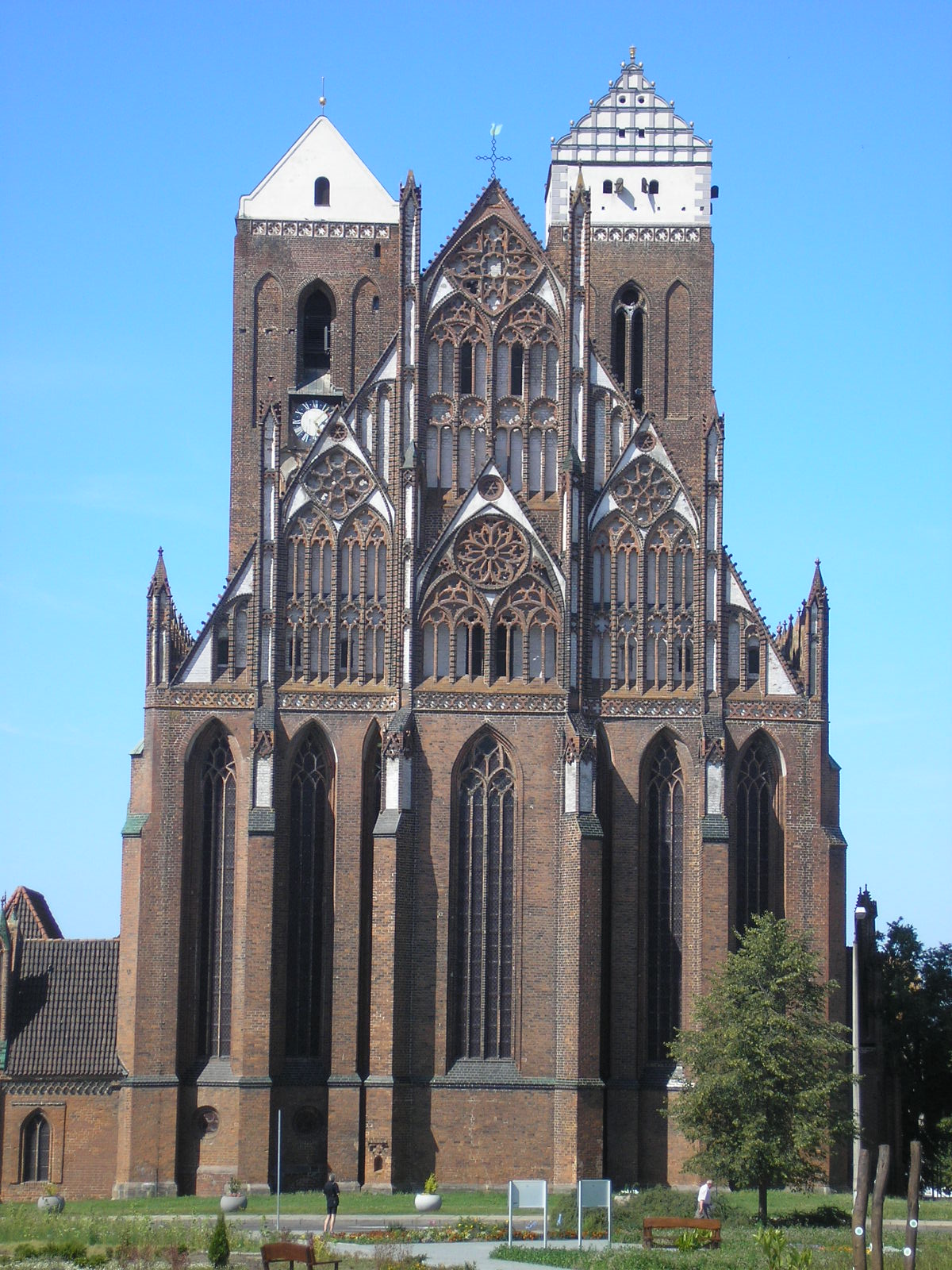
Showcase façade in the east, 2009

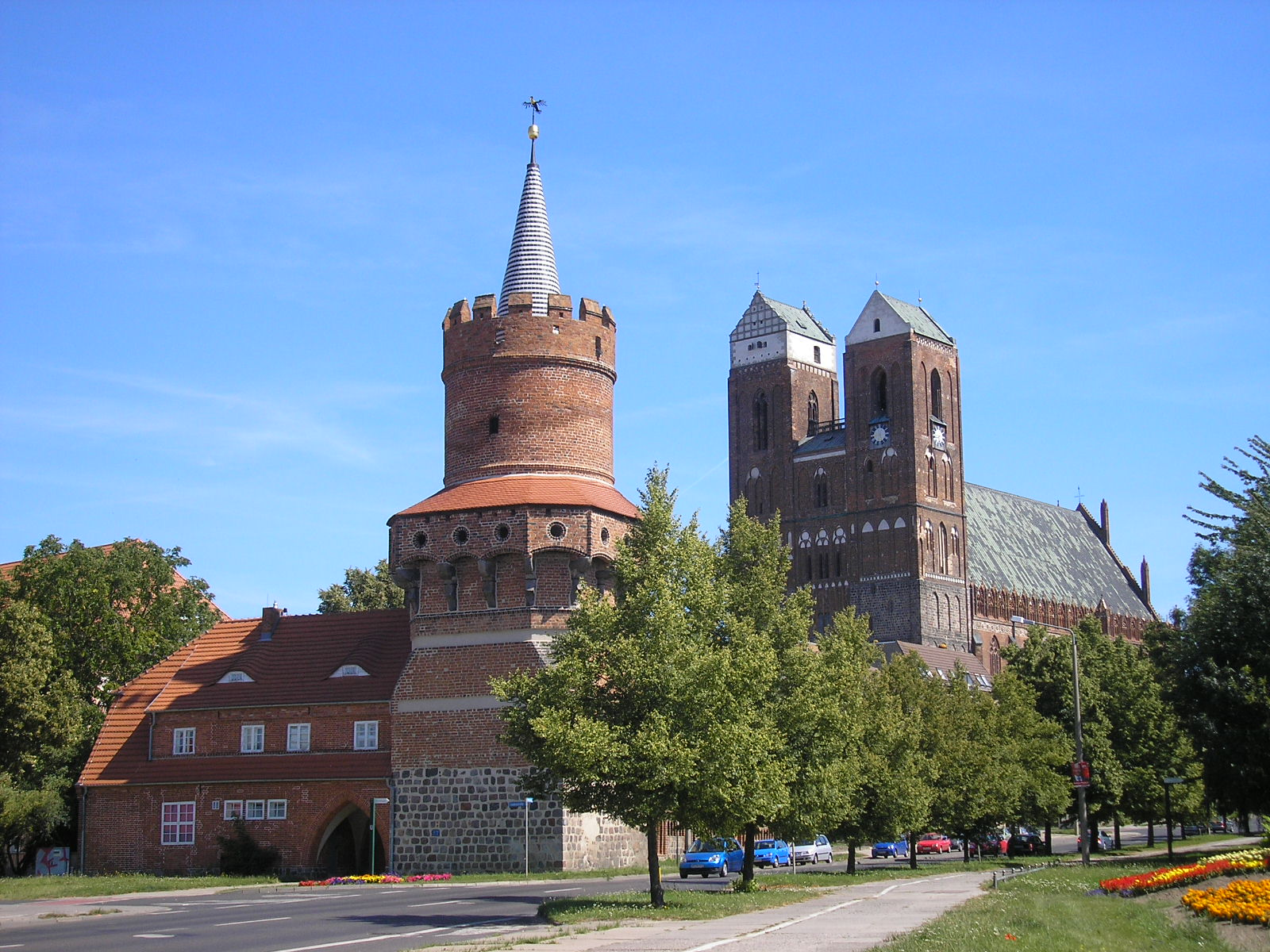
Middle Gate Tower and Marienkirche

=== Predecessor building ===
The predecessor building was built from 1235 to 1250 as a three-nave fieldstone hall church with a two-bay nave, a little wider transept and an indented straight choir. After the middle of the 13th century, the still preserved two-tower west building was added to this structure.

=== High Gothic new building ===
From 1289 to 1340, the new church was built as a three-aisled Gothic hall church in the brick Gothic style, incorporating the western part of the predecessor building of fieldstone masonry. The spacious church with seven baies is 56 metres long, 26 metres wide and 22 metres high; the ridge of the roof is now 43 metres high. It was built in two sections, the boundary of which runs by the stair towers. It has a relatively flat, apsidal east end for each nave.

In the 14th and 15th centuries, the additions of the St. Christopher's Chapel with a show gable and the two-nave, three-bay St. Margaret's Chapel with a polygonal end on the south side were added. The ribbed vault of the Margareten Chapel was preserved. A two-storey porch adjoins to the west. On the north side, a porch crowned by a tracery gable in the style of Hinrich Brunsberg was built.

==== Façade ====
The magnificent eastern façade is considered "unique" in brick Gothic style because of its sophisticated construction; its individual forms are modelled on the Fassadenrisse F of the Cologne Cathedral. The flat gable stands above the east end of the three naves. The apses are therefore only slightly developed with two polygon sides in the side aisles and three in the central nave. A unique feature is that the windows oriented towards the polygonal apses on the inside were fitted into the plane façade on the outside, resulting in sloping window reveals.

At 22 metres, the gable is as high as the vertical choir wall. The six buttresses end in ornamental pinnacles. A window-like design with bar and traceries made of red and black glazed stones, with gables and friezes.

==== Side walls ====
The outer side walls are divided by the four-part windows and the multiple stepped buttresses. Protruding over the eaves above a tracery frieze and between fial pilars is a transparent wreath of openwork lashings. A panel frieze with plant motifs runs along the four west joches of the south side.

==== Porch and portals ====
The northern porch from the beginning of the 15th century has a three-part Wimperg gable in the Brunsberg style. The large five-stepped west portal has fillets and round bars in the steps. Above it, towards the central nave, is a round window. A richly designed portal is on the north side, another on the south side.

==== Towers ====
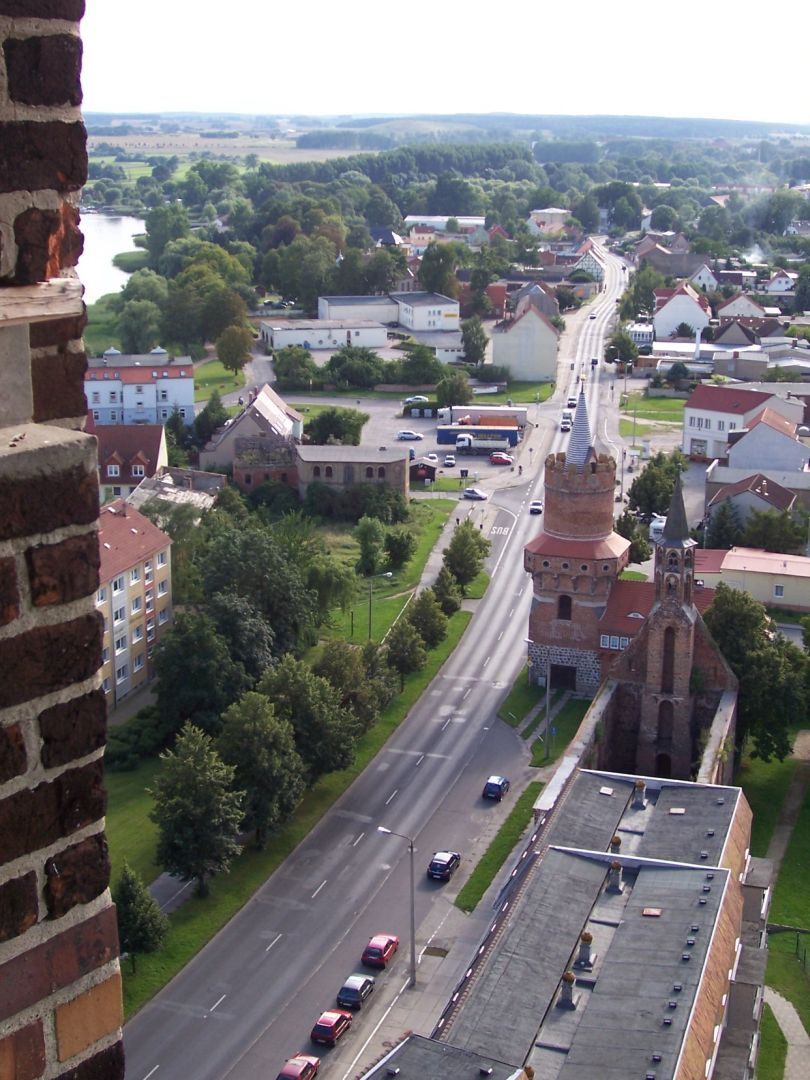
View from the tower

The lower floors of the west building, made of fieldstone, are articulated with corner pilasters and flat fascias. In the 14th century, three brick storeys were added to the towers of the original west building, and the central section was given two brick storeys. The north tower, 68 metres high, is topped by a gable roof in an east–west direction between two Renaissance architecture gables. 234 steps lead to the Türmerstube.

The completion of the south tower, 64 metres high, took place in 1776. Since 1972, it too has had a gable roof like the north tower, but without the 4-metre-high plinth. Two clocks were installed in the upper storey.

The upper storeys of the towers are more richly articulated with 14th-century pointed-arch blende and have high pointed-arch sound openings with simple tracery in the bell storeys. Despite the inclusion of the older parts of the wall of the predecessor building and the fragmentary tower ends, the west building has a distinctly monumental effect that is comparable with the high and late Gothic parish churches in Wismar and Stralsund.

==== Interior ====
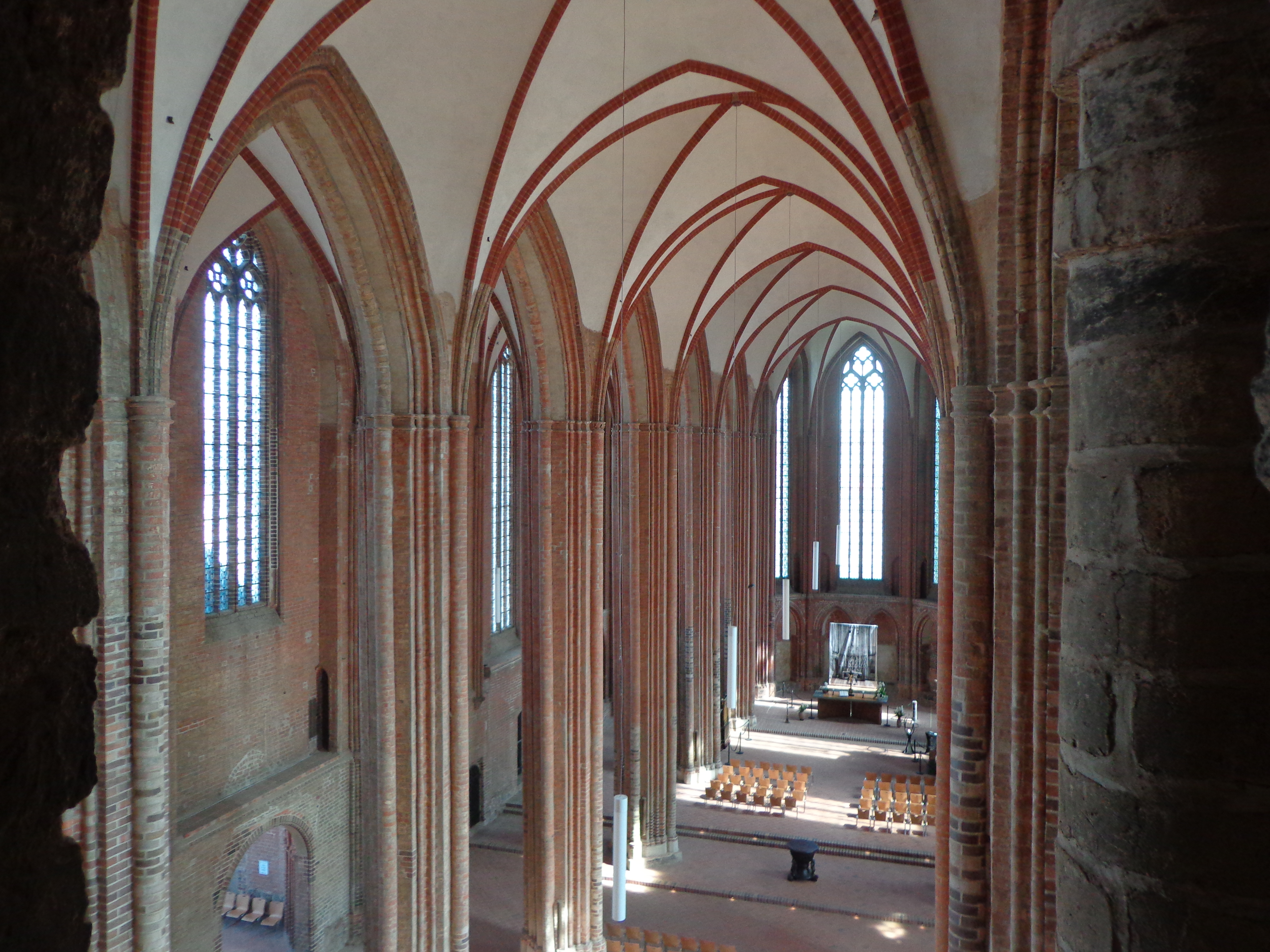
Inside the church

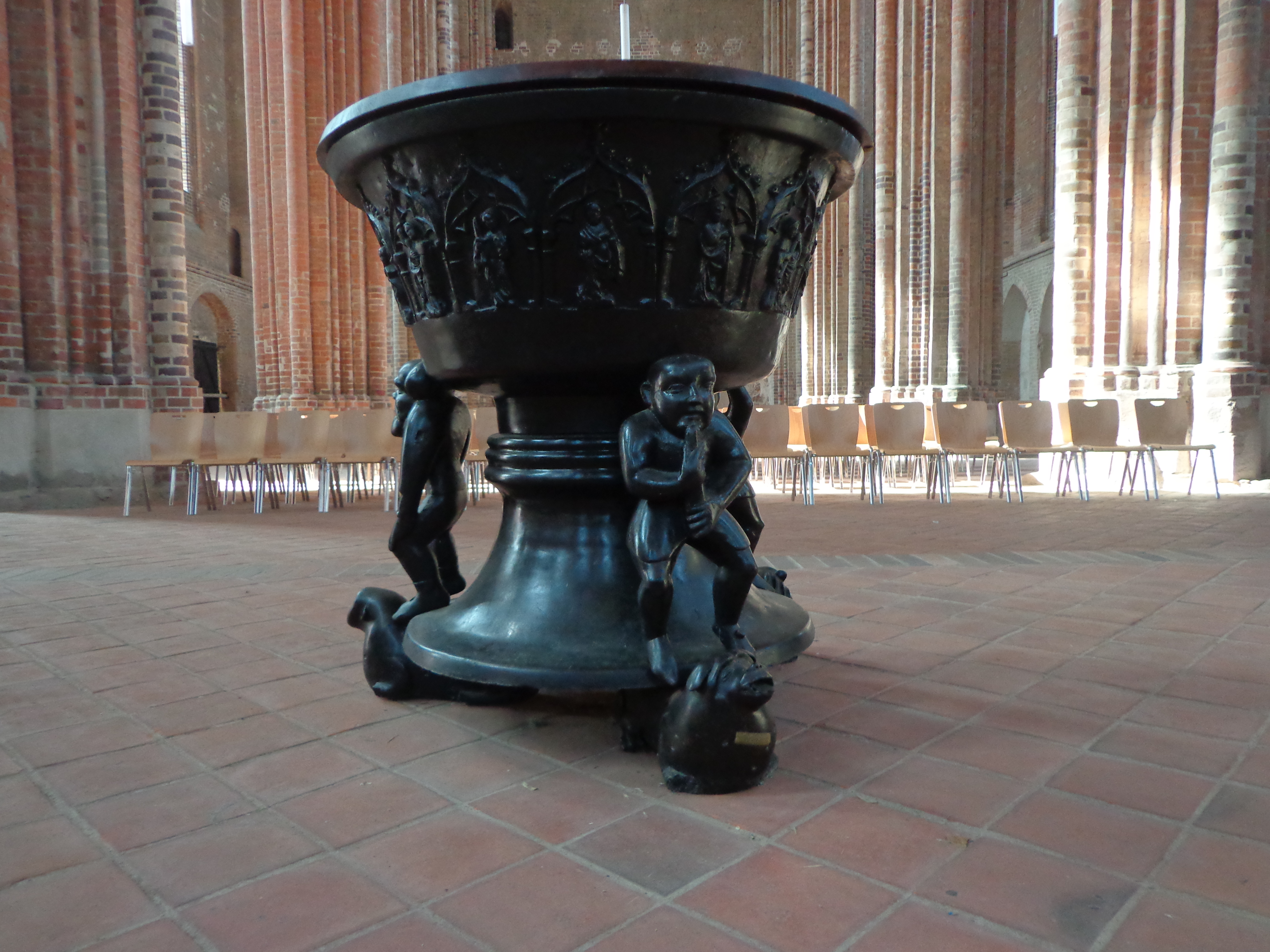
The baptismal font

In the spacious, austerely kept interior, the cross ribbed vault with intervening separating arch was supported by the twelve richly designed, cruciform piers; the four frontal pier projections have strong Three-quarter round services (templates). The side walls have circumferential plinth zones with two pointed-arched diaphragms per bay. Above this is a walkway. The slender tracery windows are mostly in four parts. The window tracery was changed during the restorations; the tracery of the three eastern windows on the south side could be considered original. The finely profiled High Gothic interior of the church occupies a certain exceptional position within the Brick Gothic style due to these very characteristics.

In front of the high altar was the tombstone of Adelheid von der Asseburg († 1588), wife of Leonhard von Kotze, her portrait was in the right aisle. From 1581 to 1918, on the basis of a bequest, the bell was rung daily in the hour of her death at about two o'clock in the afternoon, until her endowment lapsed in the course of inflation; thus her memory remained alive in the parish.

The circular window in the west, designed by Johannes Schreiter in 1995, combines the motif of the cross with colours and abstract forms that are intended to recall suffering, destruction, war and reconstruction.

=== Between Reformation and modern times ===
The later court and cathedral preacher in Berlin, Johannes Fleck (1559–1628), worked as inspector (superintendent) at St Mary's Church in Prenzlau from 1596 to 1601.

During the Thirty Years' War, the body of the Swedish king Gustavus Adolphus of Sweden was kept in the north tower of St Mary's Church from 20 to 22 December 1632 as part of the transfer to Sweden.

In 1844/46, the interior of the church was extensively remodelled in the Neo-Gothic style by Eduard Knoblauch. Between 1878 and 1887, the exterior of the church was restored.

=== Reconstruction ===
At the liberation of Prenzlau at the end of World War II by the Red Army on 27/28 April 1945, the church burnt out with the massive roof truss of the nave and the vault collapsed; the enclosing walls and pillared arcades remained. In 1947, the gables of the north tower end, which had survived until then, collapsed. In 1949/50, the east gable was secured against collapse. The reconstruction began in 1970, in 1972 the assembly of the roof truss, in 1973/74 the covering of the gable roof with copper plates as well as the repair of the staircase in the towers and the covering of the Margaret Chapel. From 1972 to 1988, the tower facades were repaired, the interiors of the south chapels were refurbished and the east gable and the east south facade were restored. In 1982, the north tower was completed, in 1984 the roof of the south tower, in 1988 the roofing and vaulting of the north porch and in 1990/91 the renovation of the façade. In 1990, a celebration was held for what had been achieved. The modern rose window with the theme Destruction and Reconstruction was realised by the glass artist Johannes Schreiter and handed over in 1995. In 1997, the altar was put up again.

Donations have been collected since 2013 for the reconstruction of the vaults and the gallery. In 2014, the budget of the State Minister for Culture of Brandenburg provided additional funds of 3.24 million euros for this purpose. Since August 2015, the tenders and preparations for the reconstruction of the vaults have been undertaken. From June 2018 until the end of 2020, the reconstruction of the vaults was planned. After initial delays, the construction work went according to plan. By April 2019, three of the seven bays had been completed, and by August 2019, five. The reconstruction of the vaults was completed as planned in 2020. On 14 January 2020, the last keystone of the vaults was set. On 17 May 2020, a service was held to mark the completion of the vaults in the neighbouring church of St Jacob. After completion of the work on the gallery and the organ, the restored interior of Marienkirche will be used for services again in autumn 2021.

== Furnishings and organ ==
=== High altar ===
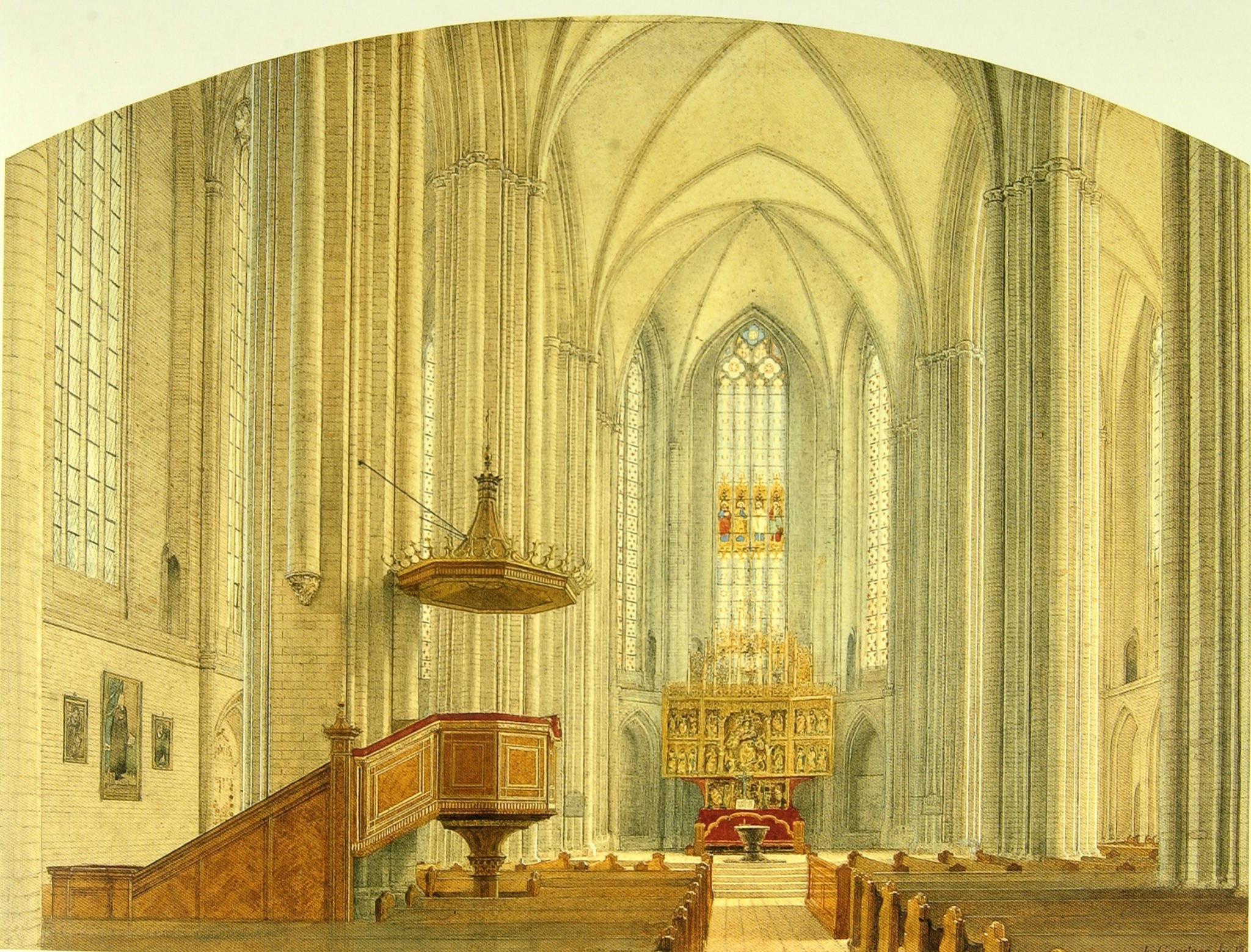
The interior of the church 1877 (by Eduard Gärtner)

The late Gothic high altar was created around 1512 by the Master of the Prenzlau high altar in Lübeck. It survived the destruction of the church because it had been walled in and was placed in the Dominican Monastery Prenzlau until 1991. After a theft in that year, a large part of the stolen figures could be returned, but some figures are still missing today. Afterwards, the figures and reliefs were restored, exposing the original version, and arranged in a reconstructive structure.

The shrine depicts a Woman of the Apocalypse originally surrounded by four angels, only two of which have survived. To the side of this are four smaller saints arranged in two rows. In the wings, the apostles are depicted in two rows, of which only nine are preserved. In the predella is a relief of the Adoration of the Magi. The sprinkling shows the depictions of Christ with the flag of victory, Saint George and Saint Maurice and a crowning Madonna in a halo.

=== Organ ===
In 1567/68 the first pipe organ was installed. In 1743, a new organ with 2 manuals and about 20 stops by Johann Michael Röder followed. In 1847, after the remodelling of the church, the new organ with 2 manuals and 33 stops by Carl August Buchholz from Berlin could be inaugurated. In 1945, it was destroyed and has not yet been replaced. After the restoration of the vaults by 2020, the installation of a historic organ by William Hill & Son from 1904 is also planned by 2021, which will be transported here as a donation from the former West Parish Church Kilbarchan in Scotland.

In 1867, Ernst Flügel organist and gymnasium singing teacher in Prenzlau was also active as pianist and organist at the Marienkirche until 1879.

== Surroundings ==
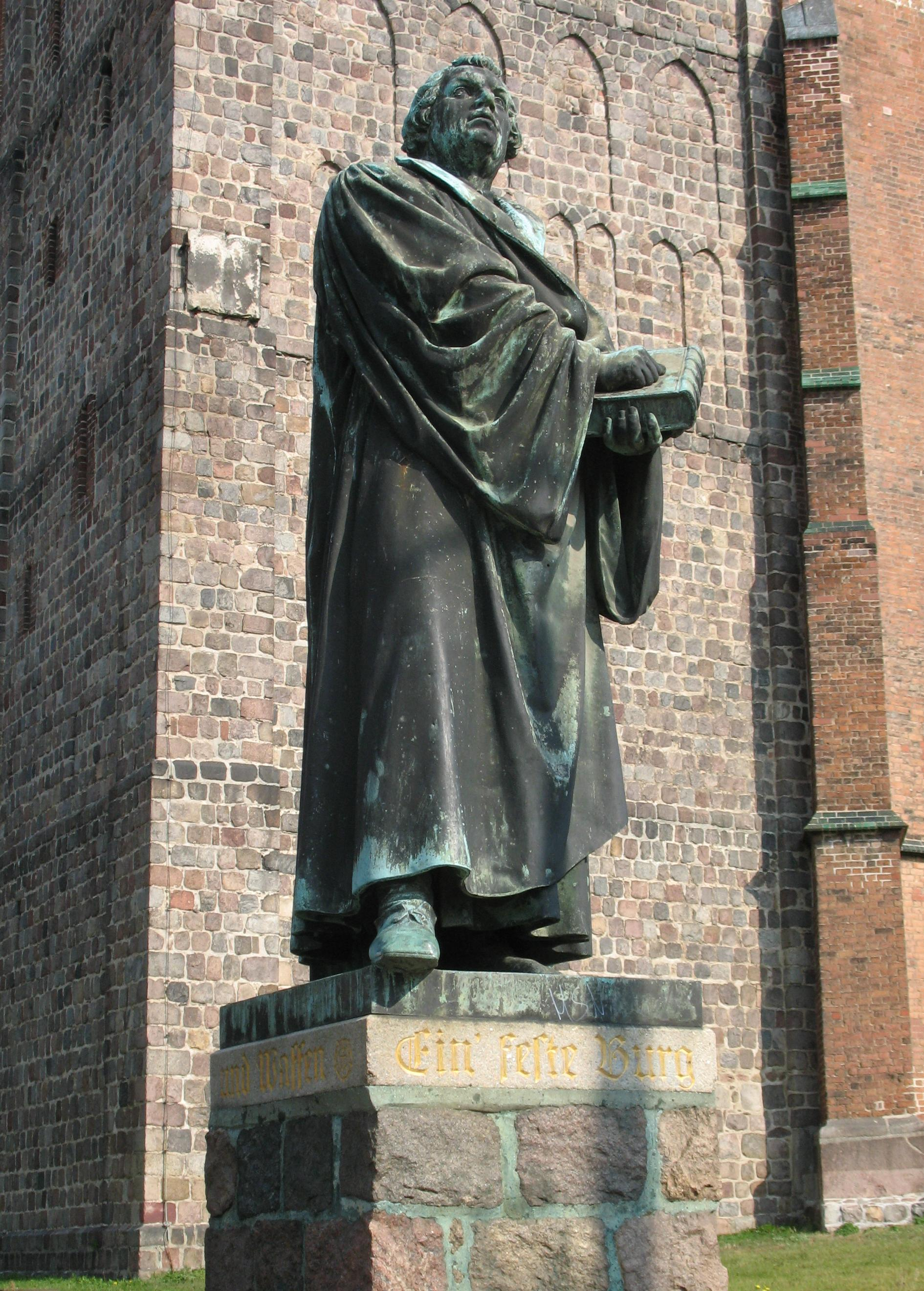
Luther monument

The central gate tower and Marienkirche on the Marktberg together form Prenzlau's best-known town view. Until its destruction in 1945, a row of mostly two-storey houses stood in front of the east view of the church, giving the scale for Marienkirche and thus increasing the monumentality of the east gable.

In front of the church, on the south-west side, is the Luther monument, modelled on the Original in Worms by Ernst Rietschel, which was created in 1903.

== Parish ==
The Marienkirche is the main Protestant parish church of the parish with the daughter churches of St. Nicolai, St. Jacobi and St. Sabini and twelve other parishes. It is a member of the Prenzlau church district with its twelve parishes. The church district is led by a superintendent and the district church council.

The preservation of the church is the responsibility of the "Förderverein Marienkirche Prenzlau".
