= Barbara Flügel =

German artist, designer and author

Barbara Flügel (born in Naila, Germany) is a contemporary German artist, designer and author who works in porcelain. She is the founder and has been the CEO of Barbara Flügel Porzellan.

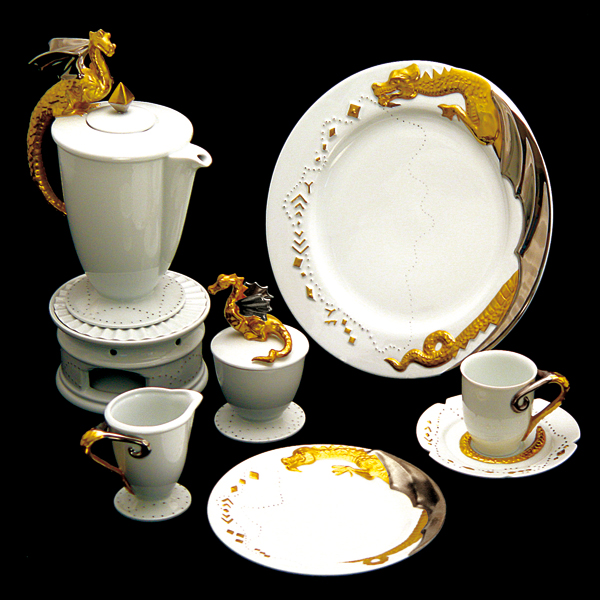
Dragonware in gold and platinum by Barbara Flügel

== Life ==
Flügel was born in Naila. She studied design at the Johann Friedrich Böttger Institute in Selb.

She operates her own company offering limited edition porcelain articles.

== Awards and notable achievements ==
Flügel has been recognized with numerous awards such as the Gold Medal from the Zentralverband des Deutschen Handwerks (ZDH) and a prize for design from the Arbeitsgemeinschaft der bayerischen Handwerkskammern.

She was chosen as the principal porcelain designer for the 2008 Beijing Olympic Games.

== Publications ==
- Porcelain decorations, Barbara Flügel, Frech-Verlag (Stuttgart), 1989, ISBN 3-7724-9977-5 (Translated from German)
