= Johann Joachim Bellermann =

German academic, botanist and herbalist (1754–1842)

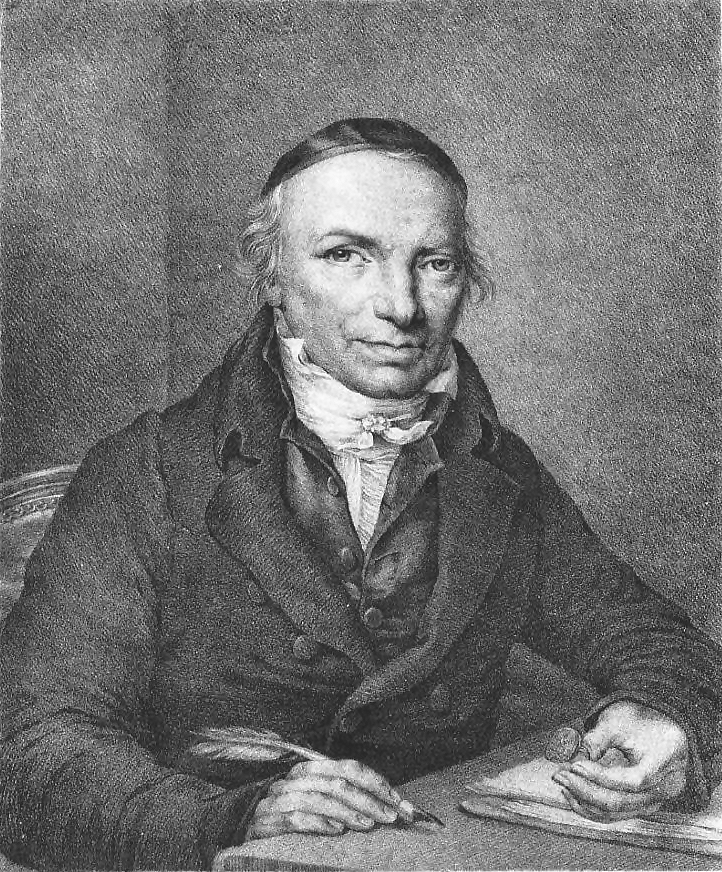
Johann Joachim Bellermann

Johann Joachim Bellermann (23 September 1754 – 25 October 1842) was a German Hebraist and professor of theology at Berlin University. He was one of the earliest students of Hebrew epigraphy.

== Life ==
He was born at Erfurt. On graduating from the University of Göttingen Bellermann accepted a position as teacher at Reval, Russia, where he remained for four years. On his return to Erfurt in 1782, he became "Magister legens" in the gymnasium, and later assistant professor of theology and philosophy in the University of Erfurt. In 1804 he was appointed director of the Gymnasium zum Grauen Kloster at Berlin, and professor of theology at the university in that city. He died in Berlin.

== Works ==
Among his numerous writings on various subjects are the following:

- "De Inscriptionibus Hebraicis Erfordiæ Repertis," printed in the Gymnasium Program, i.-iv., 1793–94;
- "De Duodecim Lapidibus in Jordanis Laveo Erectis," 1795;
- "De Ænigmatibus Hebraicis," Prog. i.-iv., 1796-1800;
- "De Usu Palæographiæ Hebraicæ ad Explicanda Biblia Sacra, cum Tribus Tabulis Æri Incisis";
- "Ueber den Kunstvollen Plan im Buche Hiob," 1813;
- "Versuch einer Metrik der Hebräer," 1813;
- "Geschichtliche Nachrichten aus dem Alterthum über Essäer und Therapeuten," 1821;
- "Die Urim und Thumim, die Aeltesten Gemmen; ein Beitrag zur Alterthumskunde," 1824.
