= Otto Flügel =

German philosopher and theologian

Otto Flügel (16 June 1842, Lützen – 9 July 1914, Dölau, Halle) was a German philosopher and theologian.

== Biography ==
He studied at Schulpforta and Halle, and took up pastoral work. He was made editor of the Zeitschrift für exacte Philosophie im Sinne des Neueren Philosophischen Realismus (“Journal for exact philosophy in the sense of the newer philosophical realism”), and in 1894 was one of the founders of Zeitschrift für Philosophie und Pädagogik. He was a supporter of Herbartian realism, as opposed to New-Kantian speculations, yet he believed in the necessity of a revelation.

== Works ==
Among his works may be mentioned:

- Die Spekulative Theologie der Gegenwart (“Speculative theology of the present”)
- Das Ich und die sittliche Idee im Leben der Völker (“The ego and the moral idea in the life of peoples,” 1892)
- Über die persönliche Unsterblichkeit (“On personal immortality,” 1902)
- Monismus und Theologie (“Monism and theology,” 1908)
