= Schuke =

Schuke is a surname, especially of a German family of organ builders. They ran a company, founded in 1920, from 1894, named Alexander Schuke Potsdam Orgelbau from 1990.

- Alexander Schuke (1870–1933), organ builder, founder and manager of the company in 1884
  - Hans-Joachim Schuke (1908–1979), organ builder
    - Matthias Schuke (1955–2025), organ builder
  - Karl Schuke (1906–1987), organ builder
