= Matthias Schuke =

German organ builder (1955–2025)

- Schuke c. 2020
- Born: 7 July 1955; Potsdam, East Germany
- Died: 14 November 2025 (aged 70)
- Occupation: Organ builder
- Organizations: Alexander Schuke Potsdam Orgelbau
- Parent: Hans-Joachim Schuke
- Awards: Order of Merit of the Federal Republic of Germany

Matthias Schuke (7 July 1955 – 14 November 2025) was a German organ builder. He ran a company in Potsdam, Alexander Schuke Potsdam Orgelbau, in the third generation of a family workshop, and passed it to his sons. During his tenure, they built organs such as at the Erfurt Cathedral, the Magdeburg Cathedral, and at the Zamora Cathedral in Mexico, and restored historic organs, including the 1624 organ of St. Stephan in Tangermünde.

== Life and career ==
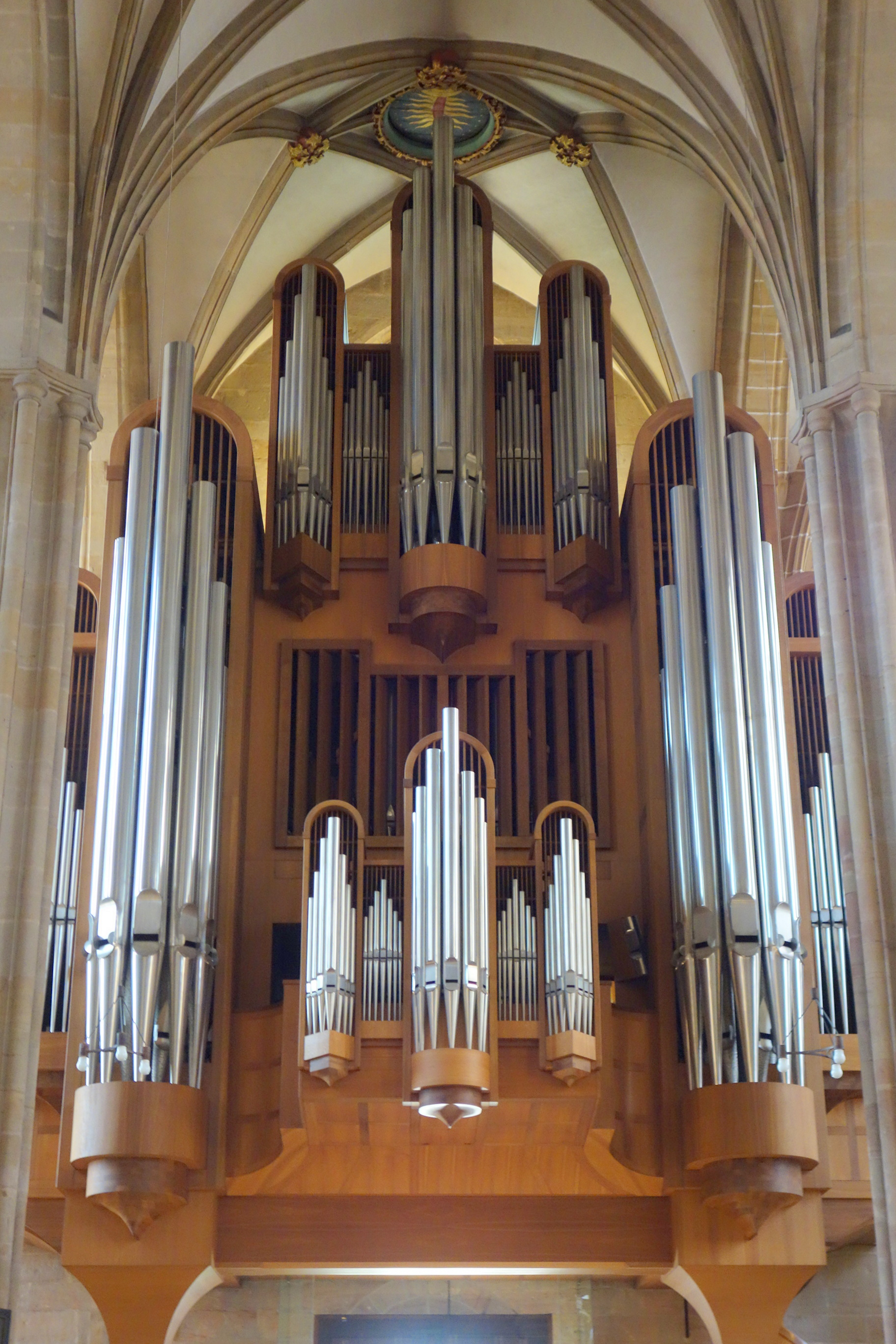
Schuke organ at the Erfurt Cathedral

Schuke was born in Potsdam on 7 July 1955, the son of Hans-Joachim Schuke who ran a workshop for building pipe organs founded in 1820 and taken over by his father Alexander Schuke in 1894. Hans-Joachim Schuke ran the workshop from 1933 together with his brother Karl Schuke, then from the 1950s alone until it became a state-owned company (Volkseigener Betrieb), Potsdamer Schuke Orgelbau, in 1972 under the GDR regime.

Schuke attended the Polytechnische Oberschule 24 (now Eisenhardtschule Potsdam), from 1962. He trained as a cabinetmaker at the Richard Praetsch carpentry workshop in Babelsberg from 1972 to 1974, required to become an organ builder. He then began training as an organ builder at Potsdamer Schuke Orgelbau, learning the craft all-round in the wood workshop, tin workshop, restoration and voicing departments; he completed his training in 1977. He also achieved the Abitur at evening school simultaneously. In 1985, he began his training as a master organ builder, passing the master craftsman's examination in 1988.

In 1990, Schuke managed to successfully reprivatise the company in the course of the political and economic Peaceful Revolution and was thereafter the owner and managing director of Alexander Schuke Potsdam Orgelbau.

During his time with the company, Matthias Schuke was able to realise major projects, in the Leipzig Gewandhaus (1981), the Erfurt Cathedral (1992), in the Zamora Cathedral in Mexico, both a choir organ and the main organ in the Königsberg Cathedral, and in the Magdeburg Cathedral. They built organs also in Australia, China, Russia and Taiwan. The company carried out restorations of historic organs including of St. Stephan in Tangermünde, built by Hans Scherer in 1624, in 1994, of the Brandenburg Cathedral in 1998, of St. Marien in Angermünde, and the Schwerin Cathedral.

In 2003, Schuke decided to leave the old small workshop premises, divided in three locations of the Dutch Quarter in Potsdam, to build a new company headquarters in Werder (Havel), moving in February 2004. In November 2017, he announced that he would gradually hand over the company to his sons Johannes (born 1985) and Michael (born 1989). The sons took over the company management in 2018.

Schuke died after a serious illness on 14 November 2025, at the age of 70. He was remembered as a keeper of the tradition of the workshop founded 205 years earlier as well as an innovator.

== Awards ==
In 1998, Schuke was awarded the Order of Merit of the Federal Republic of Germany as a committed personality in German organ building. In 2001, his company achieved first place in the Technology Transfer Prize of the Technology Foundation of the State of Brandenburg, together with the University of Potsdam. The company also received the 2001 Professor Adalbert Seifriz Prize, a nationwide craft prize from the Steinbeis Foundation in Stuttgart for innovations researched with Reimund Gerhard from the University of Potsdam. In 2009, the company was awarded the Zukunftspreis from the State of Brandenburg. In 2011, the company and Markus Abel, professor at the University of Potsdam, received the Professor Adalbert Seifriz Prize again.
