= Carl Eduard Gesell =

German organ builder (1845–1894)

Carl Eduard Gesell (11 May 1845 – 8 April 1894) was a German organ builder.

== Life ==
Born in Potsdam, Kingdom of Prussia, Gesell was trained in the Potsdam organ workshop of his father Carl Ludwig Gesell and with Franz Wilhelm Sonreck in Cologne. He then worked for Friedrich Meyer in Herford. After his father's death in 1867, he took over his father's Potsdam firm. He continued the tradition of the firm and built mainly single-manual organs for churches in the Mittelmark region. In addition, he won orders from abroad and exported organs to Buenos Aires and Constantinople, now Istanbul. In addition, he carried out a large number of organ conversions and repairs. Carl Eduard Gesell remained childless. After his death in 1894, his pupil Alexander Schuke took over the firm and developed it into the renowned Schuke company that would be named after him Alexander Schuke Potsdam Orgelbau in 1990.

== Works (selection) ==
=== Mittelmark and Argentina ===
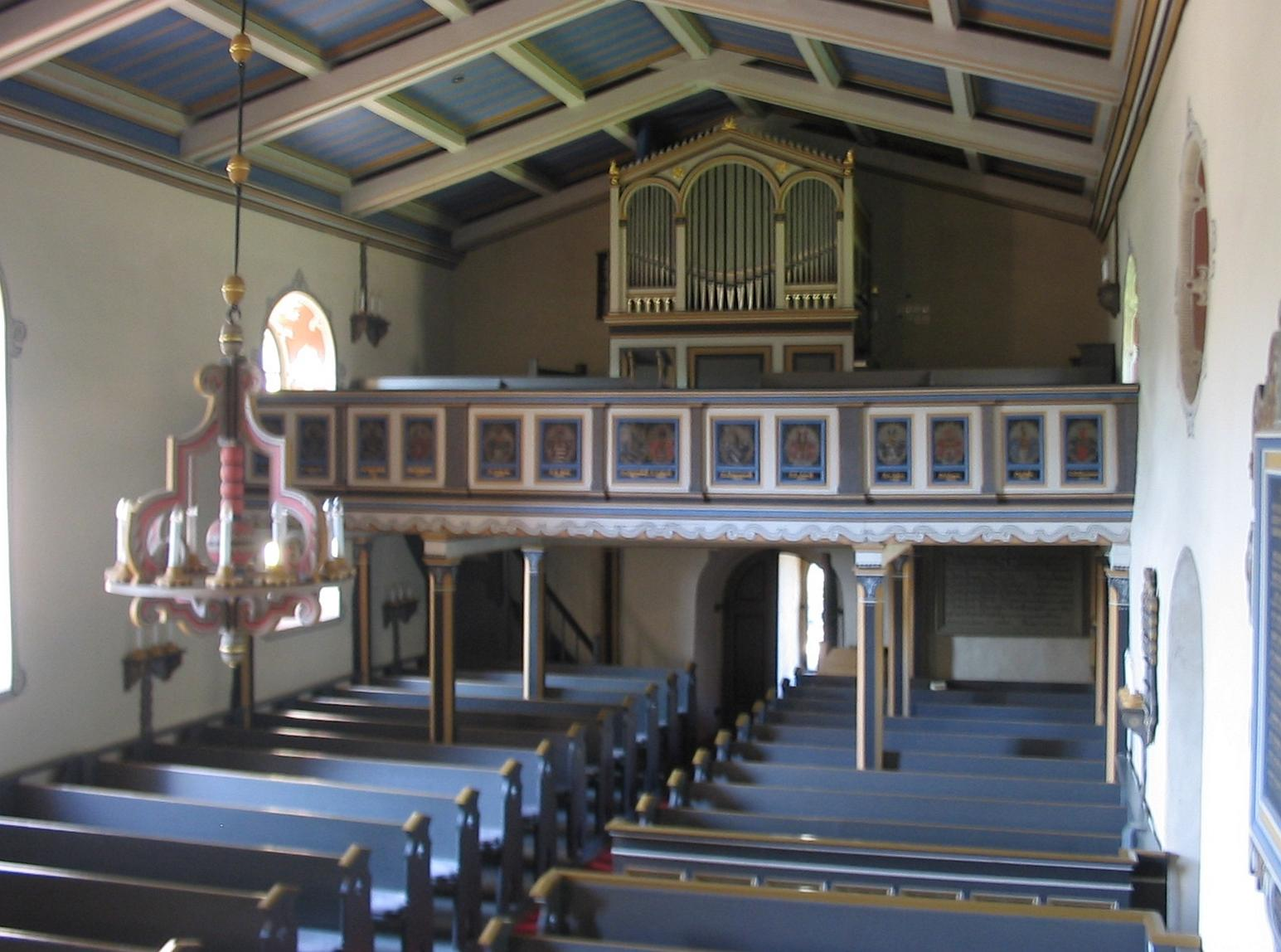
Gesell Organ from 1882 in the Dorfkirche Siethen

Among Gesell's most extensive new buildings were the organs for the Klosterkirche St. Pauli in Brandenburg an der Havel. (1868) with two manuals, 27 organ stops and pedal, for the German Protestant church in Buenos Aires (1871) with likewise two manuals, twelve stops and pedal and for the churches in Herzberg (1885) and Golm (1886) each with two manuals, eleven stops and pedal. Village churches equipped with new instruments by Carl Eduard Gesell include the village church of Satzkorn, the village church of Fresdorf, the village church of Siethen and the village churches of Grube, Dechtow and Alt Töplitz. In 1867 he extended the organ of the company founder Gottlieb Heise from 1847 in the Church of Peace, Potsdam from 18 to 25 stops. In 1882, he carried out a further conversion on the Joachim Wagner organ of 1731 in the Garnisonkirche. In 1887 he rebuilt the organ he himself had made in 1874 in the Neo-Gothic brick church in Paaren im Glien.

=== Organ of the Istanbul Kreuzkirche ===
On the occasion of the 120th anniversary of the Gesell organ in the Evangelical Church of the Holy Cross in Istanbul, the German-speaking congregation in Turkey published a commemorative publication in 2004. The organ was built in 1883 by Carl Eduard Gesell and installed and inaugurated in 1884. It was equipped with two manuals, one pedal and a total of twelve organ stops and two Koppels. The annual report of the congregation from the year 1882/83 notes among other things:

The church council hopes that the prospect of the organ, which is expected within a short time, will provide a new incentive for more diligent attendance of the church. At the beginning of this year, the local embassy councillor Max von Thielmann, who was delighted by the beautiful playing of organist Lange on the harmonium that had accompanied the church service singing until then, suggested to the congregation that they collect money for an organ. This collection, together with some gifts from outside, resulted in 150 Turkish lira or 1717 German gold mark. However, the total cost of an organ built for the conditions of the church by Gesell in Potsdam, including transport, installation and the necessary reconstruction of the organ choir, amounted to 5000 marks. Since the church council could not hope to raise this sum, Baron Thielmann guaranteed payment to the council and the organ builder, but obliged the council to help cover the costs as far as possible by organising a church concert after the organ had been installed. Also, the Imperial Ambassador, Mr von Radowitz, [...] made a grant from the slush fund His Majesty the King of Prussia, based on the fact that a grant from the same fund has recently been graciously made to the Embassy Chapel in Rome.

In 1964/65, the organ was redesigned by Werner Bosch and in the 2000s the congregation turned to the builder's workshop Alexander Schuke Potsdam Orgelbau to have it overhauled. Schuke was not aware of the organ's whereabouts until that time; the instrument was listed in the catalogue of works, but with the note "receipt unknown". In 2003, during a visit to Istanbul, Matthias Schuke discovered that of all the surviving Gesell organs, only the Istanbul one still had an original stop (Principal 8′) and the original casing.
