= Gottlieb Heise =

German organ builder (1785–1847)

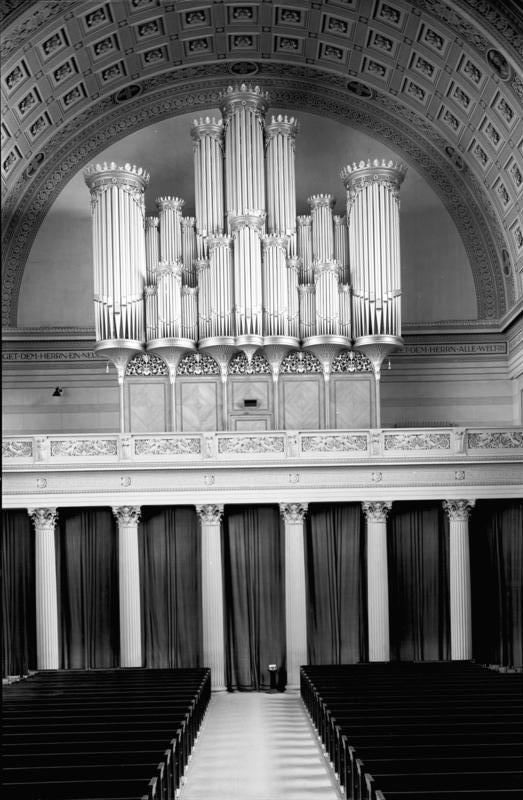
Heise organ from 1837 with extensions by Wilhelm Sauer from 1908 in the Potsdamer St. Nicholas Church.Destroyed during World War II.

Gottlieb Heise (23 March 1785 – 20 June 1847) was a German organ builder. In 1894, the renowned Schuke company later named Alexander Schuke Potsdam Orgelbau emerged from his Potsdam workshop.

== Life ==
Born in Querfurt, Electorate of Saxony, Heise was trained by Georg Christian Knecht in Tübingen. In 1820, he went to Potsdam and opened an organ workshop at 50 Charlottenstraße (Note: in the GDR-era Wilhelm-Pieck-Straße, renamed back in 1991) Heise was held in high esteem by the Prussian government, which promoted him. After his death in 1847, Carl Ludwig Gesell, who had previously been Heise's first assistant for eight years, took over the company. .

Carl Schultze, Friedrich Hermann Lütkemüller, Friedrich Kienscherf and probably also Georg Mickley were among his students.

Heise died in Potsdam, Kingdom of Prussia at the age of 62.

== Buildings (selection) ==
Today, 30 new organs are known to have been built by Gottlieb Heise, mainly in the Mittelmark region, as well as rebuilds and repairs. Some smaller instruments have been preserved.

New organ buildings

Year	Location	Building	Picture	Manual	Casing	Notes
1828	Kloster Lehnin	Klosterkirche St. Marien		I/P	11	First known new organ, replaced around 1975.
1834	Tarmow	Village church		I/P	8	Preserved
1835	Annenwalde	Dorfkirche		I/P	8	Restored
1836	Rüdersdorf	Church		II/P	12	Preserved?
1836	Herzberg (Mark)	Church				
1837	Potsdam	St. Nikolai			Extended by Wilhelm Sauer in 1908 to II/P, 26, destroyed in 1945.	
1840	Neuruppin	Klosterkirche St. Trinitatis		II/P	22	Not preserved.
1840	Schönerlinde	Village church		I/P	12	Replaced in 1931.
1841	Freyenstein	St. Marien		I/P	13	Preserved.
1841	Perwenitz	Village church		I/P	8	Preserved
1841	Michelsdorf	St. Michaelis		I/P	6	Preserved.
1842	Lütte near Belzig	Kirche		I/P	8	Preserved
1844	Sacrow bei Potsdam	Heilandskirche				
1844	Friesack	Church		II/P	17	Destroyed in 1945.
1845	Zerpenschleuse	Village church		I/P	9	Preserved.
1846	Mariendorf bei Berlin	Dorfkirche				
1846	Nieder Neuendorf	Dorfkirche		I/P	5	Preserved
1846	Trechwitz	Village church		I	5	Preserved
1846	Frankfurt (Oder)	Museum Viadrina		I/P	8	
1847	Potsdam	Friedenskirche		II/P	18	Last known new organ, extended and rebuilt several times; preserved
?	Woxfelde, Neumark, heute Głuchowo	Church		II/P	17	Probably not preserved.

Weitere Arbeiten

Year	Location	Building	Picture	Manual	Casing	Notes
	Havelberg	Dom		II/P	30	Umbau der Scholtze-Orgel von 1777
	Kyritz	St. Marien				Reubke-Orgel
	Saarmund	Kirche				
