= Alexander Schuke Potsdam Orgelbau =

Coordinates: 52.398347°N 12.913452°E

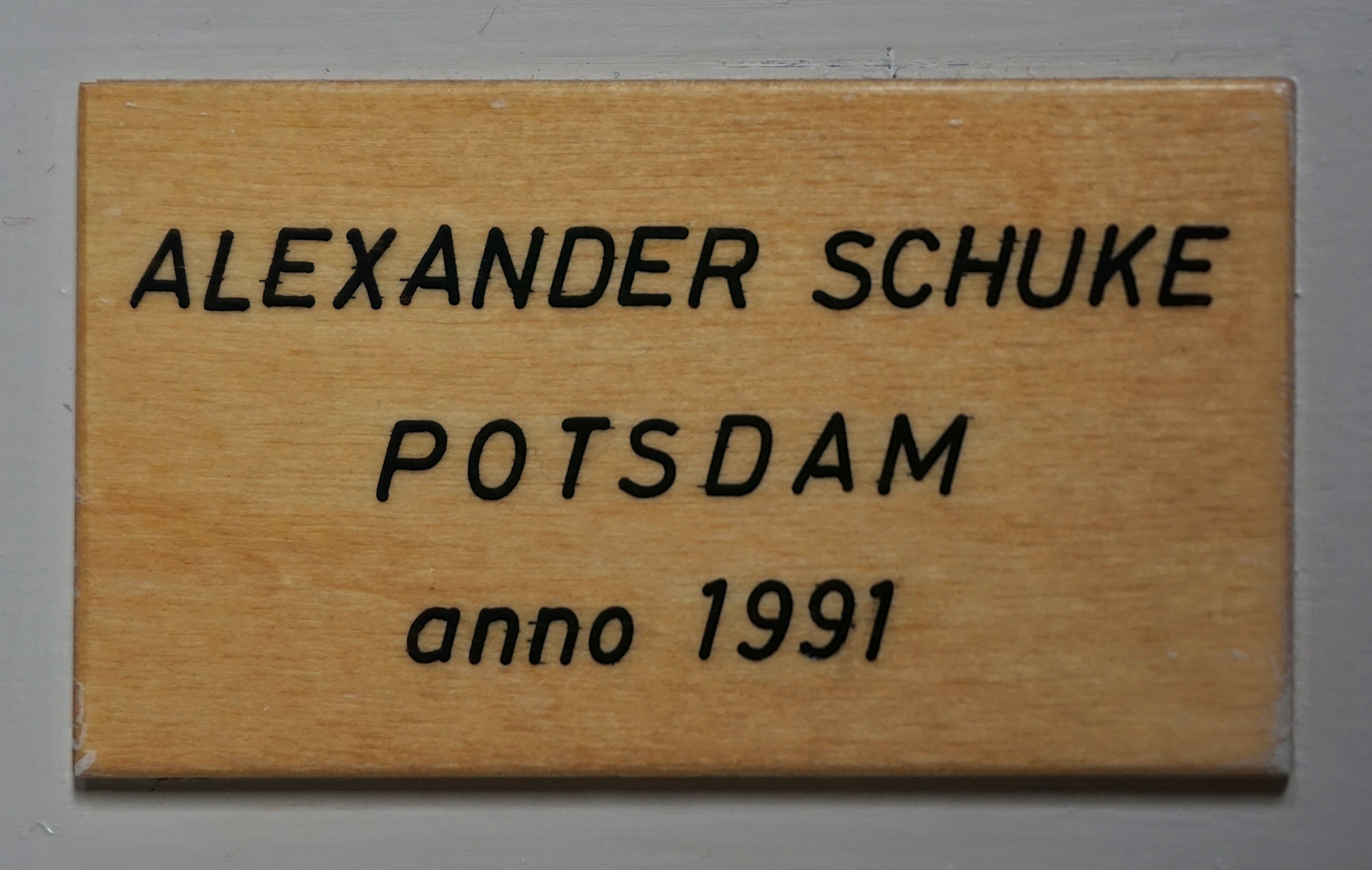
- trade mark at the Propsteikirche, Potsdam
- Type: GmbH
- Founded: 1820
- Headquarters: Werder (Havel)
- Key people: Michael Schuke, Johannes Schuke
- Products: Pipe organs
- Website: www.schuke.de

The Alexander Schuke Potsdam Orgelbau is a company to build pipe organs, founded in 1820 in Potsdam. It was taken over by Alexander Schuke in 1894, and by his sons Karl Schuke and Hans-Joachim Schuke in 1933. From 1950, Hans-Joachim Schuke ran the workshop, now in East Germany, from 1953. It became a VEB, Potsdamer Schuke-Orgelbau in 1972, but Matthias Schuke was able to reprivatise it in 1990 after German reunification, naming it after his grandfather Alexander Schuke Potsdam Orgelbau. He moved the workshop to Werder (Havel) in 2004 and passed leadership to his sons in 2018.

== History ==
The organ builder Gottlieb Heise founded the company in Potsdam in 1820, with a workshop in a courtyeard of a complex of buildings in the historic Dutch Quarter. In 1848, his pupil Carl Ludwig Gesell took over, first together with Gustav Schulz who soon founded his own workshop. His son Carl Eduard Gesell became head of the company in 1868. When he died without children in 1994, Alexander Schuke bought the company and made it one of the best-known organ building workshops in Brandenburg. When he died in 1933, his two sons, Karl Schuke and Hans-Joachim Schuke led the company jointly.

During World War II, Hans-Joachim Schuke was a Soviet prisoner of war. In 1950 the brothers decided to found a second workshop in West Berlin because of deteriorating conditions, both politically and economically, for manufacturing in the GDR. Hans-Joachim Schuke led the Potsdam section, while Karl Schuke moved to the new Karl Schuke Berliner Orgelbauwerkstatt. In 1972, the Potsdam branch became a state-owned Volkseigener Betrieb VEB Potsdamer Schuke-Orgelbau.

After German reunification, Matthias Schuke, in the third generation and working in the company from 1974, was able to reprivatise the workshop in 1990. He named it after his grandfather Alexander Schuke Potsdam Orgelbau. He moved the company to new premises in Werder (Havel) in 2004.

Schuke erhielt wichtige Aufträge für den Neubau von Orgeln für den Dom zu Erfurt, den Dom zu Magdeburg, den Dom zu Kaliningrad und auch für den Dom zu Zamora in Mexiko. Im 20. Jahrhundert In October 2018, Matthias Schuke passed leadership to his sons Johannes und Michael Schuke.

Musicologists appreciated the "romantic and symphonic sound" of Schuke organs, caused by diligent choice of material for the pipes and the production in their own workshop.

== List of works ==
The company's list of works has more than 630 new organs built between 1895 und 2024, more than 60 restoration works as of 2017, and expansions of existing organs.

The following selected works list features their year of completion, opus location, name of the building, an image, the numbers of manuals, pedals (P) and stops and, if available, an additional reference, notes, a link, and an external link to the entry on the organindex.de website.

Year	Op.	Location	Building	Image	Manuals	Stops	Notes
1895	1	Radewege	Dorfkirche		I/P	7	designed by Carl Eduard Gesell →
1906	28	Lübben (Spreewald)	Paul-Gerhardt-Kirche		II/P	29	
1908	45	Golßen	Stadtkirche		II/P	18	Schuke gibt in seinem Werkverzeichnis das Baujahr 1908 sowie 14 Register an; 2010 von Scheffler restauriert
1908	48	Toppel	Dorfkirche		I/P	4	heute in der Stadtkirche Bad Belzig, restauriert → Orgel
1911	64	Berlin-Schmöckwitz	Dorfkirche		II/P	8	→ Orgel
1912	75	Großbeeren	evang. Kirche		II/P	18	→ Orgel -->
1935	146	Zehlendorf (Berlin)	Emmaus-Kirche		II/P	25	Pionieering instrument of the organ reform movement; first Schleifladeninstrument of the company with mechanic tracture → organ
1936	153	Potsdam	St. Peter and Paul		III/P	41	→ organ
1953	243	Stendal	St. Nikolaus		III/P	56	→
1963	337	Tbilisi, Georgia	Tbilisi State Conservatoire		III/P	40	
1966	371	Leipzig	Thomaskirche		III/P	47	dismantled in 1999, 42 stops and other parts used for the Fürstenwalde Cathedral in 2005
1969	402	Magdeburg	Magdeburg Cathedral, transsept organ		III/P	37	
1981	499	Leipzig	Gewandhaus		IV/P	91	expanded by 2 stops in 2008
1988	552	Varna, Bulgaria	Festival Centre		III/P	53	
1992	583	Erfurt	Erfurt Cathedral		III/P	63	→ organ
1994	595	Tangermünde	St. Stephan		III/P	32	Restoration and reconstruction of the organ by Hans and Fritz Scherer (1624)
1997	606	Lublin, Poland	Henryk Wieniawski Philharmonie		III/P	51	
2003	614	Spandau	St. Marien am Behnitz		II/P	35	
2005	613	Fürstenwalde	St. Mary's Cathedral		IV/P	69	using parts of Op. 371, built in 1966 for the Thomaskirche in Leipzig (III/P/47)
2006	616	Kaliningrad, Russia	Königsberg Cathedral		II/P	32	→ choir organ
2008	618	Kaliningrad, Russia	Königsberg Cathedral		IV/P	90	→ main organ
2008	619	Magdeburg	Magdeburg Cathedral, main organ		IV/P	93	
2008	620	Zamora de Hidalgo, Mexiko	Diocesan Sanctuary of Our Lady of Guadalupe		III/P	51	
2014	630	Pingtung City, Taiwan	Pingtung Performing Arts Center		III/P	45	
2016	632	Kharkiv, Ukraine	Philharmonic building		IV/P	70	
