= St. Stephen's Church, Tangermünde =

Church in Tangermünde, Germany

Coordinates: 52°32′33″N 11°58′29″E

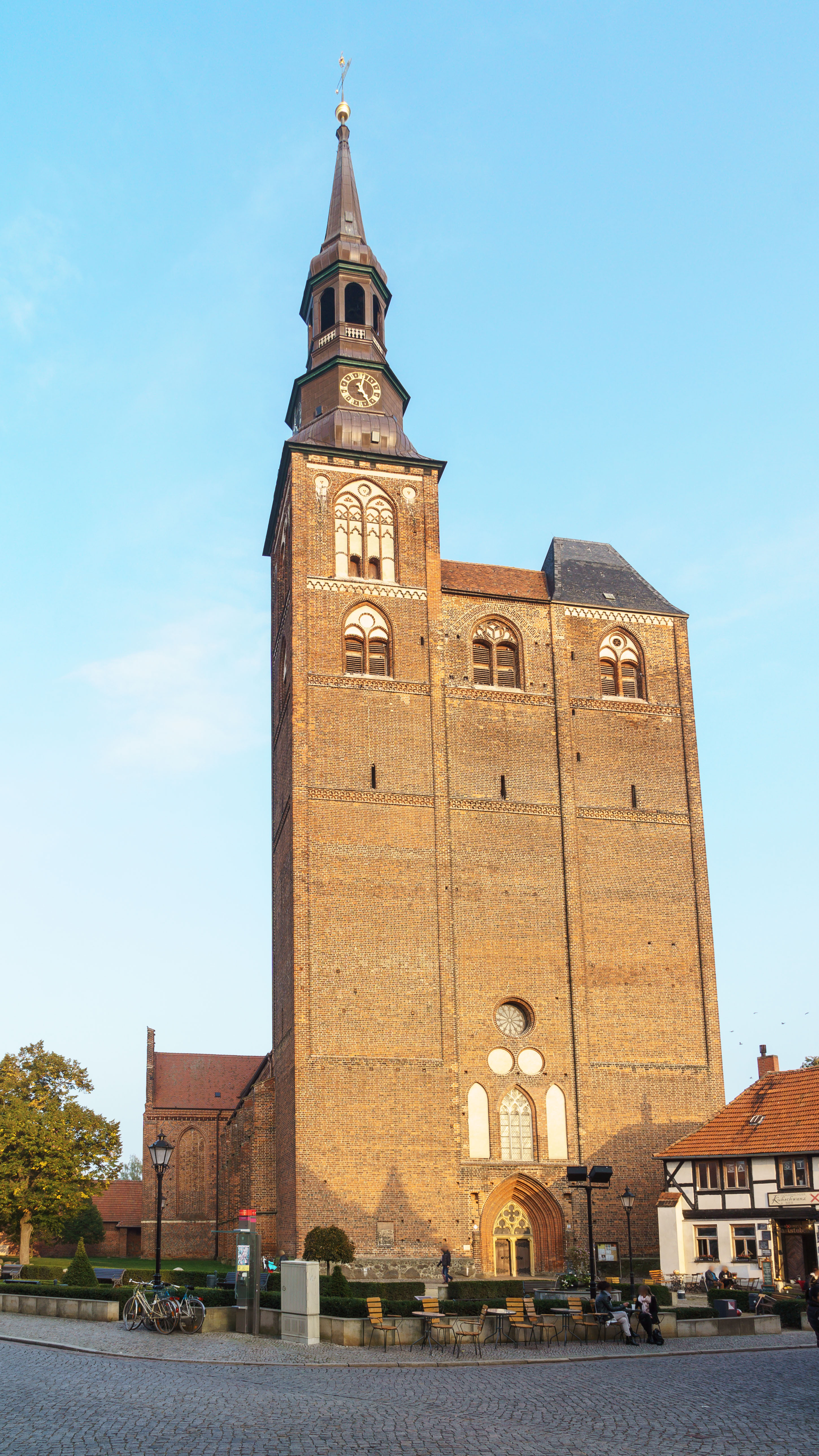
St Stephen's Church

St. Stephen's Church is a Lutheran church in Tangermünde, Saxony-Anhalt, constructed in the Brick Gothic style typical of North Germany.

== History ==
The predecessor of the present church was a Romanesque brick basilica with side aisles, a central nave, choir, main apse and side apses. It was in existence by 1188. Parts of this original building were reused in the construction of the present church. The transept of the former building gave the width of the new nave, on the north side of which two Romanesque windows are to be found together with part of the original stone walls of the previous building.

The construction of the existing building has been credited to Emperor Charles IV, who lived in Tangermünde between 1373 and 1378. Charles actually founded a house of Augustinian Canons, to which he gave the church as a source of income. The canons conducted the choral services and attended to the side altars. It is not now generally held that the Emperor commissioned the rebuilding of the church.

During the late Middle Ages the construction took place in several phases of today's triple-aisled Gothic hall church. Firstly, after 1350, the northern wall of the nave and the southern wall with alcoves were built, and in about 1405, the roof and the rib vaults. The prominent octagonal pillars are unusual. The south tower remains uncompleted to this day. In 1450 work began on the construction of the new choir, followed by the outside walls of the new ambulatory and also the arms of the transept. Only then was the old choir removed. The inside of the choir and the ambulatory are divided by compound piers consisting of massive circular columns each with four ancillary shafts, which support the prominent vaulting. The choir was roofed in 1475.

In 1617, a city-wide fire damaged the church building and the top part of the north tower collapsed. It was not restored until after 1714, when the tower received its present Baroque roof, the wooden structure of which was completely refurbished at the end of the 20th century. The fire of 1617 also caused destruction to the interior of the church: the galleries, pulpit, choir stalls and the organ had all to be restored, and the damaged altar was not replaced until 1705.

== Description ==
The largely original 17th-century furnishing of the church interior is noteworthy. The colourful late Gothic interior design has been reconstructed.

The stone pulpit dates from 1619. It has been attributed to the sculptor Christoph Dehne of Magdeburg and clearly shows the influence of both the late Renaissance and the Mannerist styles. It includes a figure of Moses as the pulpit bearer, holding the Tables of the Law, as well as three-dimensional sculptural figures of the apostles and reliefs depicting central Bible subjects.

In 1705, the main Baroque altarpiece was introduced; it is extremely large, and unique in its sheer size in the Altmark region. The three-storey wooden structure has doors for the Holy Communion procession. The main level shows Moses and John the Baptist standing to either side of a Crucifixion. Saint Peter and Saint Paul attend Christ, who is portrayed as the Lion of Judah.

The north side of the nave contains a wooden gallery, the railing of which contains 41 painted panels showing scenes from Genesis, the stories of the Patriarchs and the story of Joseph. Under these early Baroque paintings are the names and house marks of the benefactors.

The chapel in the north arm of the transept is dedicated to those who died during the two world wars. Opposite the chapel entrance is hung a painting of 1697 of "Christ before the High Council" on the back wall of the choir stalls. The bronze baptismal font dates from 1508.

=== Organ ===
The Baroque organ of 1624 by the brothers Hans and Fritz Scherer, which is still played, is especially noteworthy. Its design, consisting of a main organ, a Rückpositiv and bass pipes, is a clear example of the Scherers' construction technique known as the "Hamburg Prospekt". In 1994 it was restored by Alexander Schuke Potsdam Orgelbau. The organ, which had been altered several times in its history, was restored to its original acoustic pattern, which was possible as 50% of the original pipes were still in place. The instrument is tuned in a meantone temperament.

=== Bells ===
The bells made by Herman Grosse in 1869 were originally a set of four. The smallest one, weighing 1,083 lbs, was destroyed during World War I. In 1949, when the bells were re-hung after World War II, they were replaced in their original wooden yokes. In 1961, the bells were attached to an offset steel yoke. During an extensive refurbishment in 2010, the bells were turned 90 degrees into their original position. Straight yokes and new clappers were also incorporated. The biggest bell has been placed at the central part of the building in a valuable bell frame of 1767. The two smaller ones, weighing 4,460 lbs. and 2,880 lbs respectively, each of them in its respective bell frame, have been hung in the north and south towers. Since the year 2000 the hourly chimes have been sounded by a cup-shaped bell located in the open bell tower.

== Literature ==
- Dehio-Handbuch der deutschen Kunstdenkmäler, Sachsen-Anhalt I, Regierungsbezirk Magdeburg. Deutscher Kunstverlag, München / Berlin 2002, ISBN 3-422-03069-7, Seite 923 ff.
- Peter Findeisen: Die Stephanskirche zu Tangermünde. Schnell und Steiner, München / Zürich 1991. (ohne ISBN)
- Martina Gaß: Kleiner Führer durch die Sankt-Stephans-Kirche Tangermünde. Selbstverlag Förderverein St. Stephanskirche Tangermünde e.V., o. J.
