= Adolf Reubke =

German organ builder (1805–1875)

Adolf Reubke (December 6, 1805 – March 3, 1875) was a German organ builder.

Reubke was born in Halberstadt, the son of domain collector Georg Benjamin. His family moved to Hausneindorf in 1809, and Reubke began taking piano lessons. To pursue a professional career, he was sent to the Cathedral Gymnasium school, but left early after his father died. He later became an apprentice of a woodturner, but after some conflicts with his mentor, left the apprenticeship and continued woodturning at his family home.

Reubke's interest in music remained, and he taught himself to build instruments, building his first organ in 1837. He eventually started an organ-building business based in Hausneindorf. From 1853 to 1858, the company built an organ with 53 voices for the Jakobikirche in Magdeburg, and from 1856 to 1861, it built the organ at Magdeburg Cathedral. In 1860, it built the organ for the Gewandhaus in Leipzig, the home of the Leipzig Gewandhaus Orchestra.

Reubke married Elise Weiderhold, and the two had three sons: Friedrich Julius, born in 1834; Carl Ludwig Emil, born in 1836; and Otto, born in 1842. All three of his sons became musicians. In particular, Julius Reubke became a noted composer and pupil of Franz Liszt before his early death in 1858.

From 1860, Adolf ran his business, now called Reubke & Sohn, with his son Emil. Emil continued to run the business after Adolf died, until his own death in 1884. Ernst Röver took over and, in turn, ran the business until his death.

Reubke died in 1875 in Hausneindorf.
