= Hans-Joachim Schuke =

German organ builder (1908–1979)

Hans-Joachim Schuke (7 January 1908 – 20 July 1979) was a German organ builder. He was the son of the organ builder Alexander Schuke and ran his father's company, the "Alexander Schuke Orgelbauanstalt Potsdam", today the Alexander Schuke Potsdam Orgelbau company, weiter.

== Life ==
Born in Potsdam, Schuke attended the Viktoria-Gymnasium Potsdam, today Helmholtz-Gymnasium Potsdam, until 1923. He left school early to complete a commercial apprenticeship in Görlitz. When he returned to Potsdam after this training, he learned the organ building trade in his father's company "Alexander Schuke Orgelbauanstalt Potsdam". He worked there as an organ builder until 1933. In that year, his father Alexander Schuke died.

In the following years, Hans-Joachim and his brother Karl Schuke continued the business together. In 1940, Hans-Joachim Schuke was drafted into the German Wehrmacht. From 1940 to 1945 he was stationed in France and Italy as an accountant. In 1945, he was transferred to the front in Berlin. He became a Soviet prisoner of war at the Battle of Halbe and was taken to a prison camp in Ryazan, about 200 km southeast of Moscow. He was there for three years, until 8 May 1948.

When he returned to Potsdam, he continued the work in the organ building company. Due to the political situation in the post-war years, it seemed advisable to Hans-Joachim and Karl Schuke to set up another company location in the western part of Berlin if it was no longer possible to continue in Potsdam. Although the situation stabilised and the continuation in Potsdam was assured, Karl Schuke continued to run the Berlin location alone from 1953 onwards, while Hans-Joachim Schuke continued to run the headquarters in Potsdam. He was able to run this as a purely private company from 1953 to 1972. In 1972, the company was forcibly nationalised and from then on was called "VEB Potsdamer Schuke Orgelbau". Schuke remained works director until 1976, but was an employee of the district economic council in Potsdam. In 1976, he suffered a stroke and was unable to continue working in the company. From 1976 to 1990, the management of the "VEB Potsdamer Schuke Orgelbau" was in the hands of Max Thiel, whom he had known since his war captivity in the Soviet Union. On 20 July 1979, Hans-Joachim Schuke died in Potsdam at the age of 71 and was buried in Potsdam's main cemetery.

Matthias Schuke, second son of Hans-Joachim Schuke, learned the organ building trade from 1974 to 1977 and completed his master craftsman training from 1985 to 1988. In the course of the political and economic changes, Schuke successfully reprivatised the company and became the owner and managing director of the Alexander Schuke Potsdam Orgelbau company.
