= Dutch Quarter =

Neighborhood of Potsdam, Germany

Coordinates: 52°24′10″N 13°03′40″E

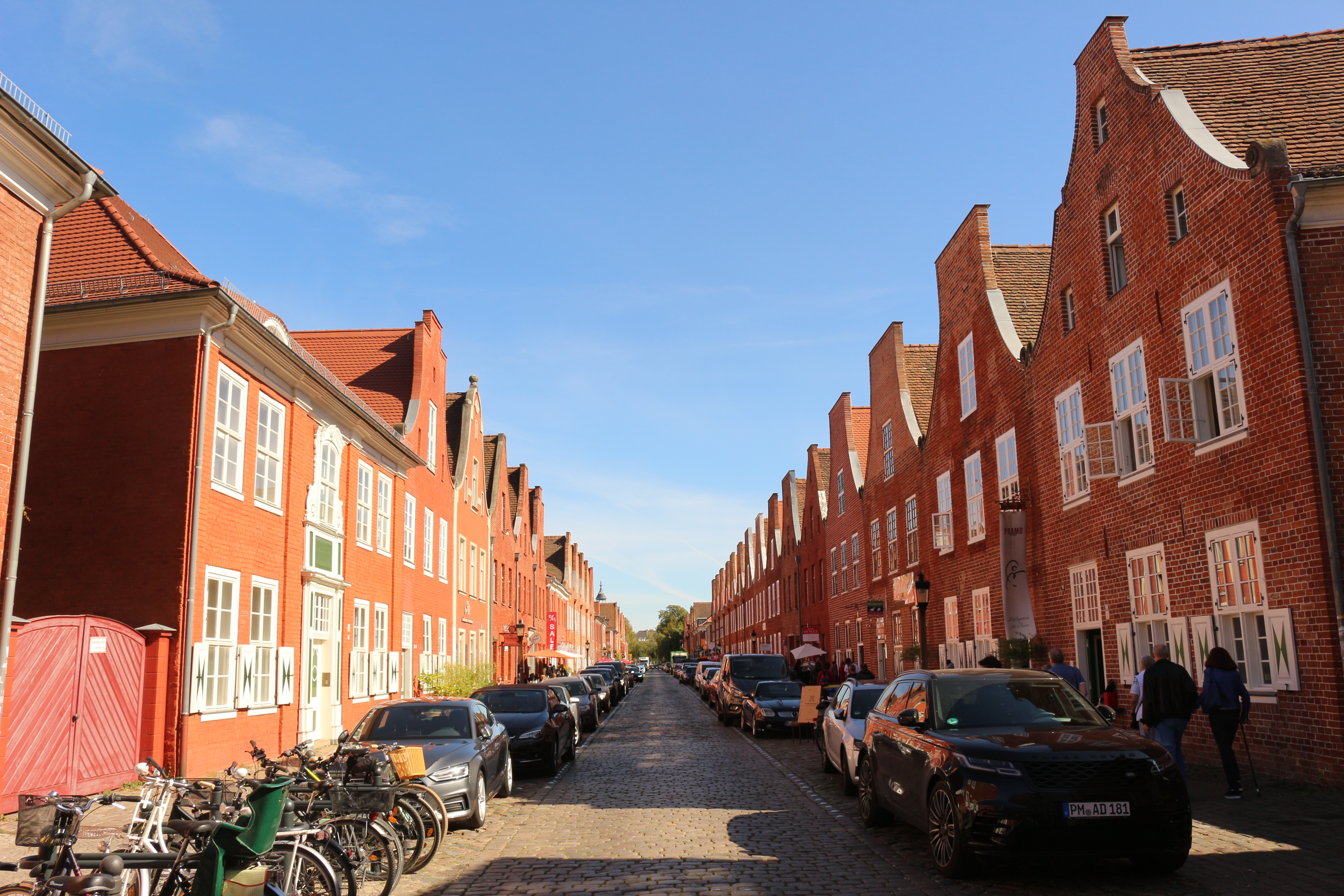
The Dutch Quarter of Potsdam - buildings of the 1730s

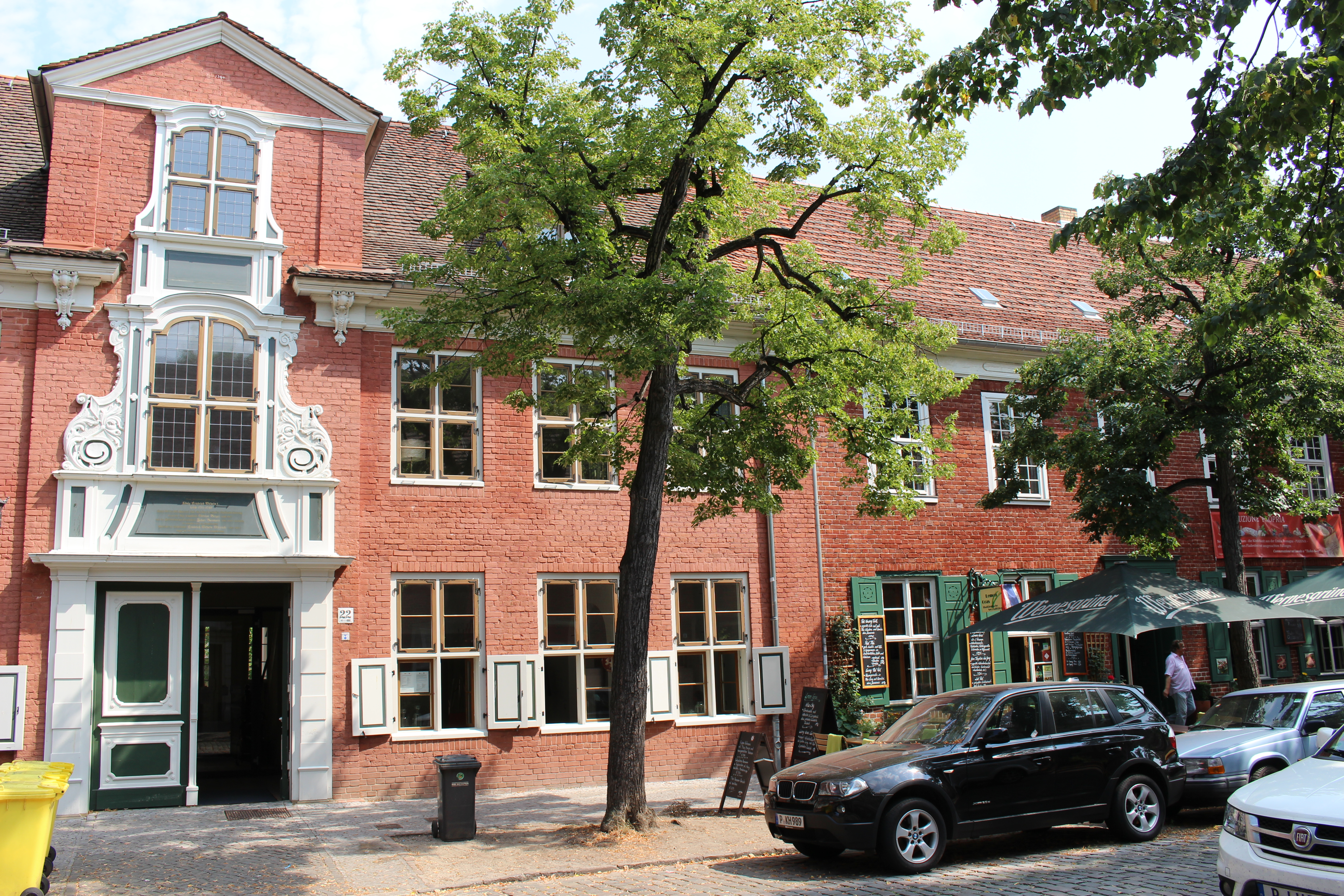
Facade in the Dutch Quarter

The Dutch Quarter (German: Holländisches Viertel) is a neighborhood in Potsdam, Germany, consisting of 134 red Dutch brick buildings, almost all of which have been renovated.

It was built from 1733 to 1740 and designed by Jan Bouman following the order of Frederick William I of Prussia, who invited talented Dutch craftsmen to settle there. Under him, known as the "soldier king", the district was planned and the two western squares were built. After his death in 1740, his son and successor Frederick the Great had the quarter with the two eastern squares completed largely according to his father's plans.
