= Karl Schuke =

German organ builder (1906–1987)

- Karl Schuke, in c. 1981
- Born: Karl Ludwig Alexander Schuke; 6 November 1906; Potsdam, German Empire
- Died: 7 May 1987 (aged 80); Berlin, Germany
- Occupations: Organ builder; Academic teacher
- Organizations: Karl Schuke Berliner Orgelbauwerkstatt; Musikhochschule Berlin; Bund deutscher Orgelbaumeister
- Parent: Alexander Schuke

Karl Ludwig Alexander Schuke (6 November 1906 – 7 May 1987) was a German organ builder. The son of the organ builder Alexander Schuke, he continued, together with his brother Hans-Joachim Schuke, to run their father's company in Potsdam until 1953, when he founded another organ building company, the Karl Schuke Berliner Orgelbauwerkstatt in West Berlin. They have built organs internationally in Korea, Australia and the U.S.

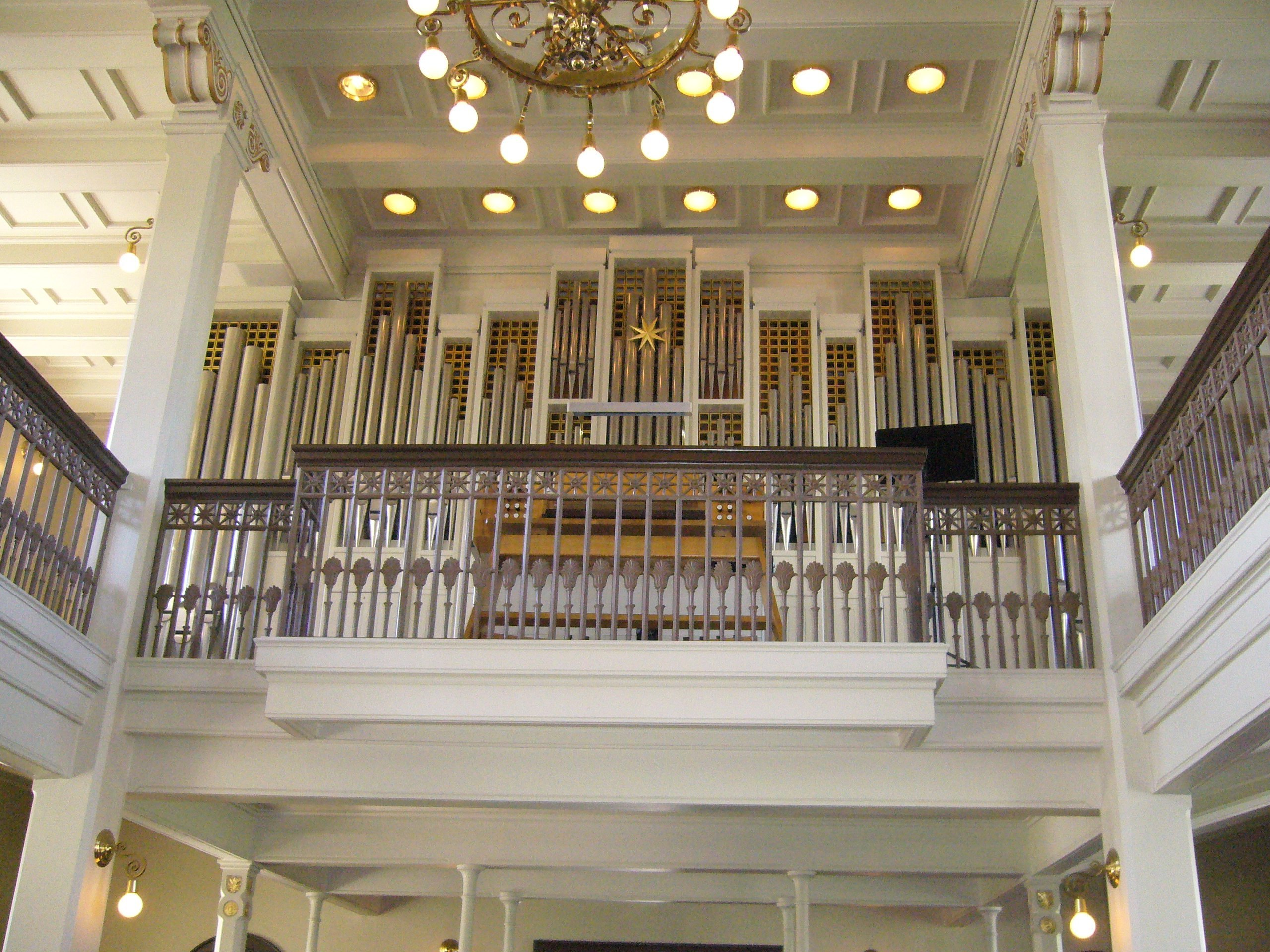
Organ by Karl Schuke in the Reykjavík Cathedral

== Life ==
Born in Potsdam, the son of the organ builder Alexander Schuke, he attended school from 1912 to 1922 and graduated with Obersekundareife from the humanistic Viktoria-Gymnasium in Potsdam. He then began an apprenticeship as an organ builder in his father's workshop. From 1924, he received special training in metal pipe making. He established a workshop for pipe making, including training of workers. From 1927, he constructed pneumatic and electric action and windchest systems.

When their father died in 1933, Karl and his brother Hans-Joachim continued to run the business together. Karl was responsible for technical issues, while Hans-Joachim was responsible for commercial aspects. They built an organ for the Ernst-Moritz-Arndt-Kirche in Berlin-Zehlendorf in 1935, which is still preserved. Despite war-related restrictions after 1939, the business continued to exist exclusively through organ building and repairs.

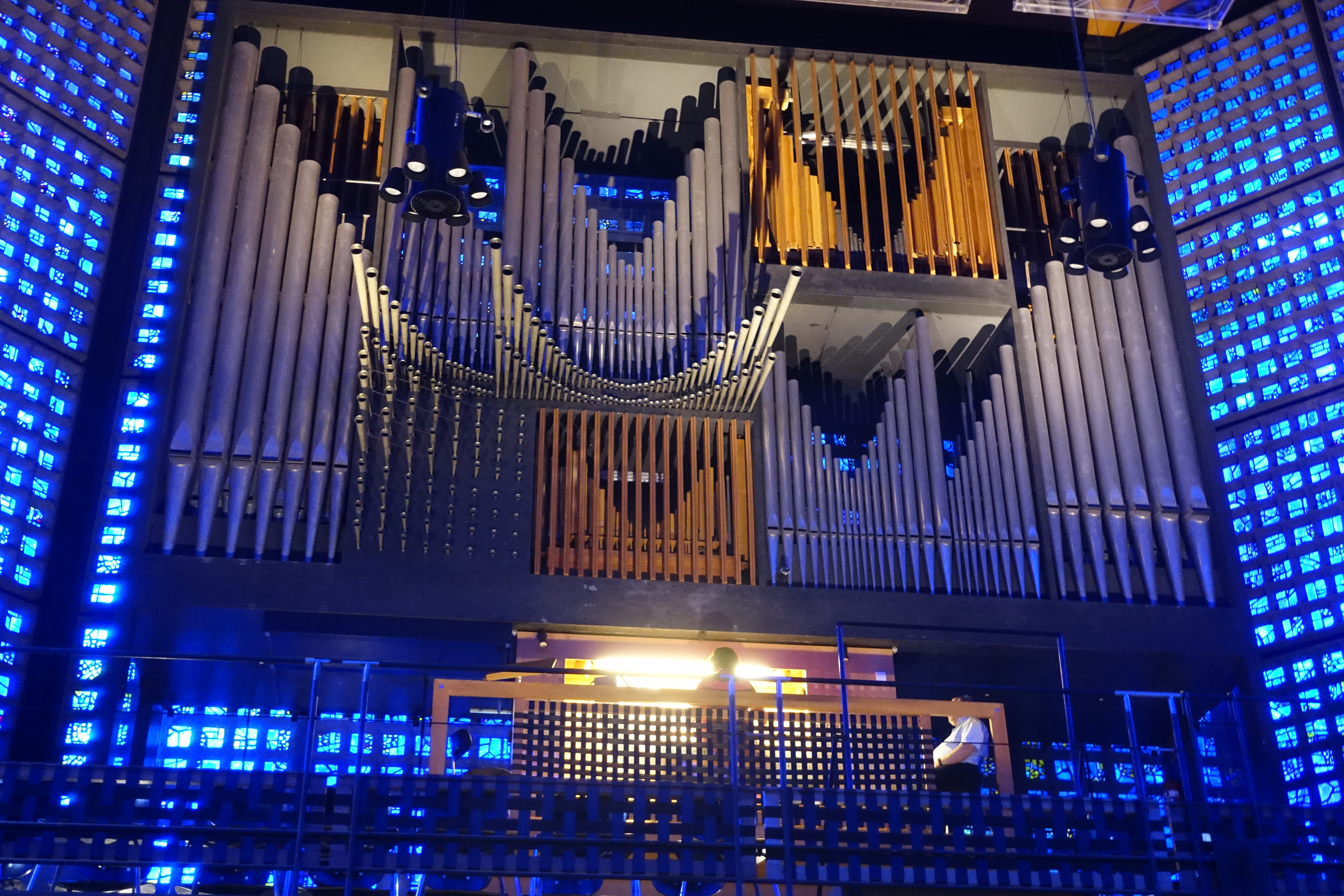
Organ in the Gedächtniskirche

Hans-Joachim Schuke returned from Soviet captivity in 1948. Potsdam belonged to the East German zone. In 1950, the Karl Schuke Berliner Orgelbauwerkstatt (Karl Schuke Berlin organ building workshop) was founded as a branch in West Berlin. In 1953, Schuke moved to Berlin and began to build up the workshop in Berlin-Lichterfelde, while his brother kept running the Potsdam workshop which he named Alexander Schuke Potsdam Orgelbau in 1990. Karl Schuke's company built the organ for the new Kaiser Wilhelm Memorial Church in 1962–63. They built the main organ of the Berliner Philharmonie in 1965, and renovated it in 1992, 2012 and 2016.

In 1966, the workshop was moved to Berlin-Zehlendorf. Schuke retired in 1976, succeeded by Wolfgang Theer. The company built a new instrument for the Sejong Center in Seoul in 1978.

In 1955, Schuke received a teaching assignment for organ studies at the Musikhochschule Berlin in Berlin, and in 1956 he was appointed to the state examination board for church musicians. In 1962, he was appointed professor at the Musikhochschule, and from 1966, he was honorary professor. In 1967, he was elected to the board of directors of the "Bund deutscher Orgelbaumeister", an association of German organ builders.

Schuke died in Berlin in 1987 at the age of 80. His grave is located at the Waldfriedhof Zehlendorf.

== Awards ==
- 1972: Order of Merit of the Federal Republic of Germany
