= Alexander Schuke =

German organ builder (1879–1933)

Alexander Schuke, c. 1930

Carl Alexander Schuke (14 August 1870 – 16 November 1933) was a German organ builder and from 1894 to 1933 owner and manager of the a company which was named after him Alexander Schuke Potsdam Orgelbau in 1990.

== Life ==
Born in Stepenitz Landkreis Ostprignitz, Kingdom of Prussia, Schuke was the son of the pastor Karl Schuke, who officiated in Stepenitz from 1867 to 1886, and Charlotte Margarethe Alexandrine Anna von Wulffen. In 1885, he came to Potsdam and attended the Viktoria-Gymnasium, today Helmholtz-Gymnasium Potsdam. After graduating from high school, he learned the organ building trade from master organ builder Carl Eduard Gesell. After Gesell's death in 1894, Schuke bought the company and thus took over the business. Through his temporary work at the organ building company Sauer from Frankfurt (Oder), he was able to gain experience in contemporary modern organ building techniques, which he brought into his company and thus made his workshop one of the best known organ building companies.

After his death in Potsdam at the age of 63, his sons Karl Schuke and Hans-Joachim Schuke continued to run the company together. Approximately 140 organs were built during Alexander Schuke's tenure. For example, Schuke built the organ at the Dorfkirche Ketzür.
