= Carl August Buchholz =

German organ builder (1796–1884)

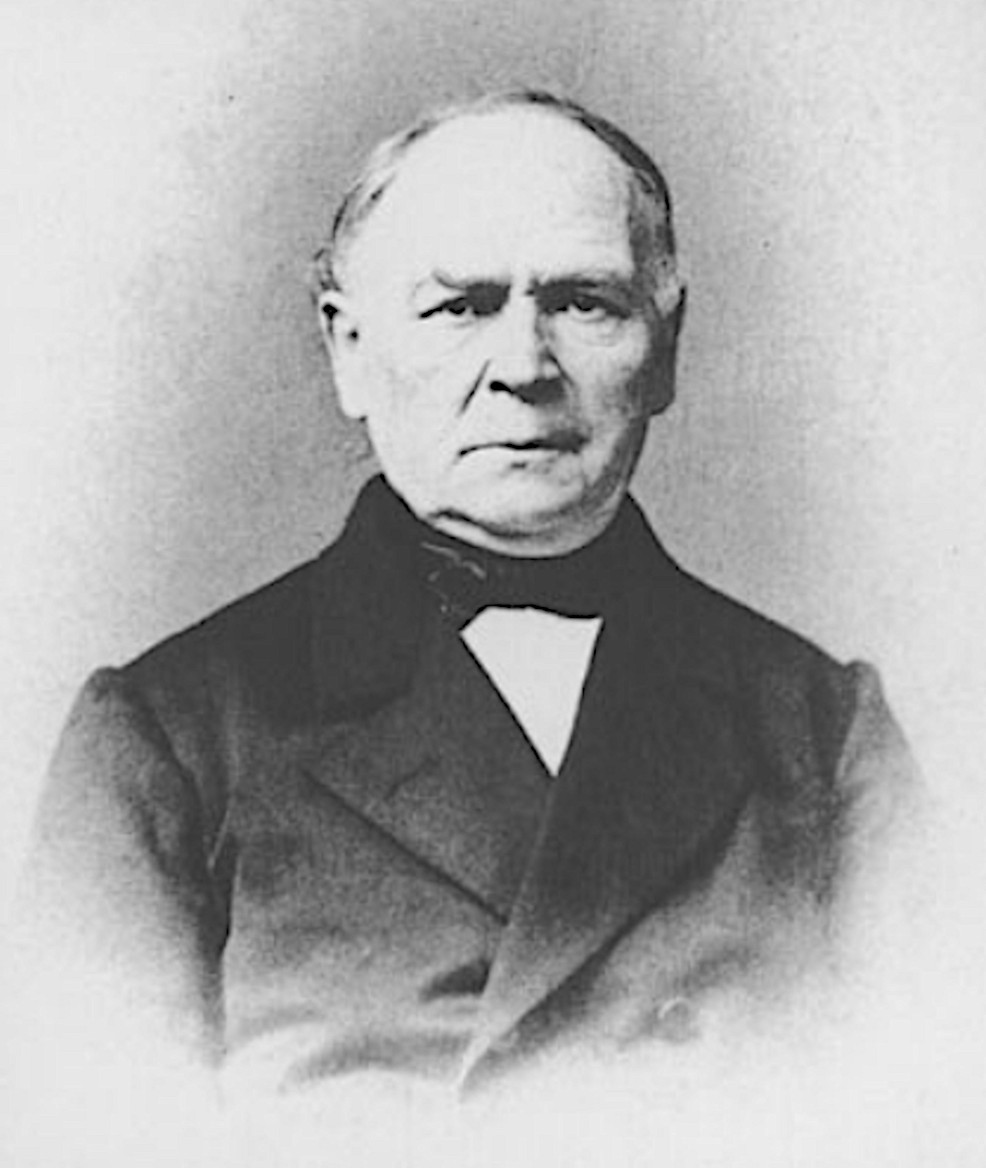
Carl August Buchholz (Orgelbauer) (1796–1884)

Carl August Buchholz (13 August 1796 – 7 August 1884) was a German organ builder.

== Life ==
Born in Berlin, Buchholz learned the organ builder's trade from his father Johann Simon Buchholz. He built his own first new organ in 1817 for the Prenzlau Sabinenkirche. From 1821 onwards, he was in charge of building organs with his father. The workshop was located in Kleine Hamburger Straße/corner of Auguststraße in Berlin-Mitte. His father gave him the opportunity to try out technical innovations in organ building.

Buchholz had been married to Christiane Wilhelmine Kunsemüller, the daughter of a doctor from Wittstock, since 9 September 1820. His son Carl Friedrich Buchholz (7 July 1821 in Berlin – 17 February 1885 idem) first learned from his father and worked as a journeyman for Aristide Cavaillé-Coll in Paris around 1847/48. From 1848, he worked again for his father.

Buchholz was appointed "Academic Artist" in 1853 by the Academy of Arts (or the Prussian government ?).

After his death in 1884, his son Carl Friedrich Buchholz continued to run the workshop for a short time and died himself about six months later.

== Organ building ==
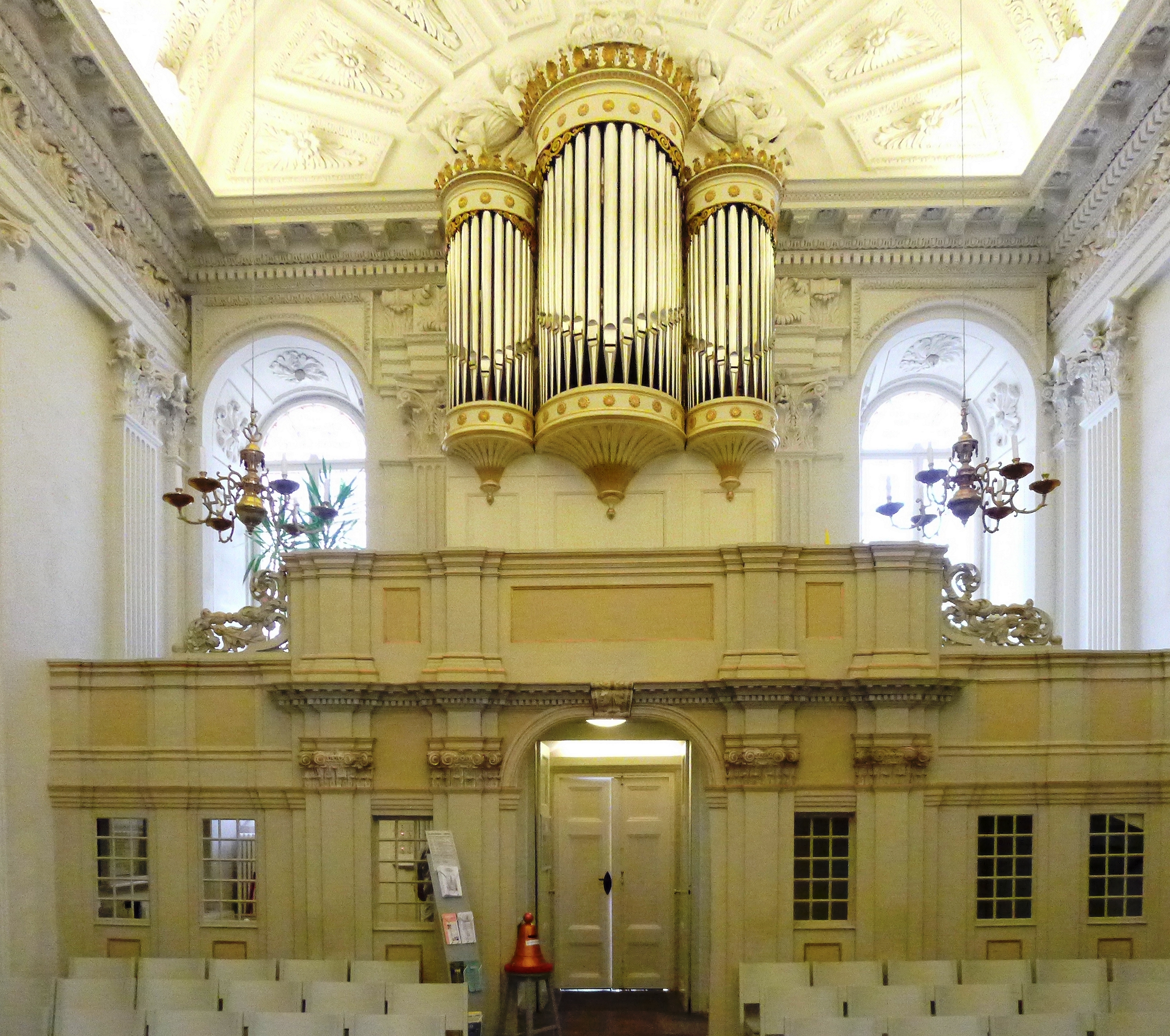
Castle Church (Berlin-Köpenick) Organ Gallery

Buchholz built exclusively mechanical organs with slider chests. Characteristic of his construction method were wedge-shaped cut sliders, which were pressed into wedge-shaped slider bands. This made it possible to compensate for changes in the wood caused by climatic conditions, for example in humid regions. Buchholz also introduced barque valves and swells as an innovation. The action was made with waveboards, modelled on those of Joachim Wagner and Ernst Julius Marx. Some of the smaller organs were built with side-playing wave frames.

Buchholz usually had architects such as Karl Friedrich Schinkel design the fronts for larger organs. For smaller instruments, he designed the models himself. The facade design shows an astonishing variety. Buchholz collaborated with organists such as August Wilhelm Bach and Carl August Haupt in the design of the stoplist. In some of the larger organs, there are striking similarities between the dispositions in the main and Oberwerk and Joachim Wagner's organ in Berlin's Marienkirche, which Buchholz had restored in 1829.

Buchhol is considered the most important organ builder in the Mark Brandenburg in his time. His method of construction was characterised by the highest precision in craftsmanship. Buchholz was very modest and largely refrained from excessive self-promotion.

== Students ==
Buchholz influenced a number of young organ builders who went on to work independently in various regions.

- Carl Friedrich Buchholz, his son
- Moritz Baumgarten, afterwards organ builder in Zahna
- Wilhelm Bergen, afterwards organ builder in Halberstadt
- Ferdinand Dinse, afterwards organ builder in Berlin
- Friedrich Friese III, afterwards important organ builder in Schwerin, Mecklenburg
- Barnim Grüneberg, his nephew, afterwards important organ builder in Stettin, Pomerania
- Ernst Hildebrand
- Johannes Kewitsch, from Berlin
- Friedrich Kienscherf, afterwards organ builder in Eberswalde
- Wilhelm Lang, afterwards organ builder in Berlin
- Ferdinand Lange, afterwards instrument maker in Berlin
- Friedrich Hermann Lütkemüller, afterwards important organ builder in Wittstock, Prignitz
- Wilhelm Meywald, afterwards organ builder in Transylvania
- Johann Rohn, afterwards organ builder in Wormditt, East Prussia
- Carl Schneider, afterwards organ builder in Kronstadt, Transylvania
- Christian Friedrich Voelkner, afterwards organ builder in Dünnow, Hinterpommern

== Work ==
Buchholz built a total of 140 new organs between 1817 and his death in 1884. In addition, there were 20 rebuilds and restorations. All of Buchholz's organs have purely mechanical slider chests with the wedge loops he invented.

Among Buchholz's most important works is the organ built in 1839 in the Transylvanian Kronstadt in the Protestant Biserica Neagră: with 63 stops on four manuals, the Buchholz Organ of the Black Church is the largest instrument built by Buchholz and still survives today.

In 1821, he still completed the organ in the Barther Marienkirche together with his father. This organ was almost revolutionary for its time, with a 42-voice disposition distributed over two manuals and pedal and a manual range up to the three-stroke G. It is today the Buchholz organ. Today it is the Buchholz organ with the largest original inventory in Germany. The early romantic organ is of European significance.

The largest Buchholz organ in Germany is in the Nikolaikirche (see Organ of the St. Nikolaikirche) and dates from 1841.

== List of realisations ==
=== New buildings ===
The size of the instruments is indicated in the fifth column by the number of manuals and the number of sounding stops in the sixth column. A capital "P" stands for an independent pedal, a small "p" for an attached pedal. The last column contains information on the original and present condition. Italicisation indicates that the organ in question is no longer preserved or that only the casing is preserved.

==== With Johann Simon Buchholz ====
Buchholz built the organs listed below between 1812 and 1825 together with his father Johann Simon.

Year	Location	Building	Picture	Manual	Casing	Notes
1812	Altentreptow	St. Petri		II/P	23	Parts and stops integrated into an organ built in 1865 by Barnim Grüneberg, restored in 2002/2003 by the organ building and restoration workshop Scheffler; today II/P/31
1817	Berlin	Oberpfarr- und Domkirche		II/P	32	Extension by Gebr. Dinse (Berlin) in 1886, dismantled in 1893; cathedral replaced by new building with new organ in 1905
1817	Neulietzegöricke	Ev. Kirche		I	2	Not preserved
1817	Neu Hardenberg	Ev. Kirche		II/P	21	The housing designed by Schinkel in 1817 has been preserved, with a new building by W. Sauer in 1924. (Opus 1284).
1818	Demmin	St. Bartholomaei	II/P	40	Restored in 1999/2000 by the organ building and restoration workshop Scheffler (Sieversdorf) → Organ of St Bartholomaei Church	
1819	Ahrensfelde	Ev. Kirche		I	5	Not preserved
1820	Baruth/Mark	Stadtpfarrkirche St. Sebastian		II/P	21	Not preserved
1820	Britz bei Eberswalde	Ev. Dorfkirche		I/P	7	Preserved
1820	Gristow	Kirche Gristow		I/P	13	Extended in the 19th century by Barnim Grüneberg; preserved
1821	Berlin-Schöneberg	Dorfkirche Schöneberg		I/P	11	The instrument was destroyed on 26 February 1945 when the church burned down.
1821	Barth	St. Marien	II/P	42	Restored by the Orgelwerkstatt Wegscheider (Dresden) → Orgel der Marienkirche	
1821	Greifswald	St. Jakobi		II/P	28	Instrument destroyed in a tower fire in 1955
1822	Wachow	Ev. Kirche		I/P	14	In 1911, repair and alteration of the disposition by A. Schuke, original substance largely preserved.
1822	Berlin	Royal Music Institute of Berlin		II/P	13	Built in 1888
1823	Rixdorf	Bethlehemskirche		I/P	13	In the Dorfkirche Alt Gaarz since 1895
1823	Seelübbe	Ev. Kirche		II/P		Replaced in the 2nd half of the 19th century by a work by Albert Kienscherf (Eberswalde)
1823	Teltow	St. Andreas		I/P	17	Destroyed
1824	Stargard	St. Marien		III/P	32	Not preserved
1825	Osterburg	St. Nikolai		II/P	22	Several times converted.

==== Own new buildings ====
From 1817 to 1847 he built alone the following organs.

Year	Location	Building	Picture	Manual	Casing	Notes						
1817	Prenzlau	Sabinenkirche				First independent organ building by C. A. Buchholz in his father's workshop; destroyed						
1824	Görzke	Ev. Kirche		I/P	14	Expansion with a second manual by Friedrich Lobbes in 1882; preserved						
1826	Berlin-Britz	Dorfkirche Britz		I/P	9	Replaced in 1888 by a new building by Gebr. Dinse/Berlin (II+P/10), in which parts (wooden pipes) from 1826 are preserved. → Orgel						
1826	Rolofshagen	Ev. Dorfkirche		I/P	7	Extended in the 19th century by Mehmel; destroyed: in 1986 the village church collapsed due to lack of roof renovation.						
1827	Berlin-Kaulsdorf	Jesus Church		I/P		Replaced in 1912 by a new building by Gebr. Dinse (Berlin)						
1829	Pütte	Ev. Dorfkirche	II/P	14	Restored in 2014 by the Historical Keyboard Instruments Schmidt company (Rostock)							
1829	Stralsund	Heilgeistkirche	II/P	17	Extension reconstruction by Schuke in 1969; Front and 8 stops preserved							
1830	Grimmen	St. Marien		II/P	26	New construction by Mitteldeutscher Orgelbau A. Voigt in 1992; casing preserved						
1830	Merz	Ev. Kirche		I	5	Extension around 1875 by Wilhelm Remler; preserved						
1829–1831	Berlin-Mitte	Friedrichswerdersche Kirche		III/P	33	New construction by Gebr. Dinse (Berlin) in 1891 using old pipes and the casing, destroyed in 1944/1945						
1831	Gützkow	St. Nikolai		II/P	14	Extended by W. Sauer (Frankfurt/Oder)						
1831	Tribsees	St.-Thomas-Kirche	II/P	24	Restoration in 1996 by Orgelbau- und Restaurierungswerkstatt Rainer Wolter							
1832	Greifswald	Dom St. Nikolai	III/P	44	Rebuilt in 1988 by Jehmlich Orgelbau Dresden → Orgel							
1832	Lassan	St. Johannis		II/P	17	General overhaul in 1986 by Orgelbau- und Restaurierungswerkstatt Rainer Wolter (Dresden)						
1833	Falkenrehde	Ev. Kirche		I	5	New building in 1911 by Alexander Schuke						
1833	Soest	Reformed Brunsteinkapelle		II/P	10	Transferred to Alt-St. Thomä in 1873, replaced there in 1913						
1834	Berlin-Mitte	St. Elisabeth		II/P	18	Destroyed in 1945						
1834	Berlin-Mitte	Heilig-Geist-Kapelle		I/P	10	Dismantling in 1906, whereabouts unknown						
1834	Berlin-Moabit	St. Johannis		II/P	11	Not preserved						
1834	Berlin-Wedding	Nazarethkirche		II/P	11	Replaced with new building by Walcker in 1896						
1834	Berlin-Gesundbrunnen	St. Paul		II/P	11	Replaced by new building by Walcker in 1906						
1834	Frankfurt (Oder)	St. Marien		III/P	54	Art treasures were removed during the Second World War; organ destroyed						
1835	Liebenwalde	Ev. Kirche		II/P	20	Replaced by new building by Hollenbach in 1898						
1836	Altfriedland	Klosterkirche Altfriedland		I		Damaged in 1945, replaced in 1954						
1836	Elsey	Ev. Collegiate Church Elsey Abbey			Organ renovations 1953/1969/1994; not preserved							
1836	Garz/Rügen	St. Petri	II/P	12	Reconstruction in 1914 by Barnim Grüneberg; restoration in 1995 by Orgelbau- und Restaurierungswerkstatt Rainer Wolter.							
1838	Wolgast	St. Petri		II/P	12	Since 2000 in Falkenhagen (Mark), restored by Christian Scheffler						
1838	Wotenick	St. Nikolai		I/P	8	Extension in 1874 by Friedrich Albert Mehmel (Stralsund), 2008 overhaul by the Mecklenburger Orgelbau company						
1839	Hanshagen	Kirche Hanshagen		I/P	8	In 1860 Friedrich Albert Mehmel added a second manual and in 1954 Barnim Grüneberg jr. from Greifswald redesigned the sound, from the 1980s unplayable, in 2010 S. Müller provisionally made some stops playable again, 2017/2018 repaired by the firm Historische Tasteninstrumente Schmidt (Rostock).						
1839	Kronstadt, Siebenbürgen, heute Brașov	Schwarze Kirche	IV/PBrașov)	63	Restoration in 2001 by organ builder Stemmer (Zumikon/CH); largely preserved → Organs of the Black Church (Brașov)							
1839	Stoltenhagen	Ev. Kirche		I/P	9	2001/2005 Part restoration by Orgelbau- und Restaurierungswerkstatt Rainer Wolter						
1839/1840	Berlin-Mitte	Workhouse Church				Destroyed						
1840	Altreetz	Ev. Kirche		II/P	18	largely preserved.						
1840	Leplow	St. Katharinen		I/P	8	Rebuilt in 1971 by Groß Bünzow, restored in 2010/2011 by Orgelwerkstatt Scheffler						
1840	Neuruppin	St. Marien		III/P	40	Gehäuse erhalten						
1840	Tempelfelde	Ev. Kirche		II/P	10	with physharmonica in the upper work, church destroyed by fire in 1885.						
1841	Schlemmin	Ev. Dorfkirche		I/P	8	Prospektpfeifen wurden 1917 für Kriegszwecke abgegeben, 2001–2002 restauriert durch Fa. Martin-Christian Schmidt						
1841	Stralsund	St. Nikolai	III/P	56	→ Orgel der St.-Nikolai-Kirche							
1842	Abtshagen	Heilgeistkirche		I/P	8	2001 restored by Orgelbau- und Restaurierungswerkstatt Rainer Wolter (Dresden)						
1842	Bobbin	St. Pauli	I/p	4	1881 Umbau und Erweiterung auf I/P/6 durch Barnim Grüneberg; 2007 Restaurierung und Prospekteinbau durch Orgelbau- und Restaurierungswerkstatt Rainer Wolter; Wiedereinweihung am 31. August 2008							
1842	Stralsund	St. Annen und Brigitten		I	4	Not preserved						
1842	Wrechow, Neumark, today Orzechów	Ev. Kirche		I/P	10	probably in poor condition or no longer preserved.						
1842	Wusterhusen	Johanneskirche		II/P	15	Expansion by Heintze in 1923						
1844	Berlin-Mitte	Klosterkirche		II/P	25	Destroyed in April 1945						
1844	Koblenz-Stolzenfels	St. Menas		I		Replaced by a Klais organ in 1942						
1844	Velgast	Ev. Christuskirche		I/P	8	Restoration in 1995 by Orgelbau- und Restaurierungswerkstatt Rainer Wolter						
1845	Tribohm	Ev. Dorfkirche		I/P	7	In 1917 the front pipes had to be given away for war purposes. Restored in 1994 by Hinrich Otto Paschen (Kiel) in accordance with the preservation order.	1845	Altmädewitz	Ev. Kirche	I/P	11	Built by Lang & Dinse gebaut
1845	Pelplin	Domkirche		III/P	55	Extension by Bruno Goebel; preserved → Orgeln der Kathedrale Pelplin						
1846	Berlin-Köpenick	Schlosskirche		I/P		Casing preserved, new construction in 1987 by A. Voigt (Bad Liebenwerda)						
1846	Berlin-Lichtenberg	Alte Pfarrkirche		I/P	7	Replaced in 1887 by new construction by W. Sauer (Frankfurt/Oder), destroyed around 1944						
1846	Berlin-Mitte	St. Nikolai		III/P	50	New construction in 1902 by W. Sauer using the casing and old material; destroyed in 1944						
1846	Berlin-Wilmersdorf	Ev. Dorfkirche		I/P		Dismantled in 1898 in the course of the new church building						
1846	Britz bnear Eberswalde	Dorfkirche		I/P	7	Restoration in 2017 by Schuke.						
1846	Bönen	Alte Kirche				Not preserved						
1846	Stralsund-Voigdehagen	Kirche Voigdehagen		II/P	15	General overhaul/partial restoration in 2003/2006 by Orgelbau- und Restaurierungswerkstatt Rainer Wolter (Dresden), restoration by Scheffler (Sieversdorf) in 2020.						
1846/47	Berlin-Mitte	Deutscher Dom		II/P	24	1882 Abbau, Teile nach Ueckermünde für die Stadtkirche verkauft						
1847	Berlin-Mitte	Gertraudenkirche				1881 Abbau (Kirche wurde abgerissen)						
1847	Prenzlau	St. Marien		II/P	33	Destroyed in 1945						
1847	Schmölln	Ev. Kirche		I/P	10	1897 Umsetzung nach Schenkenberg (Kreis Prenzlau), dort 1900 verbrannt						
1848	Berlin	Private Synagoge		II/P	9	Not preserved						
1848	Berlin-Kreuzberg	Irvingianerkirche				Preserved ??						
1848	Berlin-Mitte	St. Georgen		III/P	42	Not preserved						
1848	Oranienburg	Evangelisches Seminar				Preserved ??						
1848	Damgarten	St. Bartholomäus		II/P	13	Replaced in 1971 by W. Sauer						
1848	Görlsdorf, Uckermark	Evangelische Kirche		I/p	4	es fehlen viele Pfeifen						
1848	Lüdershagen	St. Georg		I/P	9	Preserved						
1848	Röpersdorf, Uckermark	Evangelische Kirche		I/P	9	restauriert 2001; → Orgel						
1848	Soldin, Neumark, heute Myślibórz	Französisch-Reformierte Kirche		II/P	12	1925 Umsetzung nach Wolgast; 2001 Restaurierung und Aufstellung in Falkenhagen bei Freienwalde.						
1849	Blindow, Uckermark	Evangelische Kirche		II/P	11	1911 durch Barnim Grüneberg teilweise ersetzt, einige Register und Gehäuse erhalten						
1849	Boitzenburg, Uckermark	Pfarrkirche St. Marien auf dem Berge		II/P	14	Completed in 1850 by Carl Friedrich Buchholz.						

==== With Carl Friedrich Buchholz as assistant ====
From 1850, the son Carl Friedrich Buchholz was named a few times as an assistant.

Year	Location	Building	Picture	Manual	Casing	Notes
1850	Alt Lietzow, today Berlin-Charlottenburg	Dorfkirche				Not preserved
1850	Berlin-Mitte	Invalidenhaus, Evangelische Kapelle		I/P	9	Not preserved
1850	Berlin-Mitte	Invalidenhaus Berlin, katholische Kapelle				Probably not preserved
1850	Potsdam	Kadettenhaus		I/P	10	wahrscheinlich nicht erhalten
1850	Grieben	Dorfkirche		II/P	9	probably preserved.
1851	Falkenwalde	Village church		I/P	14	Preserved. Marx-Orgel
1850	Soldin, Neumark	Stadtkirche St. Johannes der Täufer		II/P	28	
1851	Neukünkendorf, Uckermark	Village church		I/P	7	Attribution; later extended to I/P/8, preserved
1851	Berlin-Moabit	Gefängniskirche				Preserved ???
1854	Falkenthal	Ev. Dorfkirche		I/P	8	Preserved
1853	Leppin, Mecklenburg	Village church		I/P	9	Preserved
1854	Friedersdorf near Seelow	Ev. Dorfkirche	I/P	9	Replaced in 1999.	
1854	Berlin-Mitte	Reformierte Synagoge Johannisstraße		II/P	18	Replaced in 1912
1855	Berlin-Friedrichshain	St. Markus		II/P	30	Probably not preserved
1855	Templin, Uckermark	St. Maria und Magdalenen	II/P	37	Casing by Gottlieb Scholtze from 1769, replaced in 1921 by Jehmlich with some pipes, baroque casings preserved	
1856	Berlin-Friedrichshain	St. Andreas		II/P	27	Probably destroyed
1856	Brodowin, Uckermark	Village church		I/P	9	Preserved.
1856	Hennigsdorf near Berlin	Martin-Luther-Kirche		II/P		Not preserved
1856	Schwedt/Oder, Uckermark	St. Katharinen		I/P		Not preserved
1856	Stüdenitz	Dorfkirche	I/P	10	Largely preserved.	
1856	Berlin-Prenzlauer Berg	Elisabethstift Kapelle		I/P	7	Builder unknown, assumption Buchholz, Lange or Dinse.
1857	Berlin-Kreuzberg	Realschule		II/P	9	Probably not preserved
1857	Königsberg	St. Johannis				Destroyed in 1945
1857	Memel, Ostpreußen	St. Johannis		III/P	42	Not preserved
1858	Berlin-Friedrichshain	St. Bartholomäus		II/P	17	Not preserved
1858	Berlin-Rosenthal	Ev. Dorfkirche		I/P	9	
1858	Cumlosen	Evangelische Kirche		I/P	10	Preserved
1859	Berlin-Pankow	Dorfkirche Zu den vier Evangelisten		II/P	14	Not preserved
1859	Schippenbeil, Ostpreußen, heute Sępopol	Stadtkirche, heute St. Michael	II/P	23	Preserved.	
1859	Stolpe bei Berlin	Dorfkirche		I/P	8	Preserved; with Ferdinand Lange
1860	Berlin-Kreuzberg	St. Lukas		II/P	28	Not preserved
1860	Berlin-Mitte	St. Michael				Not preserved
1860	Berlin-Mitte	St. Petri	IV/P	60	Later extended to 72 stops, destroyed in 1945.	
1860	Hohengüstow	Village church		II/P	11	
1860	Schmatzin	Village church		I/P	6	
1861	Bredow	Village church		II/P	11	Preserved ?
1862	Berlin-Mitte	Königliche Oper				Not preserved

==== As Carl August Buchholz & Sohn ====
From around 1866, the company operated under the name Carl August Buchholz & Sohn.

Year	Location	Building	Picture	Manual	Casing	Notes
1866	Berlin-Mitte	New Synagogue		III/P	45	Destroyed in 1945 at the latest
1867	Grieben	Evangelische Kirche		II/P	9	
1867	Lanke	Evangelische Kirche		I/P	9	
1868	Flatow	Evangelische Kirche		II/P	12	
1868	Neu Boltenhagen	St. Marien		II/P	8	
1869	Diedersdorf	Evangelische Kirche		I/P	7	
1869	Düpow	Evangelische Kirche		I/P	9	
1869	Melkof	Gutskirche Melkof		II/P	10	Restored in 2018 by the Plauer organ builder Andreas Arnold.
1869	Potsdam	St. Peter and Paul		II/P	25	Reconstruction in 1936 (including electrification) and addition of a third manual by Karl and Hans-Joachim Schuke (Potsdam), using Buchholz pipe material (11 stops complete and 10 stops partially preserved). →Orgel
1870	Netzelkow	Evangelische Kirche				
1872	Klein Oschersleben	Ev.-luth. Kirche		II/P	14	
1876	Gutengermendorf	Evangelische Kirche				
1878	Potsdam	Bethlehemkirche				
1882	Hall of the Reichshallentheater	Berlin-Mitte		II/P	18	Erected in 1893 in St. Matthias, Berlin, replaced in 1914.
1884	Nossendorf	Ev.-luth. St. Marien				
1884	Alt Gaarz	Ev. Kirche Rerik		I/P	13	
1884	Ribbeck	Evangelische Kirche		I/P	22	
?	Brandenburg an der Havel	St. Johannis (Brandenburg an der Havel)		II/P	18	

=== Conversions and repairs ===
Year	Location	Building	Picture	Manual	Casing	Notes
1826	Bad Wilsnack	St. Nikolai				
1828	Stralsund	St. Marien				→ Stellwagen-Orgel
1829	Berlin-Mitte	St. Mary's Church, Berlin				
1833	Berlin	Dorotheenstädtische Kirche				
1833	Berlin-Mitte	Friedrichswerdersche Kirche				
1837	Zachow	Village church	(orgellandschaftbrandenburg.de)	I/P	11	Instrument by Joachim Wagner
1840	Osterburg	Martinskapelle				
1845	Angermünde	St. Marien				
1851	Berlin-Mitte	Parochialkirche				With his son
1851	Berlin-Kreuzberg	Jerusalemskirche				
1851	Berlin-Spandau	St. Nikolai				With his son
1851	Boitzenburg	St. Marien auf dem Berge				With his son
1857	Nauen	St. Jacobi				With his son
1861	Halberstadt	Halberstadt Cathedral				With his son: Orgel des Domes zu Halberstadt
1864	Brandenburg an der Havel	St. Katharinen				With his son
1865	Brandenburg an der Havel	St. Gotthardt				With his son
1877	Berlin-Mitte	Sophienkirche				With his son
