= Johann Peter Migendt =

German organ builder (1703–1767)

Johann Peter Migendt, also Migend, (1703 – 19 September 1767) was a German organ builder in Berlin and successor to Joachim Wagner.

== Life ==
Migend was born in Birthälm, Principality of Transylvania (now Biertan, Sibiu County, Romania). From 1731/32 he worked for Joachim Wagner in Berlin, and from 1741 he was his master craftsman after the death of Kallensee. A joint contract with Wagner for a new organ is known from 1747, and in 1749 he took over Wagner's workshop. In 1755 Peter Migendt built a house at what later became Münzstraße 9 in the Spandauer Vorstadt, In 1756 he received the Berlin citizenship.

Among others, his employees were Georg Friedrich Grüneberg (until about 1756) and Ernst Julius Marx, who probably took over the workshop after 1667. He died in 1767 in Berlin.

== List of works (selection) ==
New organs, rebuildings, two relocations, repairs, offers for new organs and expertises are known from Johann Peter Migendt. The organs in Ueckermünde (previously Berlin, Neue Kirche), the Amalien organ in Berlin-Karlshorst (previously in the castle) and the organ in Ringenwalde have survived.

New organ buildings

Year	Location	Church	Picture	Manual	Casing	Notes
1741	Trondheim, Norwegen	Nidaros Cathedral				Construction of the Wagner organ; preserved
1744	Angermünde	St. Marien				with Wagner; rescheduled received
1749–1751	Berlin	St.-Petri-Kirche		III/P	22	Completion of the organ begun by Wagner, at 40 feet high the largest organ in Berlin at the time; burnt in 1908
1750	Hohenselchow	Church				Not preserved
1751	Stettin (Szczecin)	Schlosskirche		I/P	13	Building contract 30 July 1750, inaugurated on 2 May 1751 in the presence of Frederick the Great; not preserved
1751/52	Stettin	St. Gertruden-Kirche		I/P	12	Not preserved
1751/1752	Berlin	Neue Kirche auf dem Gendarmenmarkt		I/P		Extended by Buchholz in 1847, sold to St. Marien Uckermünde in 1881; preserved
1753	Berlin	Bethlehems-Kirche		I		Contract of 6 February 1753, completion on 27 September 1753. Destroyed in November 1943
1754/1755	Köpenick	City church				Attribution
1755	Berlin	Schlosskirche		II/P	22	Amalienorgel, with Marx, completion December 1755; since 1767 in the Palais Unter den Linden, since 1788 in Schlosskirche Buch, 1939 temporarily stored in the Marienkirche; since 1956 in Karlshorst, Pfarrkirche zur Frohen Botschaft, reconstructed in 2010 → Orgel
1755	Rixdorf	Böhmische Brüdergemeine		I (/P?)	5	
1758	Joachimsthal	Church		I/P	12	
ca.1759	Großmutz	Church				Attibution
1760	Ringenwalde, Uckermark	Dorfkirche		I	8	Acceptance 25 October 1760, rebuilt 1913, 2006 reconstruction and extension with an independent pedal, preserved → Orgel
1761	Stettin	St. Nikolai-Kirche		II/P	26	Migendt's largest organ. Financed by the estate of Jakob Friedrich Küsel. Destroyed in the fire of the church on 9/10 December 1811.
1762	Berlin	Arbeitshaus, church		I/P	8	Not preserved

Other works

Year	Location	Church	Picture	Manual	Casing	Notes
1746/1747	Berlin-Spandau	St.-Nikolai-Kirche				Comprehensive repair of the Wagner organ from 1734; not preserved
1753	Berlin	Alte Schloss- und Domkirche		II/P	32	Transposition and modification of the organ by Johann Michael Röder from 1720. Replaced in 1817 by a new organ by Buchholz.
1754	Berlin	Jerusalem Church		II/P	26	Renovation and extension of the Wagner organ from 1723 (originally from the old Garrison Church in Potsdam).
1756	Stettin	Cathedral		III/P	46	Restoration of the organ by Matthias Schurig and Arp Schnitger (1700); Destroyed in 1944
1759	Brandenburg an der Havel	St. Peter and Paul Cathedral		II/P	33	Thorough overhaul of the Great Cathedral Organ (Wagner, 1723); preserved
