= Ernst Julius Marx =

German organ builder (1728–1799)

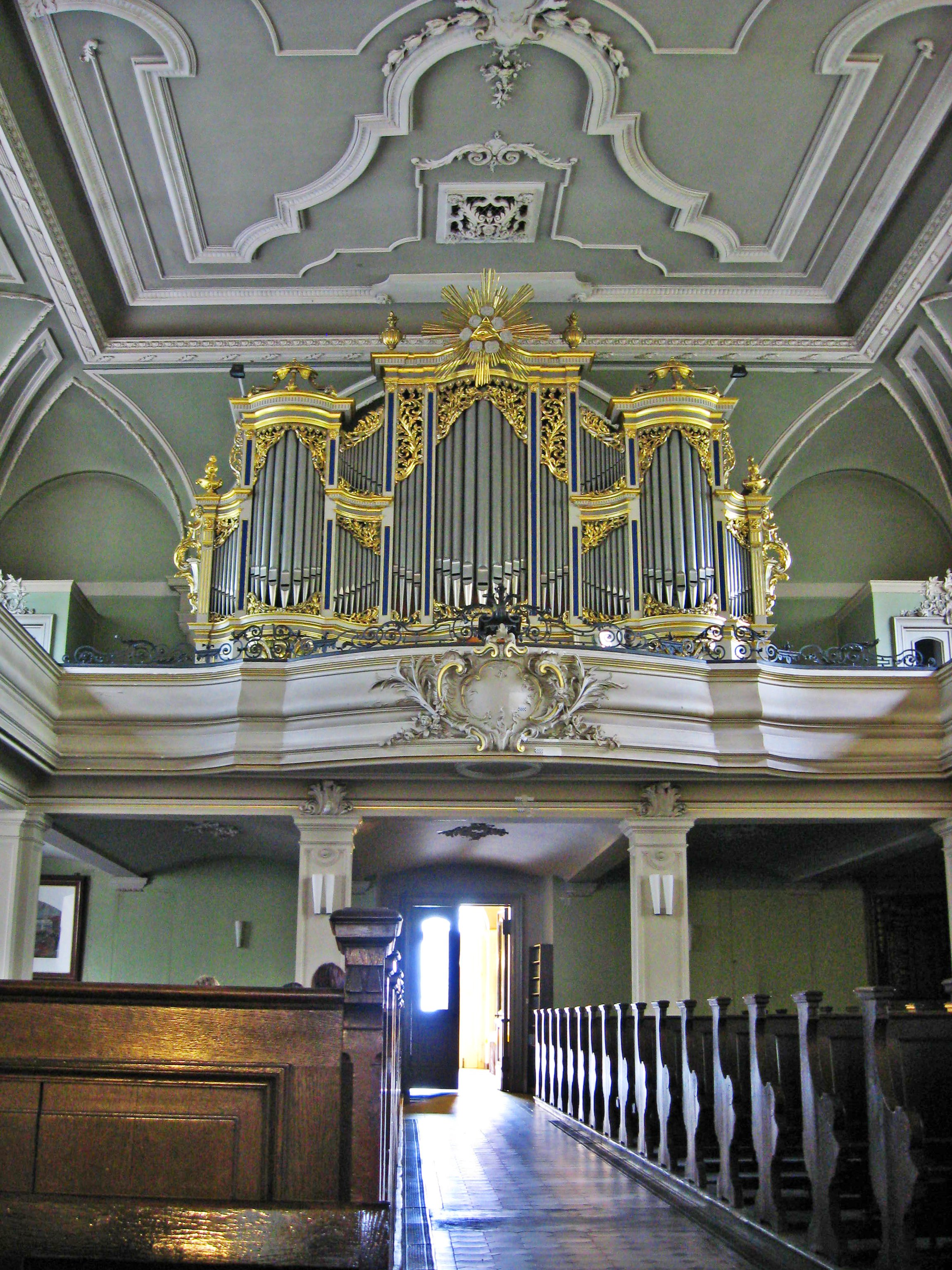
Organ in the Sophienkirche, 1790

Ernst Julius Marx (often Ernst Marx; 28 November 1728 in Ballenstedt, Principality of Anhalt-Bernburg – 25 March 1799) was an important German organ builder in Berlin. He worked in the tradition of Joachim Wagner.

== Life ==
The father George Christoph Marx was a master carpenter in Ballenstedt. Ernst Marx had been employed in the workshop of Johann Peter Migendt in Berlin since 1753/55 at the latest. It is doubtful whether he lived to see Joachim Wagner, who died in 1749. Marx worked together with Migendt (in Companie) and married a sister of Migendt's wife, Maria Louisa Balke, in 1756.

After the death of Peter Migendt in 1767, he continued the workshop alone. Pupils included Johann Simon Buchholz, son-in-law Johann Friedrich Falckenhagen, and son Friedrich Emanuel Marx, who took over the workshop after his father's death in 1799.

Marx was the youngest of the organ builders who carried on the tradition of Joachim Wagner (even though he was not to have known him personally) and who passed it on to his pupils. He died in Berlin, Kingdom of Prussia at the age of 70.

== List of works (selection) ==
Marx built organs in the Margraviate of Brandenburg, some also in Pomerania and Mecklenburg, and carried out rebuilding and repairs. The works in Vielitz (almost complete), Falkenwalde (previously Boitzenburg), Brunne and Plötzin (attributed), larger parts in Białogard (Belgard) and Eberswalde and Rostock, as well as prospectuses in Altenkirchen (previously Berlin Kattunfabrik), in Sophienkirche Berlin and in Strausberg. Organs that no longer exist or are only preserved in small parts are set in italics.

Year	Location	Church	Picture	Manual	Casing	Notes
1753–1755	Berlin	Schlosskirche		II/P	22	Amalienorgel, co-built for Johann Peter Migendt, 1767 in the Palais Unter den Linden, 1788 in the Schlosskirche Buch, since 1956 in Pfarrkirche Zur Frohen Botschaft in Karlshorst. → Organ
1761	Stettin	St. Nikolai		II/P	26	Contract concluded together with Johann Peter Migendt, burnt with church in 1811.
1761	Plötzin	Village church		I/P	13	Presumed authorship, also possible Gottlieb Scholtze; preserved.
1766	Altwriezen	Village church		I/P	19	with parts of the Wagner organs from 1735, some transmission stops, removed at the latest in 1973 when the church was demolished.
1769–1770	Boitzenburg	Pfarrkirche St. Marien auf dem Berge				Relocated to Falkenwalde in 1851 by Buchholz; preserved
1773	Berlin	St. Hedwig		II/P	16 (10)	Replaced in 1801.
1773–1774	Strausberg	St. Marien		II/P	28	for 1430 Taler, with 1451 pipes, replaced in 1929 by Sauer organ in the previous facade, 2015 restoration by Scheffler → Current organ.
1775	Belgard, heute Białogard, Pommern	Marienkirche				Extended by Felix Grüneberg in 1912 to III/P, 43; preserved
1775	Berlin-Friedrichstadt	Dreifaltigkeitskirche		III/P	39	rebuilt, destroyed in 1943
1776	Berlin-Friedrichstadt	Vernezobresches Palais, später Prinz-Albrecht-Palais		II/P	31	For Anna Amalia, Abbess of Quedlinburg, then in Reformed Church Frankfurt (Oder), destroyed
(ca. 1773/1777?)	Berlin	Kattunfabrik von Christian Ermeler		II/P		Year of construction unknown; 1798 nach Altenkirchen moved by Christian Erdmann Kindten, replaced in 1875, facade and stop Quintaton 8' preserved → current organl.
1777	Frankfurt (Oder)	Friedenskirche		II/P	28	Replaced in 1881
1777	Friedrichsfelde bei Berlin	Dorfkirche				Moved to Eggersdorf in 1890, replaced there in 1937.
1781–1783	Eberswalde	Maria-Magdalenen-Kirche				Rebuilt and extended several times to II/P, 27, new casing, parts preserved.
1787	Potsdam	Französisch Reformierte Kirche				Not preserved
1789	Vielitz	Village church		I/p	6	The front pipes were handed over in 1917, in 2011 extensive restoration by Rühle with reconstructed front pipes and historical tuning; almost completely preserved.
1790	Berlin	Sophienkirche				Casing partially preserved.
1791–1793	Rostock	St. Mary's Church		IV/P	64	Largest organ by Marx, in façade by Paul Schmidt from 1770, repaired several times, extended in 1938 by Sauer to IV/P, 83, about 30 stops and the windchests preserved → History of the organ.
1796	Brunne	Dorfkirche		I/P	9	Repaired by Friedrich Hermann Lütkemüller in 1865, by Hollenbach in 1893, front pipes handed over in 1917, new front pipes by Schuke in 1924/1925, restored by the Karl Schuke Berliner Orgelbauwerkstatt in 1997.
1799	Cottbus	Oberkirche				Last known organ, no preserved.

Other works

Year	Location	Church	Picture	Manual	Casing	Notes
1767	Belgard, today Białogard, Pomerania	Church				Conversions and repairs
1775–1778	Stralsund	St. Mary's Church		III/P	51	Repair and reconstruction of the Stellwagen organ → Reparaturen
1778–1779	Stralsund	St.-Jakobi-Kirche		III/P	45	Reconstruction of the organ by Christian Gottlieb Richter (1741) → Orgel
1791	Golzow, Uckermark	Village church				Transposition of the Arp Schnitger organ from 1714 into Sophienkirche Berlin (after the new Marx building there).
1796	Havelberg	Dom				Reparations
1796	Havelberg	St. Laurentius				Conversion and expansion
