= Elsey =

Elsey may refer to:

== Places ==
=== Australia ===
==== Northern Territory ====
- Elsey, Northern Territory, a locality
- Elsey National Park, a protected area
- Elsey Station, a former pastoral lease
- Electoral division of Elsey, a former electorate

=== Germany ===
- Elsey Abbey, a former women's religious house

=== United States ===
- Elsey, Missouri

== People ==
- Bill Elsey (1921–2019), British racehorse trainer
- Charles Elsey (1882–1966), British racehorse trainer
- George Elsey (1918-2015), US Naval Commander during World War 2
- Karl Elsey, Welsh footballer
- Joseph Ravenscroft Elsey (1834–1857), English-born naturalist, surgeon and explorer in Australia

== See also ==
- Elseya
