= Christian Richter =

Christian Richter may refer to:

- Christian Richter (painter, 1676), German painter, court painter in Weimar
- Christian Richter (painter) (1678–1732), Swedish miniature-painter and copyist
- Christian Gottlieb Richter (c. 1700–1763), German organ builder
