= Friedrich Emanuel Marx =

German organ builder (1767–1826)

Friedrich Emanuel Marx (27 September 1767 – 25 May 1826) was a German organ builder in Berlin.

== Life ==
Born in Berlin, Marx was named as an organ builder from about 1790 under his father Ernst Julius Marx, whose workshop in Berlin he took over after his death in 1799. Spectacular was the construction of a zinc pipe organ with a cast-iron case by Karl Friedrich Schinkel in Hohenofen in the Prignitz, which, however, had to be dismantled again after protests by the organ critic Friedrich Wilke.

Friedrich Emanuel Marx was married to Caroline Louisa Wiebe, the daughter of an innkeeper from Nauen. His son Carl Friedrich Ernst Marx also became an organ builder in Berlin, but no works by him are known.

Marx died in Berlin at the age of 58.

== List of works (selection) ==
Several new organs are known to have been built by Friedrich Marx in the Mark Brandenburg and in Schwerin, as well as rebuilds and repairs. Parts of the organs in Groß Kreutz, Selbelang, Lüdersdorf and Biesen have survived. Instruments that no longer exist are set in italics.

New Organ Buildings

Year	Location	Building	Picture	Manual	Casing	Notes
1793–1795	Schwerin	Cathedral				Completion of the organ by Johann Georg Stein; not preserved
1800	Groß Kreutz	Village church				Expansion and conversion by Alexander Schuke Potsdam Orgelbau in 1906; preserved
1805	Selbelang	St. Nikolai				Preserved
1818	Beeskow	St. Marien		II/P	23	Replaced by a cinema organ in 1931.
1818–1820	Hohenofen	Church				Zinc pipe organ in cast-iron case by Karl Friedrich Schinkel, later dismantled after protests by Wilke.
1821	Lüdersdorf near Wriezen	Village church		I/P	8	Preserved.
1825	Biesen	Village church		I	7	Positiv, restoration in 2009 by Wolfgang Nußbücker.

Other works

- 1802 Spandau, Johanniskirche, repair of the Johann Wilhelm Grüneberg organ from 1783, today in Französischer Kirche in Potsdam.
