= Wolfgang Nußbücker =

German organ builder (born 1936)

Wolfgang Nußbücker (born 22 September 1936) is a German organ builder, cantor and founder of the organ building workshop "Mecklenburger Orgelbau" operating in Plau am See.

== Life ==
Born in Thüringen, After completing his vocational training, Nußbücker worked for Löbling in Erfurt from 1950 to 1953 with Lothar Heinze in Stadtilm. After completing his master's examination in 1964 with the construction of the new organ in the then Catholic church St. Sigismund Plaue, Nußbücker founded an organ building company in Erfurt in 1965. In 1966, he settled in Plau am See in Mecklenburg.

In the following 25 years, an organ building workshop was established in the GDR. This was sometimes difficult due to a lack of materials, tools and suppliers. In the course of this, a pipe workshop was also built. The organ-building workshop became known in particular for the large number of small organs, positive and basso continuo instruments produced. More than 150 new organs were built during Nußbücker's creative period. Of the 24 organ building companies in the GDR, Nußbücker was the only one based in the three Nordbezirkes. In 1991, the name was changed to Mecklenburger Orgelbau/Wolfgang Nußbücker. Since 1999, the master organ builder and son-in-law Andreas Arnold is the new owner of the organ building company Mecklenburger Orgelbau.

== New organ buildings (selection) ==
Year	Location	Building	Picture	Manual	Casing	Notes
2007	Magdeburg	katholische Kirche St. Agnes		II/P	23	→Organ
2005	Dewitz	Ev.-luth. Kirche		I/P	7	New construction in the historic organ case →Organ →[http://www.orgelmuseum-malchow.de/orte/dewitz.htm Organ
2000	Helfta bei Eisleben	Kloster Helfta		II/P	16	→Organ
1997	Borkow	Ev.-luth. Kirche		I/P	5	→Organ
1996	Berlin-Biesdorf/Nord	Maria, Königin des Friedens				
1996	Wamckow	Dorfkirche Wamckow		I/P	5	New construction of a small organ →Organ
1995	Berlin-Hellersdorf	Ev. Kirche		II/P	11	→Orgel →Organ
1994	Rheinsberg	Ev. Kirche St. Laurentius				Neubau →Orgel sowie Teilrestaurierung der Scholtze-Orgel →Organ
1994	Hagenow	Ev.-luth. Kirche		II/P	25	
1991	Teterow	Ev.-luth. Stadtkirche		II/P	30	New construction in the historic organ case →Organ
1991	Born a. Darß	Fischerkirche		I/P	5	Masterpiece by master organ builder Andreas Arnold →Orgel →Organ
1990	Schlagsdorf	Dorfkirche Schlagsdorf		II/P	13	
1990	Benthen	Dorfkirche Benthen		II/P	9+4	→Orgel
1986	Lübz	Sophienstift Lübz		I/AP	5	→ Orgel
1986	Schönebeck (Elbe)	Kath. St.-Marien-Kirche		II/P	27	
1985	Templin	Herz Jesu Kirche		I/P	6(11)	→Orgel
1984	Berlin-Köpenick	Stadtkirche St. Laurentius		I	3	→Orgel
1983	Heiligengrabe	Kloster Stift zum Heiligengrabe, Heiliggrabkapelle		I/P	10(6)	→Orgel
1979	Schwerin	Cathedral, Thomaskapelle		III(II)/P	16(13)	→Organ

== Organ restorations (selection) ==
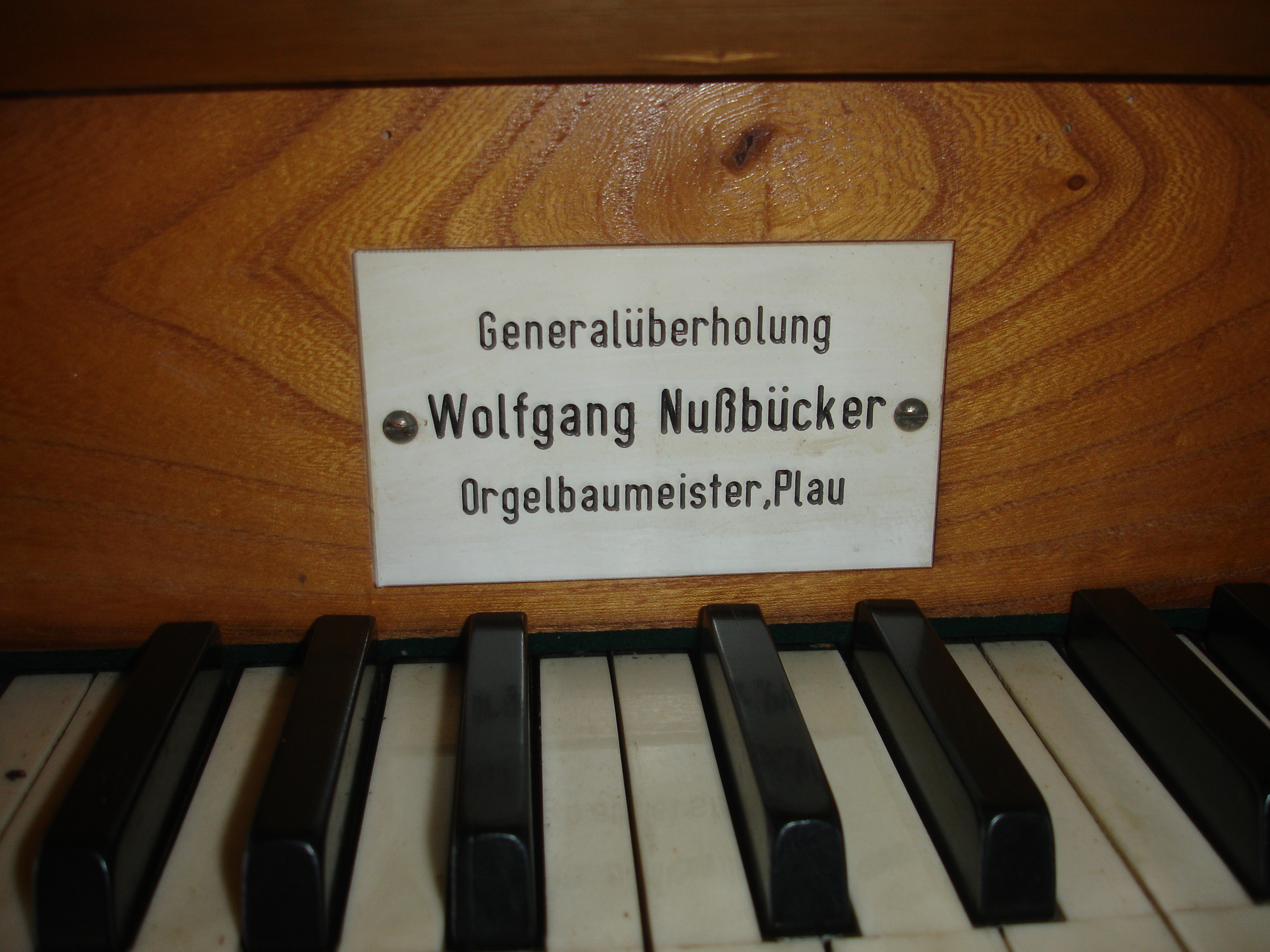
Bössow church

- Friedrich Friese II organ of the ev.-luth. Dorfkirche Redefin 2008 (Cooperation with Firma Jehmlich)
- Marcus Runge organ of the ev.-luth. Kirche Buchholz/ Ziesendorf 2007
- Barnim Grüneberg organ of the Stadtkirche Neustrelitz 2005 (cooperation with Firma Scheffler)
- Grüneberg Organ of the Dorfkirche Menkin 2005
- Albert Hollenbach Organ of the Siechenhauskapelle Neuruppin 2004
- Friedrich Friese III organ of the ev.-luth. Kirche Bülow 2003
- Friese-III organ of the ev.-luth. Dorfkirche Wamckow 2003
- Friedrich Friese I organ of the ev.-luth. Kirche Lübtheen 2002
- Johann Michael Röder organ of the Stadtkirche Wesenberg 1999 (cooperation with Firma Wegscheider)
- Runge organ of the Klosterkirche Rehna 1996
- Organ of the Dorfkirche Suckow
