= Johann Friedrich Falckenhagen =

German organ builder (1752–1823)

Johann Friedrich Falckenhagen, also Falkenhagen, (1752 – 11 May 1823) was a German organ builder in Berlin.

== Life and work ==
The father David Falckenhagen was a master carpenter in Stargard. Friedrich Falckenhagen became an employee of the organ builder Ernst Julius Marx in Berlin and married his daughter Catharina Dorothea Elisabeth in the Sophienkirche on 16 May 1786.

In 1789, he made an offer on behalf of Marx to repair the organ in the Marienkirche in Bernau bei Berlin. However, the town's approval was given to Johann Simon Buchholz, who was just setting up his own business and had also worked for Marx until then. In 1800, Falckenberg carried out a comprehensive reduction (Simplificierung) of the Wagner-Orgel in the St. Mary's Church, Berlin. At the suggestion of Georg Joseph Vogler, he removed 1001 of 2556 pipes and reduced the casing from 40 to 27. In 1808, he carried out repairs to the organ of the Parochialkirche.

In 1820 and 1823, his address was Kleiner Jüdenhof 3 in Berlin-Mitte, as "Instrumentenmacher". He died on 11 May of that year and was buried in the cemetery of St. Mary's Church.
