= Philipp Wilhelm Grüneberg =

German organ builder (1710–1777)

Philipp Wilhelm Grüneberg (1710 – 1777) was a German organ builder. He founded the important organ building family Grüneberg in Brandenburg and Stettin.

== Life ==
Born in Magdeburg, was possibly an associate of David Zuberbier, from whom he continued a work in Zerbst. From about 1752, Grüneberg was active in his hometown, where he was mentioned in 1760 as one of four organ builders. Around 1767, he went to Belgard in Pomerania, where he was also organist.

His son Johann Wilhelm Grüneberg became an organ builder in Brandenburg an der Havel, Georg Friedrich Grüneberg in Szczecin in Pomerania.

== Works (selection) ==
Two new buildings are known by Philipp Wilhelm Grüneberg, as well as some repairs and a mood offering, all of which are indicated.

New organ buildings

Year	Location	GBuildings	Picture	Manual	Stops	Notes
1753–1754	Magdeburg	Wallonerkirche		II/P	25	replaced around 1850
1767–1776	Białogard, Pommern	St. Petri				

Other works

Year	Location	Building	Picture	Manual	Stops	Notes
nach 1743	Zerbst	St. Bartholomaei (Schlosskirche)				Repairs, continuation of the work of David Zuberbier, bellows repair in 1749
1758	Kösen (Kösin?)	Evangelische Kirche				Repair
1762, 1763	Magdeburg	Unser Lieben Frauen				Repair (and tuning?)
1763	Magdeburg	Wallonisch-reformierte Kirche				Repair
1766	Naumburg	St. Wenzel				Repair
After 1767	Köslin (Koszalin), Pommern	St. Marien				
