= Heinrich Andreas Contius =

German organ builder (1708–1795)

- Born: 1708; Halle an der Saale, Duchy of Magdeburg
- Died: 1795 (aged 86–87); Valmiera, Livonia, Russian Empire
- Occupation: Organ builder
- Known for: Leading organ builder in the Baltic states in the 18th century

Heinrich Andreas Contius, also Cuntius (1708 – 1795 in Valmiera, Livonia, Russian Empire) was one of the most important organ builders in the Baltic states in the 18th century.

== Life ==
Contius was born in 1708 as the son of the organ builder Christoph Cuntzius in Halle an der Saale, Duchy of Magdeburg. In 1732 he is recorded as a journeyman of Joachim Wagner. He initially had his own workshop in Altenburg. From 1736/37, Contius worked in Halle and the surrounding area. From 1748, a letter of recommendation from Johann Sebastian Bach in his favour for the planned new organ building in the Konzerthalle Carl Philipp Emanuel Bach Frankfurt is known, then a letter to Contius himself. Den Auftrag erhielt er aber nicht.

In 1760, Contius moved to Riga in Courland, where he built an organ for the St. James's Cathedral, Riga. He then worked in Tallinn in Estonia and became the leading organ builder there. In 1771, he returned to Riga and in 1773 was commissioned to build a new building in the great Holy Trinity Cathedral, Liepāja (Libau), which was completed in 1779. In Valmiera, Contius opened a workshop together with Johann Andreas Stein (1752–1821) from Augsburg, who subsequently built further organs in Courland (1787 Cēsis, St. Johannis, 1788 Evele Wohlfahrtskirche).

== Works (selection) ==
Contius is known to have built several new organs, as well as repairs and a maintenance contract in the Duchy of Magdeburg, Courland and Estonia. Preserved are most of the Holy Trinity Cathedral, Liepāja, as well as the casing in the St. James's Cathedral in Riga. A replica of the organ in Liepāja has been under construction since 2016 in Leuven, Belgium.

Year	Location	Church	Picture	Manual	Casing	Notes
1739	Halle (Saale)	St. Ulrich				Renovation of the organ
1743	Halle (Saale)	St. Bartholomäus		II/P	22	New building.
1750	Dieskau	Annenkirche		II/P	22	New building
1751	Wallwitz					New building
1759	Merseburg	St. Maximi				Stop for repair with 120 Taler, not executed
1762 (?)	Merseburg	Cathedral				Supervision and maintenance of the castle and cathedral organ.
1760–1763	Riga, Kurland	St. James's Cathedral		II/P	25	Casing preserved, Neubau
1768	Tallinn, Estland	St. Nicholas Church		III		Renovation of the organ from 1668
1773–1779	Liepāja	Holy Trinity Cathedral		II/P	38	New construction in facade and with parts of the organ by Johann Heinrich Joachim from about 1750, extended several times, lastly by Barnim Grüneberg in 1885 to become the largest organ in the world at that time, with IV/P, 131; preserved. → Organ of the Holy Trinity Cathedral, Liepāja seit 2016 Replik in Sint Michiel in Leuven (Belgien).
1780	Valmiera, Livland	St. Simonis				
1783	Riga	Reformierte Kirche		II/P	14	New construction, not preserved
