= Joachim Wagner =

German organ builder (1690–1749)

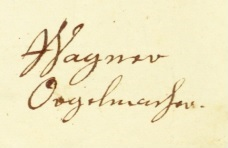
Signature "Wagner Orgelmacher"

Joachim Wagner (13 April 1690 – 23 May 1749) was an important Brandenburg organ builder.

== Origin ==
Wagner was born as the son of the pastor Christoph Wagner (1653-1709) and his wife Anna Dorothea née Tiefenbach in Karow, Duchy of Magdeburg. His brothers, the pastors Johann Christoph Wagner (1683-1750, since 1710 his father's successor in office in Karow), and Friedrich Wagner (1693-1760), later had an influence on his work.

== Work ==
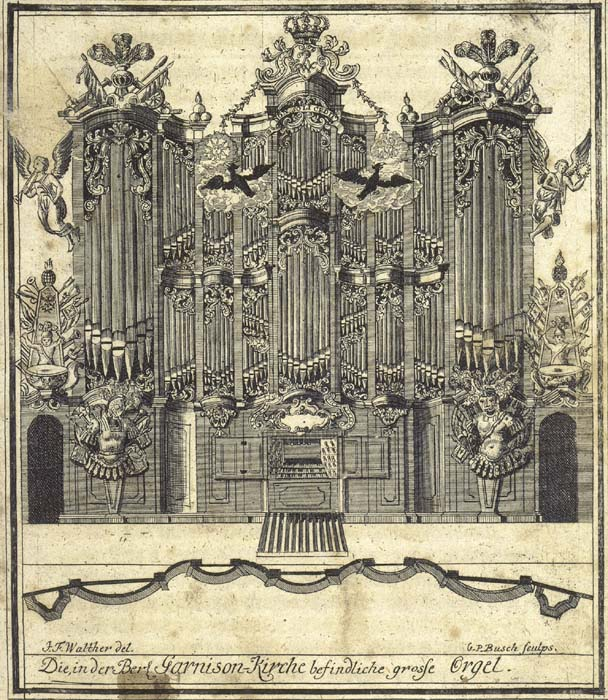
Orgel der Berliner Garnisonkirche, 1737

It is possible that Wagner learned the organ building trade from Schnitger's student Matthäus Hartmann (died ca. 1745). Evidence shows that Christoph Treutmann the Elder (c. 1673-1757) in Magdeburg was Wagner's teacher. As a journeyman, Wagner went on the road and also worked for Gottfried Silbermann in Freiberg for two years. He came to Berlin in 1719. He completed his masterpiece there in 1723 with the organ in the St. Mary's Church, Berlin (already consecrated in 1721), which had three manuals and 40 stops. In Berlin, he also built his largest work with 50 stops on three manuals in the newly built Berliner Garnisonkirche between 1724 and 1726. (rebuilt in 1892, burned in 1908).

He was by far the most important organ builder of the Baroque period in the Margraviate of Brandenburg, as conditions were particularly favourable during the reign of the Soldier King Frederick William I of Prussia (1713-1740) offered favourable conditions for this. He is sometimes referred to as the "Märkischer Silbermann".

Wagner apparently died in Salzwedel while working on his last organ for the Marienkirche there at age 59, as it was completed by Gottlieb Scholtze.

== Students ==
Among his pupils who continued his traditions were:

- Matthias Kallensee, since 1720, later Werkmeister, died in 1741.
- Johann Peter Migendt, since 1731/32, since 1741 Werkmeister, took over the workshop in 1749 (c. 1703- 1767)
- Heinrich Andreas Contius, 1732 to about 1738, thereafter most important organ builder in the Baltic (1708- 1795)
- Georg Neumann, 1732-1742
- Gottlieb Scholtze, 1740/44 carving for Wagner, afterwards organ builder's pupil (c. 1713- c. 1782)
- Johann Gottlieb Mehnert, at the latest since 1746, afterwards organ builder in Stettin
- Ernst Julius Marx, possibly only with Migendt after 1749?, afterwards organ builder in Berlin

== Organs ==
=== Sphere of influence ===
In the course of his life, Wagner built over 50 individually designed organs, both for large churches and for smaller village churches, of which 15 have been preserved in larger parts, as well as eight cases or smaller remnants.

From his workshop in Berlin, his sphere of activity extended mainly to the northern German Prussian Hohenzollern states, in addition to the residential cities of Berlin (8 organs) and Potsdam (4) and Brandenburg an der Havel (3) to the entire Margraviate of Brandenburg including Altmark (Werben (Elbe), Salzwedel), Uckermark (Angermünde, Gramzow, Schwedt/Oder) and Neumark (Königsberg), in Pomerania (Stargard, Wartin) and the Duchy of Magdeburg. But also in Kursachsen (Jüterbog) and Norway (Nidaros Cathedral in Trondheim) he built organs. Today, 15 organs with the largest original components have been preserved, the most valuable in the St. Peter and Paul Cathedral Brandenburg, as well as 8 cases or smaller remains.

=== Characteristics ===
Wagner built instruments that combined and further developed Central German and North German elements of organ building. However, the work principle cultivated in the baroque period of northern Germany was abandoned in favour of sound fusion and a single overall case. The sound characteristics include the powerful intonation, the well-staffed pedal keyboard (without pedal coupler), terceous mixtures and the manual transmissions built into some instruments.

In the course of his life he built over fifty individually designed organs, both for large churches and for small village churches, no two of which were completely alike. His casings were rich in variation, often bearing sculptural decoration and occasionally moving timpani and trumpet angels in the Silesian tradition, inspired by Johann Michael Röder. All of these instruments are extremely valuable testimonies to a highly developed musical culture, which were also used by the musical greats of their time. On 8 May 1747, for example, Johann Sebastian Bach played the relatively small Wagner organ at Potsdam's Heilig-Geist-Kirche. The organ works of his son Carl Philipp Emanuel Bach were written in the context of the organ built in 1755 by Ernst Marx and Peter Migendt. house organ of the princess Anna Amalia, which is now located in Karlshorst.

=== Today's holdings ===
Fires, lack of maintenance as well as alterations resulting from the musical zeitgeist of the 19th century and the consequences of the Second World War have left only 15 more or less originally preserved instruments and eight other instrument remnants, mainly cases (some still with original stock). The Potsdam firm Alexander Schuke Potsdam Orgelbau has rendered great service to the restoration of Wagner organs in the course of its existence.

On 26 August 2006, the Joachim Wagner Society was founded in Rühstädt with the aim of researching and maintaining his unique heritage.

== List of works ==
Today, 51 new organs, one disposition design, four conversions and some repairs are known from Wagner. 15 organs in larger parts and eight pipe organs are preserved, some with small remains. The most important preserved one is located in the St. Peter and Paul Cathedral in Brandenburg.

The size of the instruments is indicated in the fifth column by the number of manuals and the number of sounding stops in the sixth column. A capital P stands for an independent pedal, a small p for an attached pedal. An italicisation indicates that the organ in question is no longer preserved or that only the facade is still by Wagner.

Year	Location	Building	Picture	Manual	Register	Notes
1720–1723	Berlin	St. Marien		III/P	40	Front and register preserved, integrated in new building by Alfred Kern & fils (2002)
1722–1723	Potsdam	Old Garnisonkirche		II/P	25	Set up in the Jerusalemkirche, Berlin, in 1732; Dismantled around 1878 when the church was rebuilt; not preserved
1725	Brandenburg an der Havel	Dom St. Peter und Paul		II/P	33	Prospect, stops and pipes almost completely preserved in the original, largest preserved and functioning Wagner organ. → Orgel
1724–1726	Berlin	Garnisonkirche		III/P	50	Not preserved
1724–1726	Berlin	Reithaus		II/P	18	Not preserved
1726–1727	Blumberg	Dorfkirche		I	7	Not preserved
1726–1727	Brandenburg an der Havel	St. Katharinen		III/P	40	Front preserved → Orgel
172	Berlin	St. Georgen		II/P	16	Not preserved
1727	Berlin	Großes Friedrichs-Hospital, Waisenhauskirche		I/P	9–10	Not preserved
1728	Bad Freienwalde (Oder)	St. Nikolai		II/P	24	Façade preserved
1729–1730	Wriezen	St. Marien		III/P	34	Not preserved
1730	Templin	Maria-Magdalenen-Kirche		II/P	30	Not preserved
1730	Potsdam	Heilig-Geist-Kirche		II/P	22	Not preserved
1730–1731	Stargard	Johanniskirche		II/P	21	Not preserved
1731	Berlin	St. Gertraud, Hospitalkirche		I	9	Not preserved
1731–1732	Berlin	Parochialkirche		II/P	32	Not preserved
1731–1732	Potsdam	Garnisonkirche		III/P	42	Not preserved
1733	Zehdenick	Stadtkirche Zehdenick		II/P	18	Not preserved
1732–1734	Berlin-Spandau	St.-Nikolai-Kirche		II/P	31	Not preserved
1734	Berlin	Französische Friedrichstadtkirche		I/P	13	Not preserved
1734–1735	Altwriezen	Village church		I	6	Not preserved
1734–1736	Königsberg in der Neumark	St. Marien		III	45	Not preserved
1735–1736	Nahausen bei Königsberg in der Neumark	Village church		I	7	Not preserved
1735	Schwedt/Oder	Schlosskapelle		I/P oder II/P	15 oder 21	Drafts from 19 September 1735, implementation unknown.
1736	Gramzow	Ev. Stadtkirche St. Marien		I/P	9	In the Dorfkirche Sternhagen since 1857, 2001-2009 restored and reconstructed by Alexander Schuke Potsdam Orgelbau
? um 1736	Zachow (Czachów), Neumark	Dorfkirche		I	7	Side-playing parapet organ without pedal, rebuilt in 1837 by Buchholz with pedal, 1945 all metal pipes disappeared, 2003 discovery of Wagner authorship by Karl Richter, today empty facade with Buchholz pedal wood pipes preserved.
1736–1737	Brandenburg an der Havel	St. Gotthardt		II/P	31	Not preserved
1737	Potsdam	Kirche des Militärwaisenhauses		I	8	in the St. Marien in Pritzerbe since 1792.
1737	Jüterbog	Liebfrauenkirche		I/P	13	Largely preserved → Orgel
1737–1738	Bochow (Niedergörsdorf)	Village church		I/p	7 oder 9	Not preserved
1738	Rühstädt	Dorfkirche		I/P	10	Casing and some stops preserved, rest reconstructed.
1737–1739	Brüssow	St. Sophia		I/P	11	Not preserved
1739	Schönwalde	Dorfkirche		I/P	12	Preserved → Orgel
1738–1740	Magdeburg	Heilige-Geist-Kirche		III/P	46	Not preserved
1737–1741	Jüterbog	St. Nikolai		II/P	32	The front has been preserved; it was built by J. Ch. Angermann from 1737 to 1741, as was the organ. Parts of the previous organ from 1602 were used in the construction of the organ. → Orgel.
1739–1741	Treuenbrietzen	St. Marien		II/P	30	Preserved
1739–1741	Trondheim	Nidaros Cathedral		II/P	30	Restored in 1994 → Organ
1741	Treuenbrietzen	St. Nikolai		I/P	18?	Not preserved
1741	Neuruppin	Sankt Marien		III/P	42	Not preserved
1742	Wusterhausen/Dosse	St. Peter und Paul		II/P	29	Redisposed several times; restored in 1978.
1741–1742	Bötzow	St. Nikolai		I/P	10	Modified several times
1742–1744	Angermünde	Stadtpfarrkirche St. Marien		II/P	30	Four timpani angels can be operated from the pedal. Painting of the facade in 1773; 1845 and 1899-1901 redispositions; 1967-1976 restoration in two sections by Schuke
1743–1744	Wartin	Ev. Kirche		I/P	9	durch Christian Friedrich Voit erweitert; zum großen Teil erhalten
1744–1745	Gransee	St. Marien		II/P	21	Front and some pipes preserved.
1744–1745	Passow	Dorfkirche		I/P	9	Modified several times; Preserved casing and partial pipework
1744–1745	?	?		II	12	only preserved Transmission organ Wagner's, original location unknown; since 1802/03 in Warsaw, church of St. Benon, from 1824 in Pruszyn, dismantled and put into storage in 1969, restored in 2008-2010 and re-installed in the diocesan bishop's house in Gmina Siedlce.
ca. 1745	Felchow	Ev. Kirche		I	9	Changed several times
1745	Flemsdorf	Village church		I	8	Poorly preserved
1745–1746	Ragow (Mittenwalde)	Heilige-Geist-Kirche		I/P	8	Not preserved
1747	Werben (Elbe)	St. Johannis		II/P	27	Converted to pneumatic by Albert Kohl in 1916, front and 11 stops preserved. Restoration in the spirit of Wagner is planned.
1748	Berlin	St. Petri		III/P	50	Added by Migendt in 1751, lost in fire in 1908
1748–1749	Salzwedel	St. Marien		III/P	39	Completion by Scholtze, front preserved
