= Holy Spirit Hospital (Berlin) =

Historic hospital in Berlin, Germany

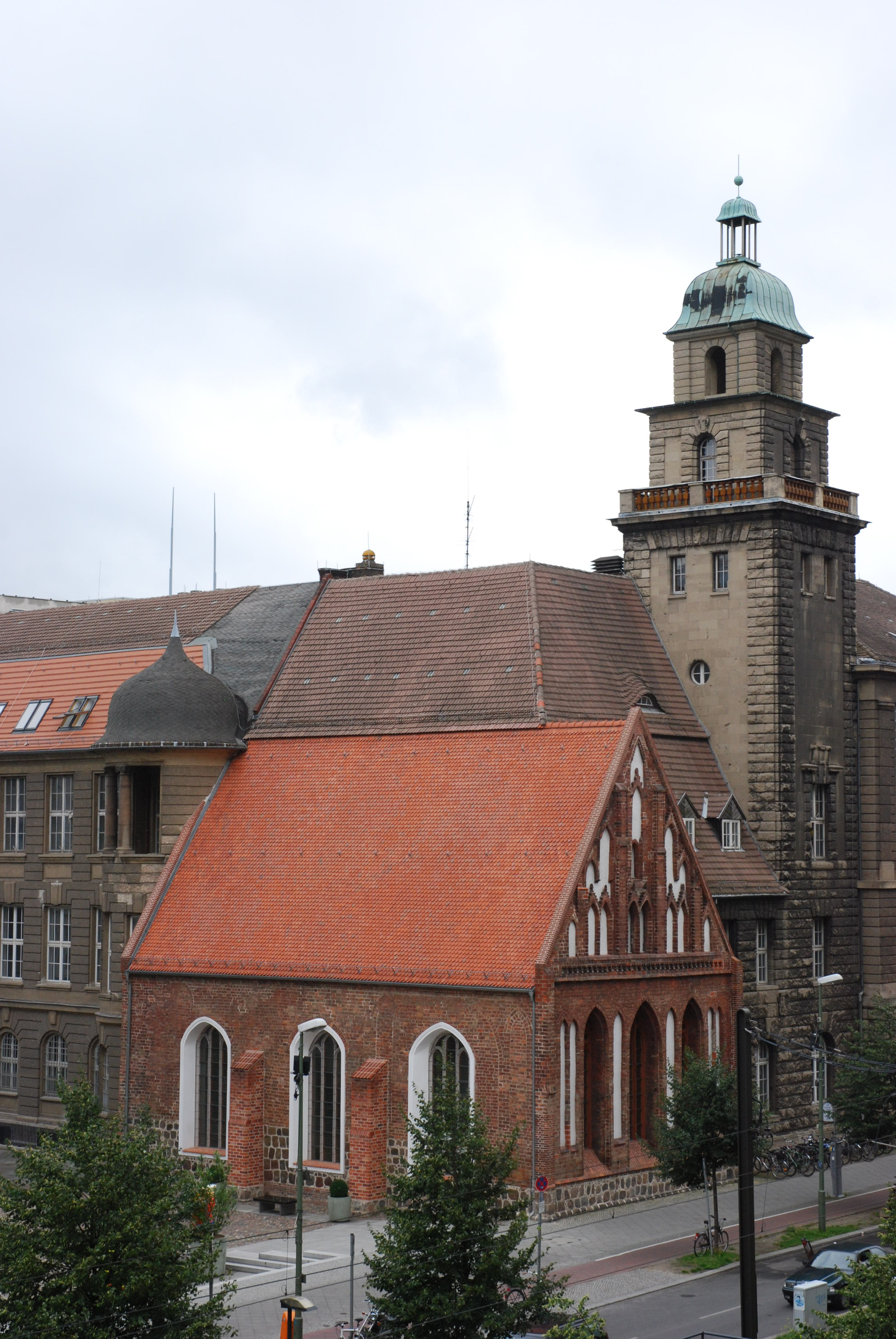

The Holy Spirit Hospital (Berlin) (Heilig-Geist-Spital in German) was one of the earliest hospitals in Berlin, established in 1250. It was located on the western side of Spandauer Straße.

The hospital was a complex of buildings consisting of a house for the poor and sick, a home for the hospital staff, a small chapel, a preacher and sexton house, a hermitage and a large garden. The Heilig-Geist-Kapelle, which belongs to the hospital, was built around 1300 and is one of the oldest surviving buildings in Berlin. It remained intact during the Second World War, was thoroughly renovated in 1978/1979, and again in 2005. It now serves as a ballroom for the Humboldt University on special occasions.
