= Johann Simon Buchholz =

German organ builder (1758–1825)

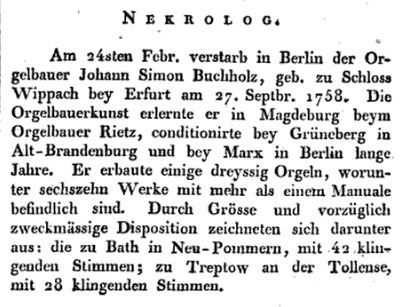
Johann Simon Buchholz's obituary in the Allgemeine musikalische Zeitung, March 1825

Johann Simon Buchholz (27 September 1758 – 24 February 1825) was a German organ builder.

== Life ==
Born in Schloßvippach, Buchholz learned his trade from Adam Heinrich Rietze in Magdeburg, from his later brother-in-law Johann Wilhelm Grüneberg in Brandenburg and from Ernst Julius Marx in Berlin. There, Buchholz founded his own workshop in 1790. He is considered one of the most important Prussian organ builders and built over 30 organs.

Buchholz married Dorothea Sophia Meier, the youngest daughter of the Brandenburg bookbinder Johann Anton Peter Meier, on 25 November 1788. The wedding took place in the house of his brother-in-law Johann Wilhelm Grüneberg. Their son Carl August Buchholz also became an organ builder. Johann Simon Buchholz built 19 organs in the years 1812 to 1825 together with his son Carl August. The organ with the largest original inventory in Germany is the Orgel der St.-Marien-Kirche in Barth, Germany.

Buchholz died in Berlin at the age of 66.

== Work ==
Simon built the organs listed below (sorted alphabetically by place name) between 1812 and 1825 together with his son Carl August. The source references refer on the one hand to the information on the location, place, year of construction, original condition and on the other hand to the whereabouts and condition:

Year	Location	Building	Picture	Manual	Rows of pipes	Notes
1812	Altentreptow	Kirche St. Peter		II/P	23	Parts and stops integrated into an organ built in 1865 by Barnim Grüneberg, renovated in 2002/2003. II/P 31.
1817	Berlin	(Alter) Dom		II/P	32	?
1817	Neulietzegöricke	Ev. Kirche		I	2	?
1817	Neu Hardenberg	Ev. Kirche		II/P	21	?
1818	Demmin	St. Bartholomaei		II/P	40	→ Orgel der St.-Bartholomaei-Kirche (Demmin)
1819	Ahrensfelde	Kirche Ahrensfelde		I	5	
1820	Baruth/Mark	Stadtpfarrkirche St. Sebastian		II/P	21	Replaced
1820	Britz	Ev. Kirche		I/P	7	Preserved
1820	Gristow	Ev. Dorfkirche		I/P	15	→ Orgel → Orgel
1821	Berlin-Schöneberg	Ev. Kirche		I/P	11	?
1821	Barth	St.-Marien-Kirche		II/P	42	→ Orgel der St.-Marien-Kirche (Barth)
1821	Greifswald	Kirche St. Jakobi		II/P	28	Instrument destroyed in a tower fire in 1955
1822	Wachow	Ev. Kirche		I/p	10	Preserved
1822	Berlin	Institut für Kirchenmusik		II/P	13	Today: Kirche Petkus
1823	Rixdorf	Bethlehemskirche		I/p	9 (4 of them also conveyed as pedal stops)	Moved to the Dorfkirche Alt Gaarz in 1895, Restored and moved to the Marienkirche in 2018/2019.Nossendorf.
1823	Seelübbe	Ev. Kirche		II/P		?
1823	Teltow	Kirche St. Andreas		I/P	17	?
1824	Stargard Szczeciński	St. Mary's Church, Stargard		III/P	32	?
1825	Osterburg	Kirche St. Nikolai		II/P	22	Rebuilt several times; restored in 2011 ff. by Kristian Wegscheider (Dresden).
