= Johann Michael Röder =

German organ builder

Johann Michael Röder was a German organ builder in Berlin and Silesia from the first half of the 18th century. He was a pupil of Arp Schnitger.

== Life ==
Röder's year of birth and death are unknown. He was apprenticed to Schnitger for four years as a journeyman carpenter. In 1712, Vincent Lübeck described him in a letter to the Tangermünde council as a "big talker" who "greatly despises and contempts Herr Schnitger". In Röder's works, the influence of his teacher can be clearly heard, but he went his own way in the external design of the organs and moved further away from Schnitger than any of his students. Thus, he abandoned the Werkprinzip, did without a Rückpositiv and built the pipe organ rather flat. His special technical skills earned him the name "Mechanicus" and led to all kinds of late Baroque such as kettledrum-beating angels, eagles, stars of orders, suns and others.

Johann Mattheson commented positively on Röder's organ in Breslau: "All emperors, kings and princes would be astonished if they saw the engraving of it and it consists of 56 sounding parts: 4 principals, as one a 32, one a 16 and two a 8 feet, a glockenspiel, which is tracted by the angels moving in the Gloria with their hammers in their hands with the help of the pedal as well as a pair of küpferner (visible) timpani, on which likewise two angels perfectly present everything that can be had on natural timpani with their mallets and can be played with the trumpet as well as intros and lifts.

== List of works (selection) ==
New organs by Röder are known in Orgellandschaft Brandenburg and Lower Silesia. Some are partially preserved.

=== New organ buildings ===
Year	Location	Church	Picture	Manual	Casing	Notes
1713	Berlin	Alte Garnisonkirche		II/P	23	Transferred to the Potsdam church St. Nikolai in 1724; burnt in 1795
1716	Sydow near Bernau	Dorfkirche		I	8	Positive, later replaced by Lütkemüller.
1717	Berlin-Dorotheenstadt	Dorotheenstädtische Kirche		I/P	19	Transferred to the Stadtkirche Wesenberg in 1833, later redisposed several times; front, wind chests and pipes from 4 stops preserved. – Orgel
1720	Berlin	Alte Schloss- und Domkirche		II/P	32	not preserved
1720–1722	Krosno Odrzańskie	St. Marien, heute St. Hedwig		III/P	55	Front preserved, in 1930 new construction by Sauer.
1721–1725	Breslau	St Mary Magdalene Church, Wrocław	Engraving by FBC Strachowski	III/P	56	Reusing parts from the organ built by Martin Scheufler, Röder built the large pipe organ that adorns the nave. In the course of a new organ building in 1889-1891, the Röder organ was removed, the front went to the Silesian Museum (Katowice) and was lost after the Second World War.
1726–1729	Hirschberg (Jelenia Góra)	Gnadenkirche, today Kreuzerhöhungskirche		III/P	50	Front and about 40 complete stops preserved, in 1905 Schlag & Söhne rebuilt the organ pneumatically and extended the disposition to 70 stops, in this form the organ is completely preserved and restored in 1998
1729–1730	Großburg (Borek Strzeliński)	Dorfkirche		II/P	22	Front preserved.
1733–1737	Liegnitz (Legnica)	Ev. Marienkirche (Liebfrauenkirche)		II/P	34	1914 New construction by Friedrich Weigle with preservation of 5 stops, afterwards alterations and restorations, front and some pipes preserved
1740	Burg Stargard	Reformierte Kirche		I/P	29	not preserved
1742	Greiffenberg	Dorfkirche		I/P	7 (oder 13?)	Attribution, 1842 reconstruction by Morgenstern, (I/P, 13), 1967 restoration by Schuke on I/P, 12.
1743–1744	Prenzlau	Heilig-Geist-Kapelle		I/P	15	for 400 thalers, converted around 1899, today housing the Schlosskirche Buch.
1745	Prenzlau	Marienkirche		II/P	20	Replaced by Buchholz organ in 1847, destroyed in 1945
1746	Groß Schönebeck	Dorfkirche		I/P	12	New building offer by Joachim Wagner of 1746 not implemented, in the same year contract signed with Röder, who apparently resigned (or died) afterwards, completed by Gottlieb Scholtze in 1749, afterwards several rebuilds, case and some parts of the baroque organ preserved.

=== Further work and offers ===
Year	Location	Church	Picture	Manual	Register	Notes
1708	Bernau	St. Marien				Offer to repair and rebuild the Scherer organ of 1572 (III/P, 41), not considered, but carried out by Arp Schnitger instead.
1711–1716	Tangermünde	St. Stephan		III/P	32	Repair and rebuilding of the organ from Hans Scherer d. Ä. (1624); received half of this – Orgel
