= St. Peter and Paul Cathedral, Brandenburg =

Medieval church in Brandenburg, Germany

St Peter and Paul Cathedral
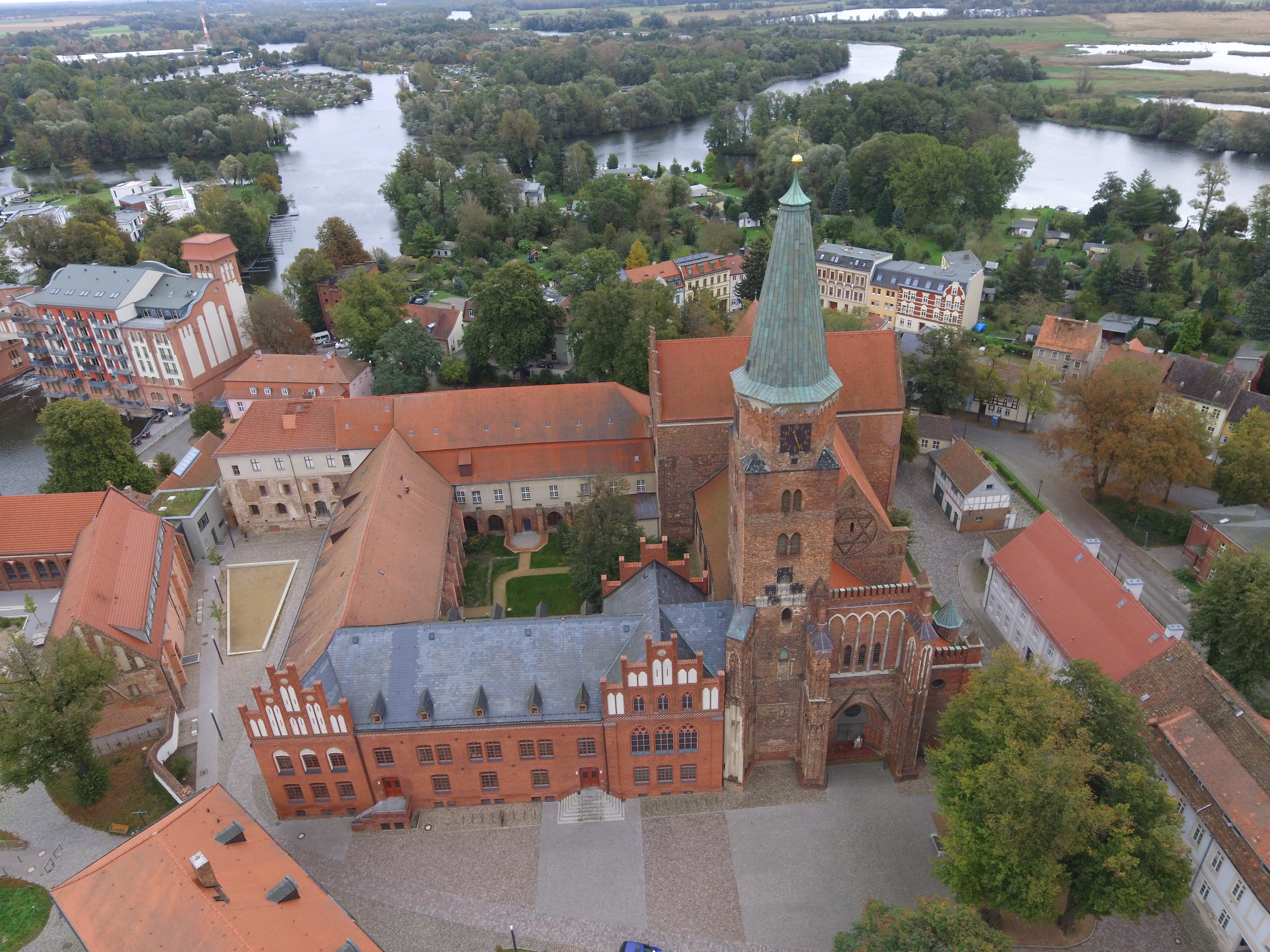
- Brandenburg Cathedral (right) and its side buildings
- St Peter and Paul Cathedral
- 52°24′54.58″N 12°34′2.64″E
- Denomination: Evangelical
- Previous denomination: Roman Catholic

Architecture
- Style: Romanesque, Gothic

The St. Peter and Paul cathedral (short: Brandenburg Cathedral) is the largest medieval church in Brandenburg an der Havel, Brandenburg, Germany. Construction began in 1165 as a Romanesque Saalkirche. It was expanded several times to a three-aisled Brick Gothic basilica. The cathedral is commonly designated “the cradle of the Mark Brandenburg” for its historic significance. The patron saints are Peter and Paul.

== History ==
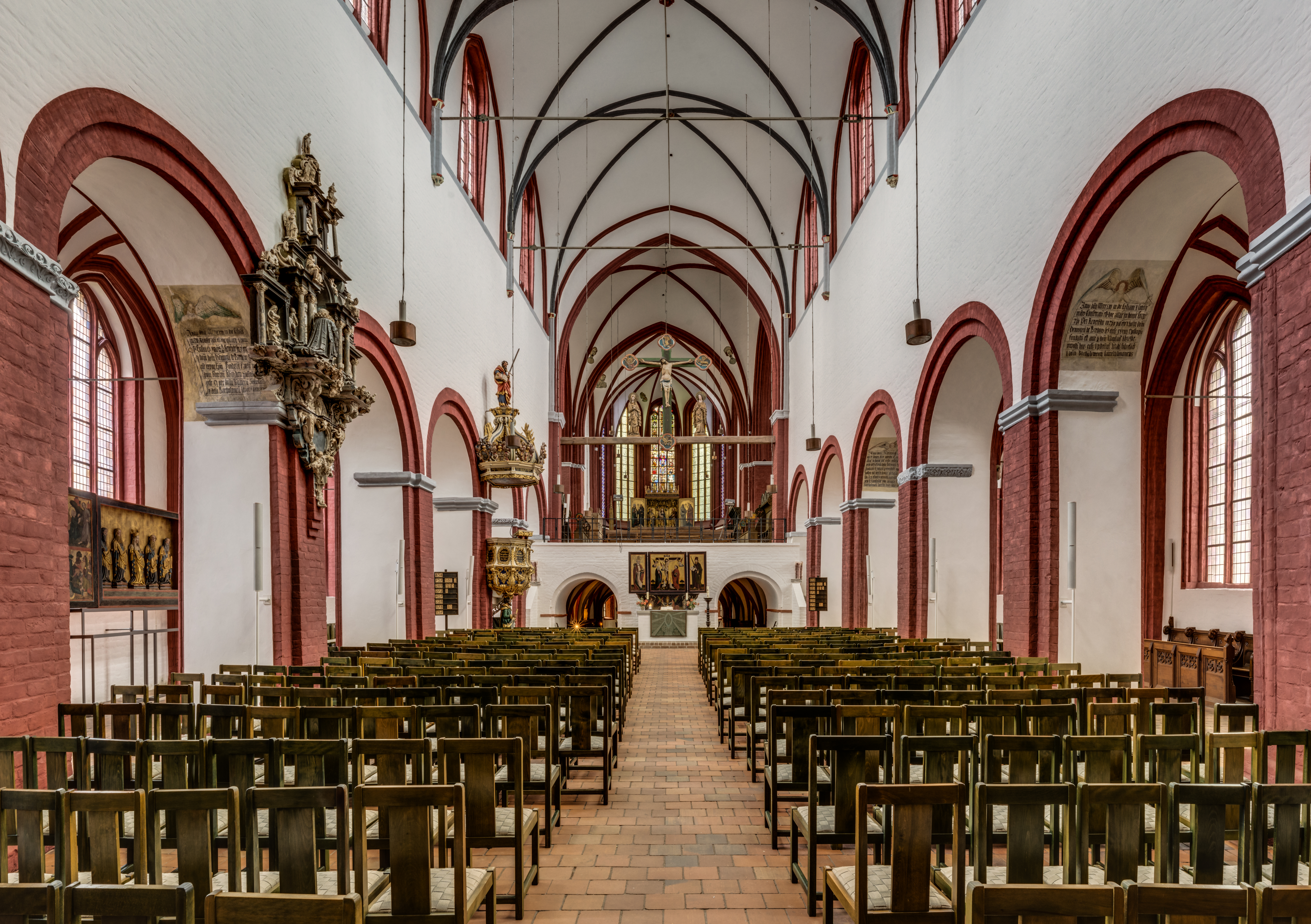
View along nave with Romanesque and Gothic elements

The Brandenburg Cathedral is located on an island between the Beetzsee and the river Havel. The ensemble of cathedral, cloister, curia and side buildings still dominate the cathedral island city district of Brandenburg. Emperor Otto I founded the Diocese of Brandenburg here in 948 on top of an older Slavic fortress. The original settlement was probably lost in the Slavic revolt of 983. The Diocese of Brandenburg was restored in 1161 as part of the successful eastward expansion of the Holy Roman Empire and the previous establishment of the Margraviate of Brandenburg by Albert the Bear in 1157.

The laying of the foundation stone for the initial Romanesque construction was documented in 1165. The building was planned as a single-nave, cross-shaped Romanesque Saalkirche made of brick. The plans were expanded to a three-aisled basilica with two west towers and an elevated choir. A crypt, open towards the main nave, was added under the choir. The double tower design was reduced to a single north tower and a stump of the south tower, likely due to lack of money or unstable soil. The western front is supported by attached buttresses on the outside. The Gothic expansion was completed around the middle of the 15th century. It is the oldest pure brick building in the state of Brandenburg with a reliable construction date and is often referred to as “the cradle of the Mark Brandenburg”.

Following the Reformation, the Catholic Diocese of Brandenburg lost the cathedral and it became Protestant. Today, the church parish belongs to the Evangelical Church in Berlin, Brandenburg and Silesian Upper Lusatia.

The interior is characterized by white walls with accented red bands along arches, windows and ribbed vaults. The main arches along the nave are rounded in the older Romanesque style whereas the ribbed vaults and windows are in later pointed Gothic style. The church is richly decorated with works of art from the Middle Ages to the 20th century. There are several elaborate stone epitaphs for local clergymen and dukes. The wooden pulpit contains elaborate carvings with floral motifs and colored statues of Peter and Paul.

The triptych “Bohemian Altar” contains carved figures of a coronation of Mary and four saints in the center flanked by twelve saints each on a golden background. It can be dated to 1375 and is connected with the visit of Emperor Charles IV to Brandenburg, when he donated valuable relics to the cathedral. The cathedral monastery archive is the oldest archive east of the river Elbe and contains the document with the first mention of the city of Berlin in 1244.

The main church organ by local organ builder Joachim Wagner was installed in 1725. It has been preserved almost entirely in its original condition.

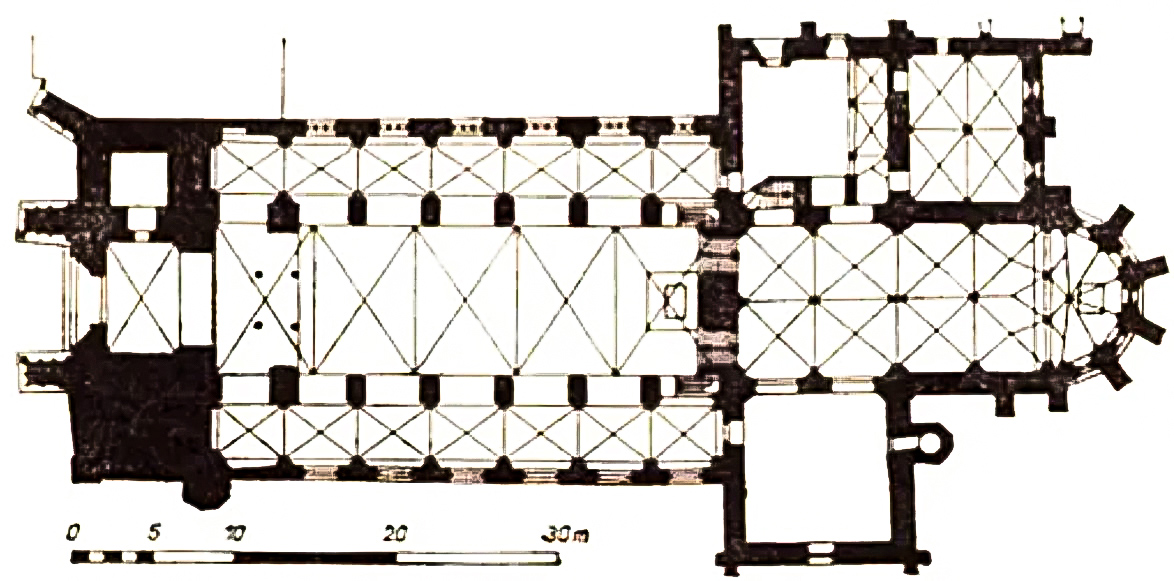
Ground plan

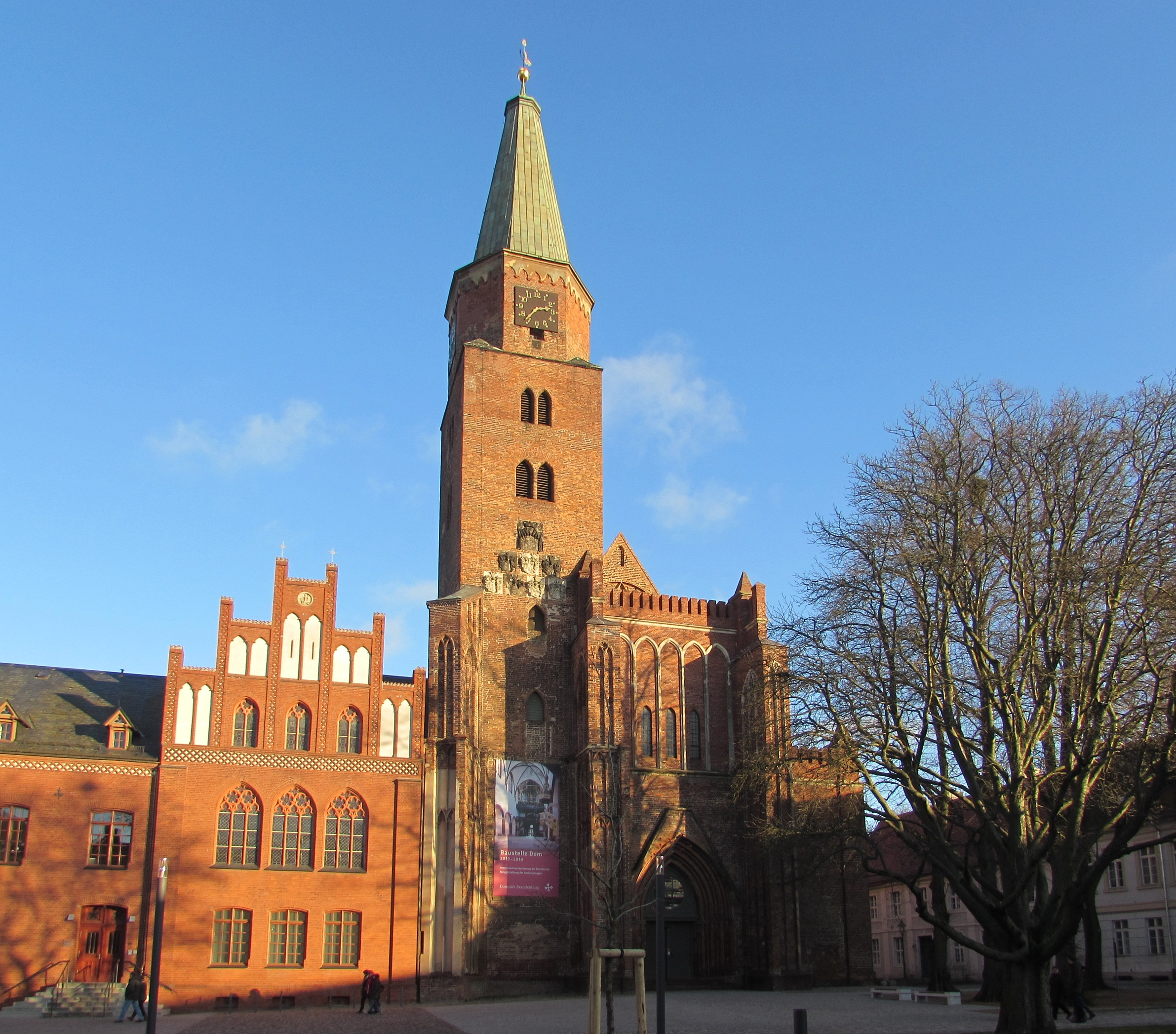
Main front (right)

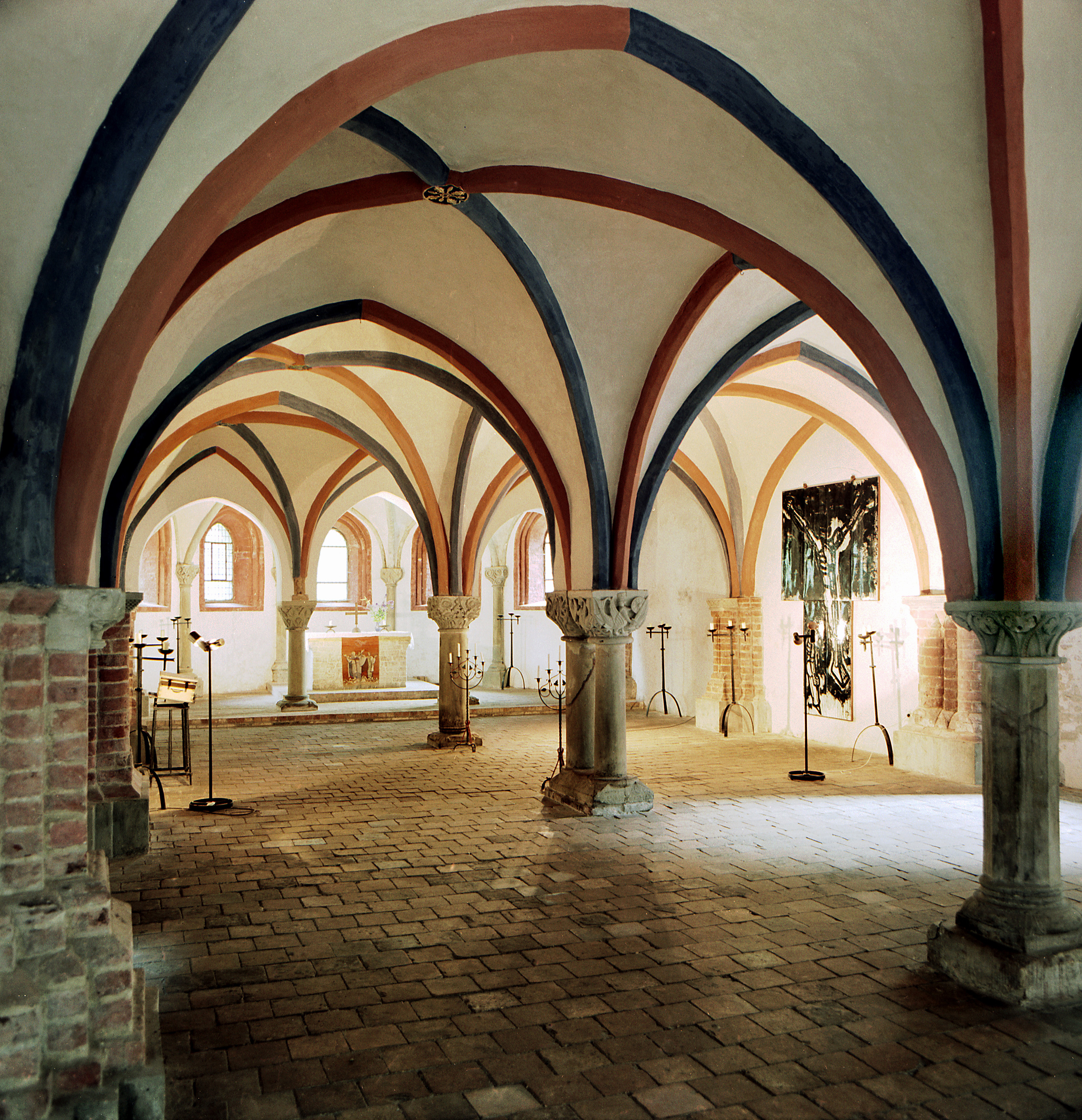
Crypt below the choir

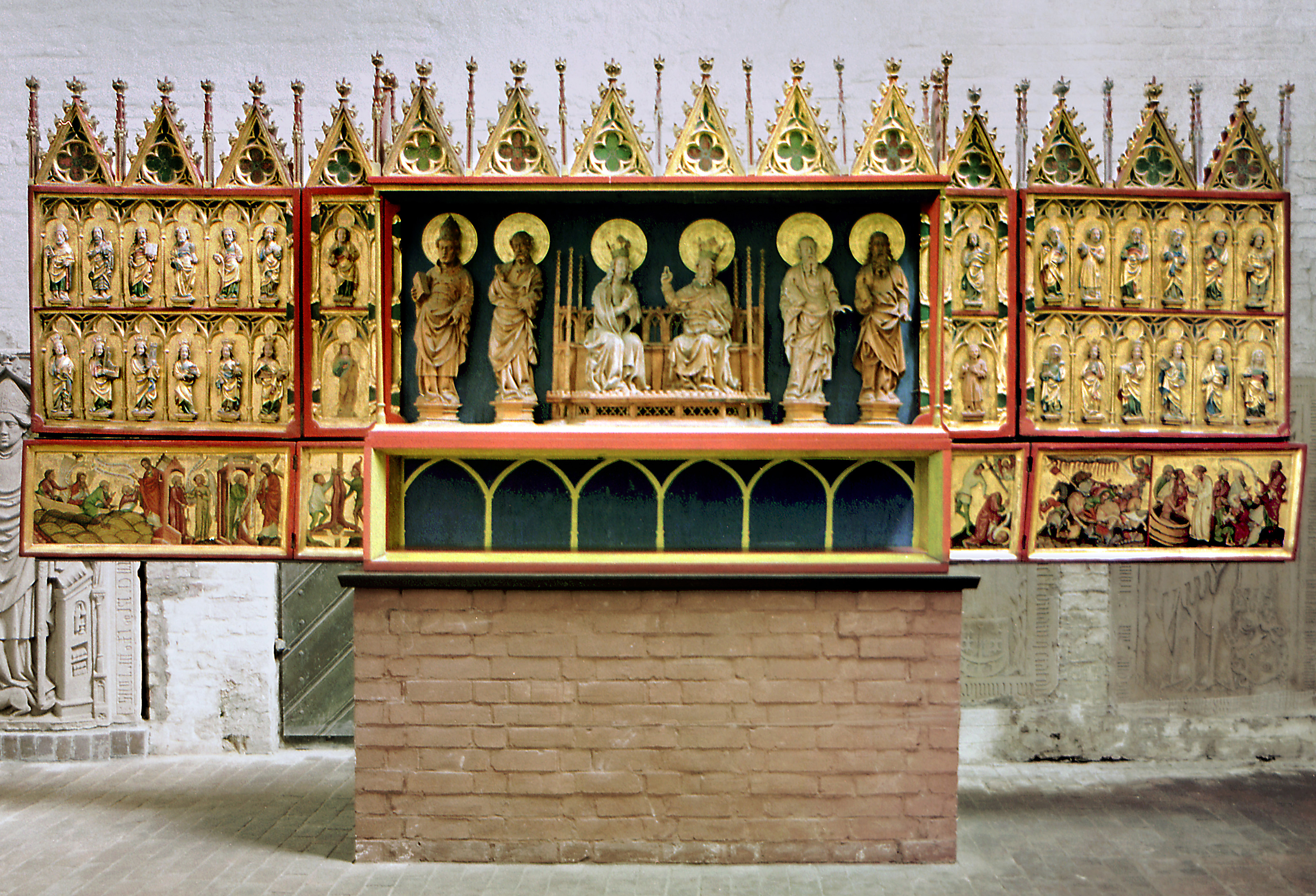
“Bohemian Altar”

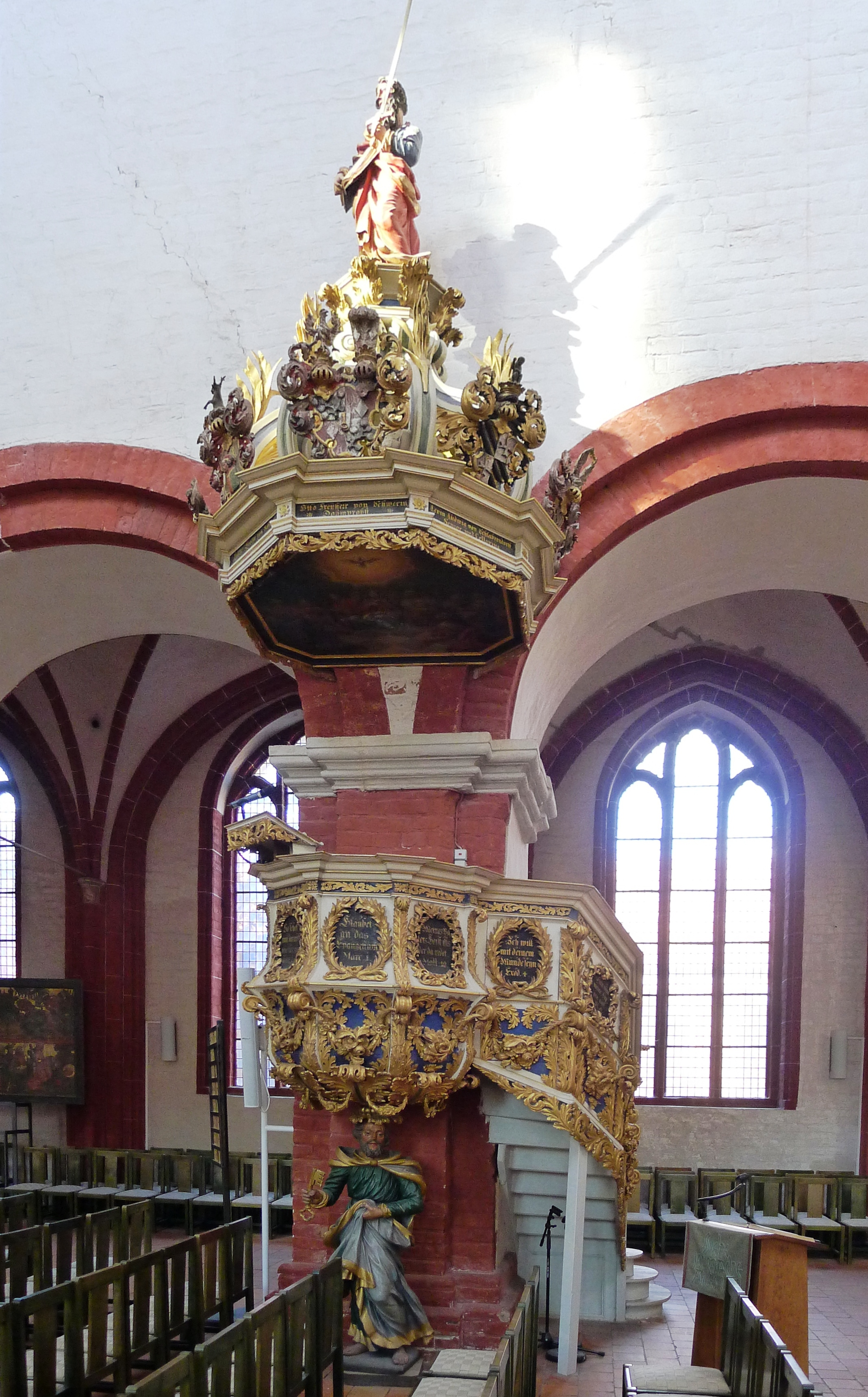
Pulpit

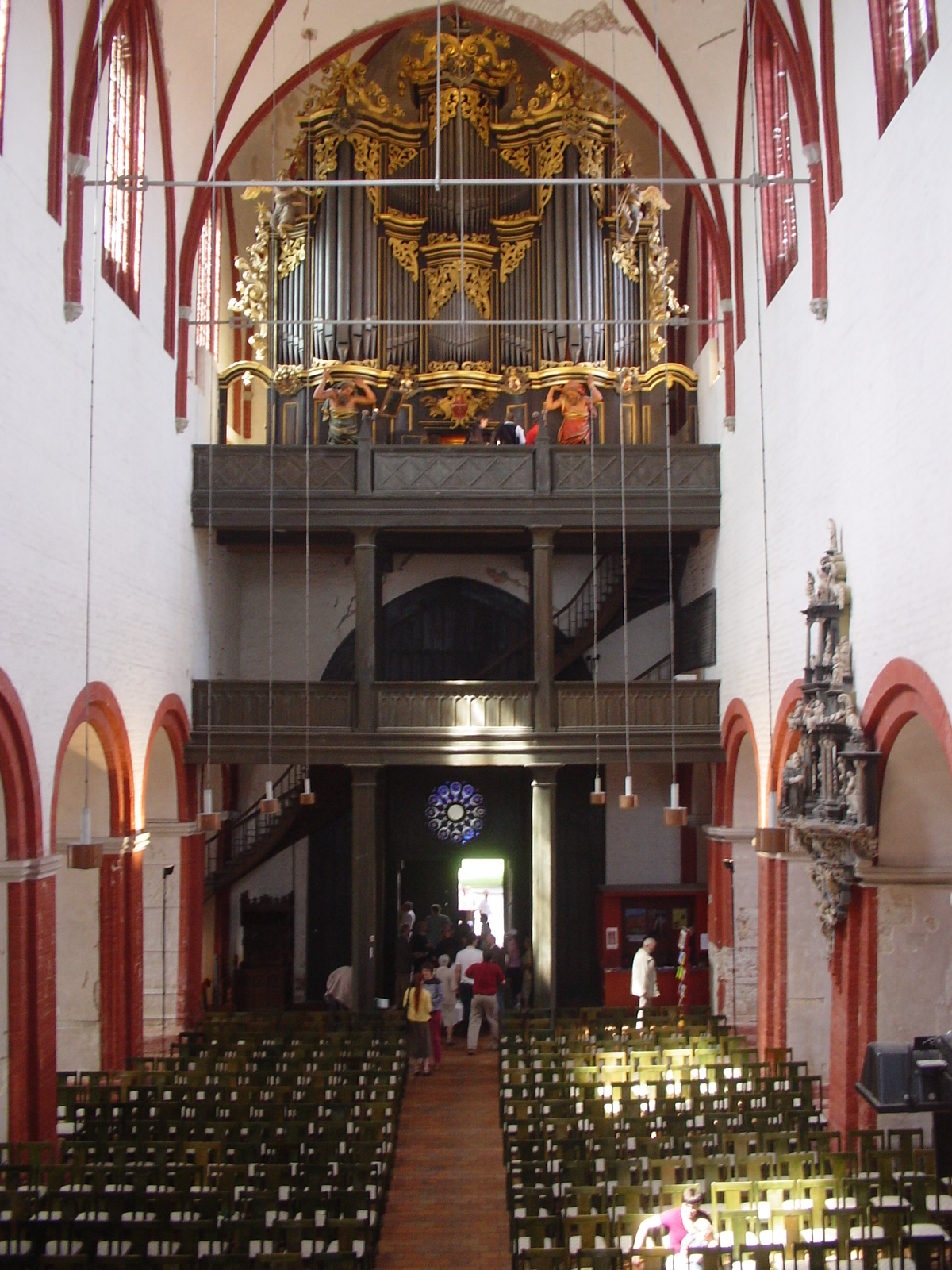
View towards main organ
