= Felix Grüneberg =

German organ builder (1876–1945)

Felix Johannes Erdmann Grüneberg (8 Match 1876 – 15 November 1945) was a German organ builder in Finkenwalde near Stettin.

== Life ==
Born in Szczecin (Stettin), Province of Pomerania, Grüneberg continued the tradition of the family, who had been organ builders in Szczecin since 1782. The father Barnim Grüneberg was the most important organ builder in north-eastern Germany in his time and built or rebuilt about 500 organs. The mother was Clara, née Müller.

Felix learned from his father and took over the management of the workshop at Domstraße 24 in Stettin from about 1905. In 1906, a new organ-building workshop was built in Finkenwalde near Szczecin at Lange Straße 61 (now ul. Batalionów Chłopskich 61), with a large assembly hall, several workshops and a residence, which is the only one of these that has survived to this day.

After the death of his father in 1907, he was the person responsible for organ building. The company initially remained in the possession of his mother Clara Grüneberg, and since 1911 in the possession of his brother Georg. The Orgelbau-Anstalt B. Grüneberg had up to 65 employees and built or rebuilt about 300 organs. Grüneberg was a member of the NSDAP after 1933, but according to his grandson, he saved the lives of some Jewish employees by sending them to work in the villages.

In 1945, the family fled west, the workshop was confiscated, and the factory was demolished in the 1950s. Grüneberg died at the end of the year 1945 in Watenstedt at the age of 69.

The son Barnim Albert Bogislaw Grüneberg (13 April 1914 in Stettin – 24 May 1963 in Munich) learned from his father and in France and was active in the workshop since 1935. Since 1946, he was an organ builder in Greifswald and repaired many organs there, including those of his ancestors, which were thus preserved.
