= Sophienkirche, Berlin =

Coordinates: 52°31′32″N 13°24′00″E

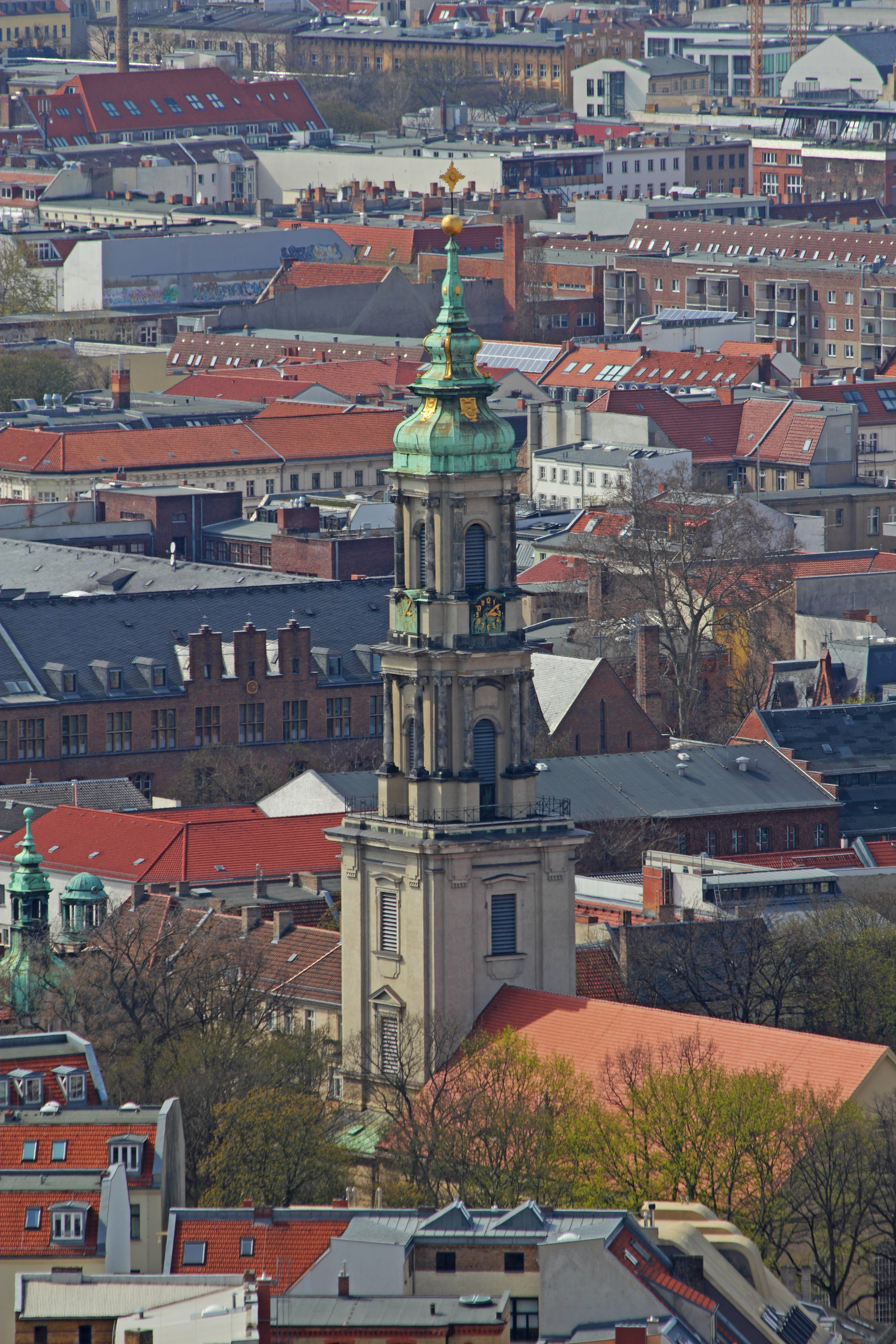
Sophienkirche in Berlin

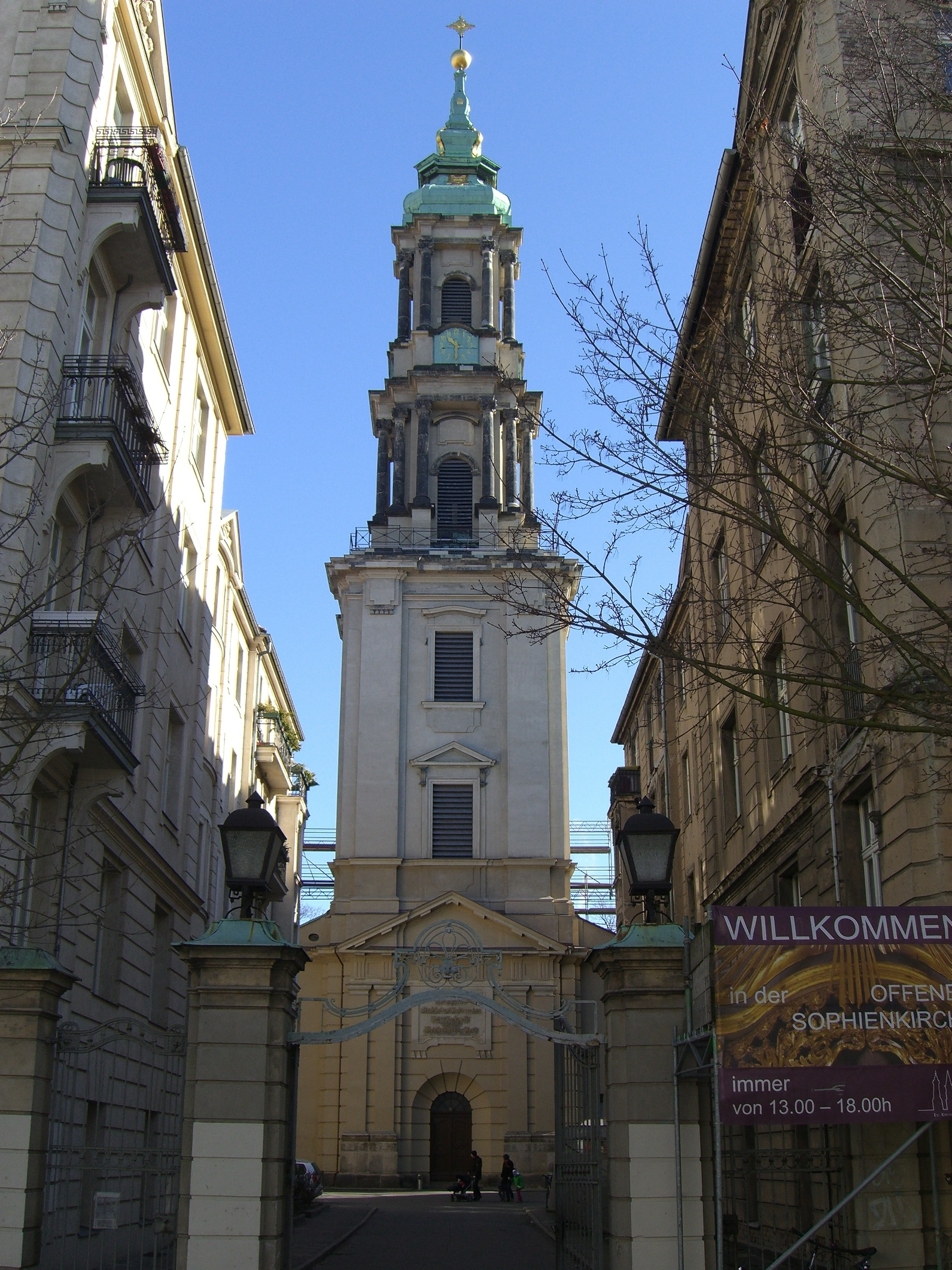
Front view of Sophienkirche

The Sophienkirche is a Protestant church in the Spandauer Vorstadt part of the Berlin-Mitte region of Berlin, eastern Germany. One of its associated cemeteries is the Friedhof II der Sophiengemeinde Berlin.

== History ==
Designed by Philipp Gerlach, its foundation stone was laid by Frederick I of Prussia. After the death of her husband, Frederick's third wife Sophie Luise von Mecklenburg-Schwerin (1685–1735), did not (as originally intended) have the church named after her at the consecration ceremony presided over by Frederick's successor Frederick William I on 25 February 1713. On 18 June 1713, the church was dedicated as the Spandauische Kirche. It was first named after Sophie Luise under his successor Frederick II, and has been called the Sophienkirche ever since.

A baroque tower was added in 1732–1734 by Johann Friedrich Grael.

In 1891–1892, the church was rebuilt to designs by Friedrich Schulze by the practice Kyllmann & Heyden, overseen by Kurt Berndt. The roof was raised and an altar niche added at the east end, and the surviving interior decoration is almost entirely from this restoration.

There is a memorial to the poet Karl Wilhelm Ramler on the outside wall of the church's sacristy and one on the exterior north wall of the church to the poet Anna Luise Karsch.

Prominent graves in the churchyard include those of Carl Friedrich Zelter, founder of the Sing-Akademie zu Berlin, and graves from the last days of the Second World War in the adjacent Sophienstraße.

== Bibliography ==
- Jürgen Boeckh (1986). Alt-Berliner Stadtkirchen Bd. 2. Von der Dorotheenstädtischen Kirche bis zur St.-Hedwigs-Kathedrale (in German). Berlin: Haude und Spener. pp. 84–94. ISBN 978-3-7759-0289-2. OCLC 241868740.
- (in German) Institut für Denkmalpflege (Hg.): Die Bau- und Kunstdenkmale in der DDR. Hauptstadt Berlin I; Henschelverlag: Berlin 2. Aufl. 1984; S. 294–297.
- Kühne, Günther; Stephani, Elisabeth (1978). Evangelische Kirchen in Berlin (in German). Berlin: C.Z.V.-Verlag. pp. 382f. ISBN 3-7674-0158-4. OCLC 5440846.
- Raschke, Thomas (1997). Die Sophienkirche in Berlin [Berlin-Mitte ; Baugeschichte, Kirchhof, Zeittafel, Infos] (in German). Berlin: Homilius. ISBN 978-3-89706-159-0. OCLC 75817800.
