= Georg Friedrich Grüneberg =

German organ builder (1752–1827)

Georg Friedrich Grüneberg (13 December 1752 – 22 October 1827) in Stettin, Pommerania) was a German organ builder in Stettin.

== Life ==
Born in Magdeburg, father Philipp Wilhelm Grüneberg was an organ builder in Magdeburg, since 1767 in Białogard in Pomerania. Georg Friedrich learned from his father, as did his brother Johann Wilhelm Grüneberg, who later became an organ builder in Brandenburg an der Havel. Georg Friedrich Grüneberg was an employee of Johann Gottlieb Mehnert in Stettin from about 1779 and took over his workshop in 1782.

His son August Wilhelm Grüneberg took it over in 1824, and his grandson Barnim Grüneberg made it the most important in the Baltic region.

== Work (selection) ==
Grüneberg is known to have built new organs, changed the disposition, repaired and offered to build new organs. The facade and parts of the organ in Chojnice (Konitz), as well as parts in Poznań.

New organ buildings

Year	Location	Building	Picture	Manual	Stops	Notes
1779–1782	Posen (Poznań)	Kreuzkirche, today Allerheiligenkirche				Altar organ in new church, with Mehnert, 1868 extensive rebuilding by Wilhelm Sauer to II/P, 30, today I/P, 19, facade and parts of organ preserved.
1783	Konitz (Chojnice), Westpreußen	Augustinerklosterkirche		II/P	23	In 1819, Conversion to Annunciation Church, later pneumatic conversion by August Terletzki, In 1947, conversion to St. John's Church, 1954 conversion by Sobiechowski with new facade to II/P, 37, parts of Grüneberg organ preserved
1818	Stettin (Szczecin)	St. Peter and Paul		II/P	24	not preserved
1822	Schwedt	City church				not preserved

Other works

year	Location	Building	Picture	Manuale	Stops	Notes
1767	Belgard (Białogard)	Church				Presumption, during the conversion by Marx
1781	Stettin (Szczecin)	St. Nikolai				Repair, with Mehnert
1782	Stettin	St. Marien				Repair, with Mehnert
1786	Stettin	St. Jacobi				Change of disposition, repairs as early as 1783
1796	Königsberg (Chojna), Neumark	St. Marien				Repairs, then 1811 Repairs offer
1800	Kamień Pomorski, Pommerania	Camminer Dom				Disposition changes and repairs
1804	Driesen (Drezdenko), Neumark	Kirche				Draft facade, whether it was built is not known.
1811	Demmin, Pommern	St. Bartholomaei				Neubau-Angebot, nicht gebaut
1821	Briest	Church				New construction offer, not accepted
