= Christian Gottlieb Richter =

German organ builder (c. 1700–1763)

Christian Gottlieb Richter (c. 1700 – 1763) was a German organ builder who worked mainly in Pomerania and Brandenburg.

== Life ==
Richter was probably a son (or brother) of the organ builder Christian Heinrich Richter in Frankfurt/Oder and Storkow, with whom he jointly signed a repair contract in 1739. In 1730, he was probably the Königl[ich] c[on]c[essionierte] Orgel Bauer in Stettin (or David Richter?). From 1732, he lived in Stralsund, from 1742 in Demmin, from 1744 in Friedland, and in 1757 in Soldin.

Richter created several new organs, including in the St.-Jakobi-Kirche in Stralsund with 42 stops, whose casing has been preserved, as well as repairs and extensions.

The organ builder Simon David Richter was probably a son or other relative, while Christian Joachim Richter probably came from the Storkow family.

== Work (selection) ==
New organ buildings

Year	Location	Building	Picture	Manual	Stopr	Notes
Before 1731	Greifswald	St. Nikolai				Organ positiv as "Interimsinstrument"
1732	Stargard	St. Marien				
1732–1741	Stralsund	St. Jakobi		III/P	42	Organ facade preserved → Orgel
1733	Wolgast	St. Petri				
1742–1744	Friedland, Mecklenburg	St. Marien		II/P	26	With David Baumann
1752–1753	Schwedt	St. Katharinen		II/P	29	
1756–1757	Arensdorf	Dorfkirche Arensdorf				Front preserved
