= Elsey Abbey =

Monastery

Coordinates: 51°21′37″N 7°33′43″E

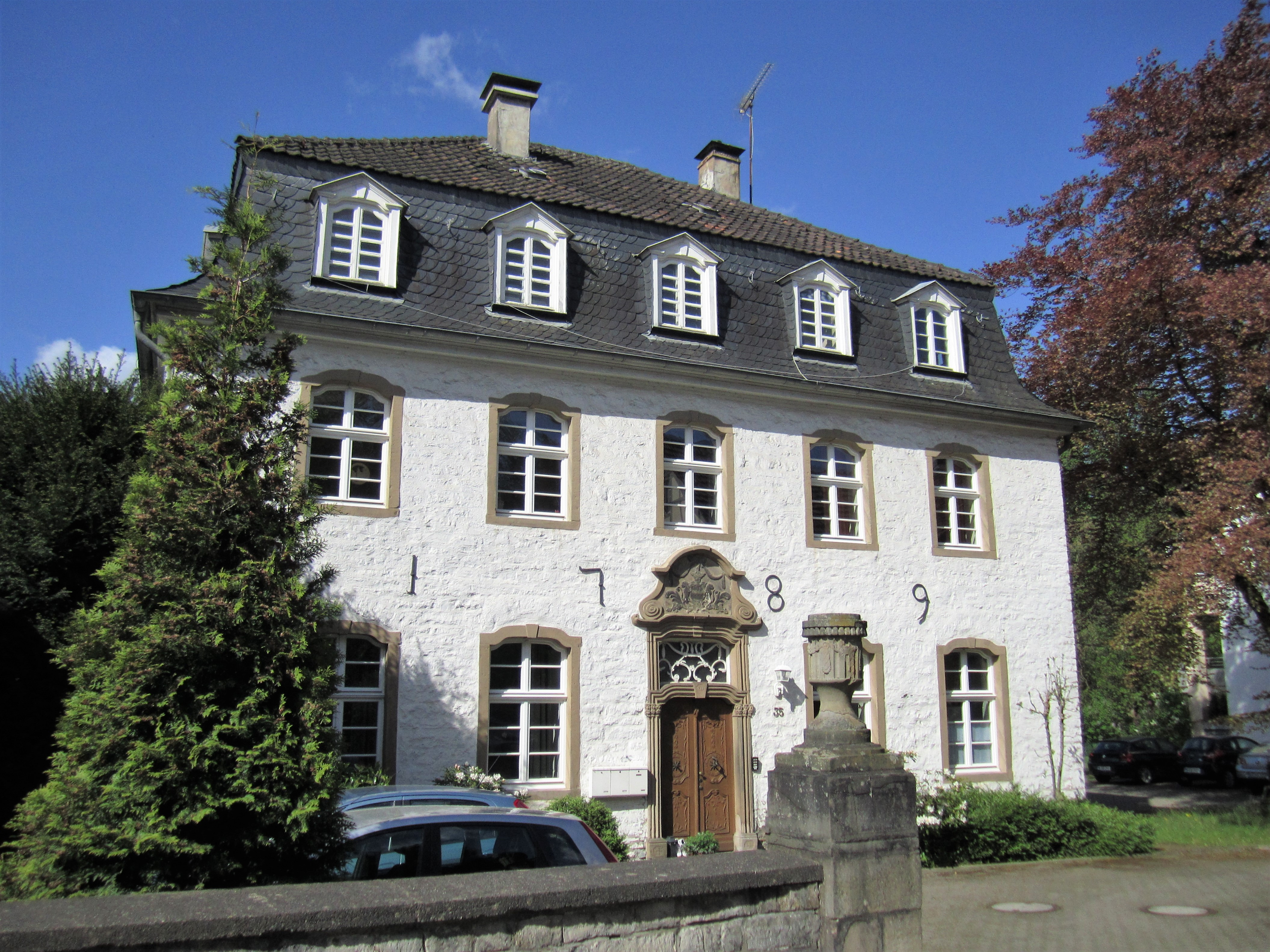
Listed residential building in Hagen-Hohenlimburg (Elsey), Im Stift 35. Built in 1789 in the late rococo style. The quarry stone wall in front of the house with classical pillars crowned by vases. Former curia house of the Elsey Monastery, abbess Amalie Dorothea Elisabeth von dem Bottlenberg's residence. Kessel (term of office 1776–1797).

Elsey Abbey, earlier Elsey Priory (German: Kloster Elsey), is a former women's religious house located near Elsey, now part of Hohenlimburg, Hagen, Germany.

It was founded in about 1220 by Friedrich von Isenberg for Premonstratensian canonesses and endowed with the local parish church and other possessions. In the 15th century, it became a house of secular canonesses of the nobility (a Damenstift) under an abbess. In the 16th century, during the Reformation, the parish became Protestant, and the abbey followed suit in due course.

It was dissolved in 1810, during the secularisation of the period.

There remain the Romanesque church and some of the canonesses' houses.

== Prioresses ==
- Walburgis – c 1270
- Gertrud von Grevel – c 1394)
- Bele Kuling / Kulynges – c 1396
- Katharina Snyders – c 1405
- Else von Eversberg – c 1414
- Regula Dudinck – c 1438

== Abbesses ==
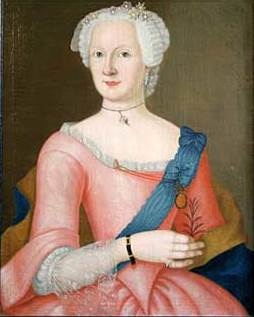
Amalie Dorothea Elisabeth von der Bottlenberg, Lutheran abbess from 1776 to 1797.

- Margaretha von Neuhof / Greyte van Neyenhove – c 1468–1486
- Engela von Holte – c 1501
- Ida von Syberg – 1501–1545
- Sophie Budberg – 1551–1554
- Anna von der Goy – 1556–1577
- Katharina von Neheim – 1590–1595
- Ludger von Neheim known as Dutscher – 1595–1623
- Anna Rump zu Pungelscheid – 1623–1625
- Helene von Plettenberg – 1626–1630
- Gertrud von der Pforten – 1630–1639
- Anna Lucia von Plettenberg – 1639–1640
- Helene von Syberg – 1641–1684
- Elsebein von Lahr- 1684–1696
- Maria Sybilla von Lahr- 1696–1701
- Theodora Anna Katharina von Hauss – 1701–1704
- Sophia Johanna von Bentheim-Tecklenburg – 1704–1716
- Sophie Amelie Dorothee von Bentheim-Tecklenburg- 1716–1753
- Anna Christine Katharina von der Bottlenberg known as Kessel – 1753–1776
- Amalie Dorothea Elisabeth von der Bottlenberg known as Kessel – 1776–1797
- Wilhelmine Sophie von Cornberg- 1797–1802
- Louise von Ledebur- 1802–1803

== Sources ==
- Klueting, E., 1980: Das (freiweltliche) adelige Damenstift Elsey. Geschichte, Verfassung und Grundherrschaft in Spätmittelalter und Frühneuzeit. Freunde der Burg Altena: Altena 1980 Altenaer Beiträge 14 – Freunde der Burg Altena: Altena ISSN 0516-8260 (also: Bochum, Ruhr-Univ., Dissertation 1976)
