= Gottlieb Scholtze =

German organ builder (1713–1783)

Gottlieb Scholtze (1713 – 6 April 1783) was a German pipe organ builder. He had his workshop in Neuruppin since 1740. He was a pupil of Joachim Wagner. Along with Ernst Julius Marx and Johann Wilhelm Grüneberg, he is considered the most important organ builder in the Mark Brandenburg in the second half of the 18th century. A total of 32 new buildings are recorded by him, including the organ of the parish church in Küstrin.

== Organ Buildings (selection) ==
| Year | Location | Building | Picture | Manual | Casing | Notes |
|---|---|---|---|---|---|---|
| 1749 | Groß Schönebeck | Immanuelkirche | | I/P | 16 | Restored in 2009 by Alexander Schuke Potsdam Orgelbau |
| 1754 | Havelberg | Stadtkirche St. Laurentius | | II/P | 32 | In 2014, a sponsoring association was founded in order to be able to restore the Scholtze organ, which is currently not playable. |
| 1756 | Vehlefanz | Dorfkirche Vehlefanz | | | | |
| 1759 | Lenzen (Elbe) | St. Katharinen, reconstruction. | | II/P | 27 | Restored in 2007 by Reinhard Hüfken and restored to its original condition. Contains pipe material from the predecessor organs by Hans Scherer der Jüngere (1627/1628) and by Arp Schnitger (1707/1708) |
| 1760 | Plessow | Dorfkirche Plessow | | I | 9 | Restored in 2000. |
| 1764 | Schmetzdorf | Dorfkirche Schmetzdorf | | | | |
| 1764 | Zollchow bei Milow | Dorfkirche Zollchow | | I/P | 9 | New organ built around 1860 by Lütkemüller, casing and four stops by Scholtze preserved. |
| 1765 | Kotzen (Havelland) | Dorfkirche Kotzen | | | | |
| 1767 | Rheinsberg | St. Laurentius | | I/P | 13 | Rebuilt several times, casing and some stops preserved |
| 1769 | Templin | Sankt-Maria-Magdalena-Kirche | | II/P | 27 | Casing preserved |
| 1770 | Schönhausen (Elbe) | Dorfkirche St. Marien und Willebrord | | I/P | 14 | Restoration and reconstruction of the original state in 2010 by Orgelbau Reinhard Hüfken |
| 1772 | Fürstenwalde/Spree | St Mary's Cathedral, Fürstenwalde | | | | Destroyed in April 1945 |
| 1772 | Müllrose | Kirche Müllrose | | | | Donated; casing preserved. |
| 1775 | Seedorf (Lenzen) | Village church | | I/p | 8 | Preserved |
| 1777 | Havelberg | Cathedral | | II/P | 34 | →Orgel |
