= Christian Gottlob Höpner =

German composer, organist and music educator

Christian Gottlob Höpner, also Hoepner (7 November 1799 – 26 October 1859) was a German composer, organist and music educator.

== Life and career ==
Born in Frankenberg, Höpner grew up in the family of a weaver in Frankenberg near Chemnitz, and he acquired his first musical knowledge by self-taught means. At the age of 14, he could already play the piano by listening to pianoforte lessons given by his older brother. At the age of 17, Höpner also wanted to learn to play the organ. He found the opportunity to do so after attending Sunday services by using the organ in the Frankenberg church. From the wages he received after his apprenticeship as a journeyman weaver, Höpner bought musical textbooks, practised independently on a small organ and attempted compositions. He presented these compositions in 1824 to the cantor August Ferdinand Anacker (1790–1854) in Freiberg for review. The verdict was so encouraging that in 1827 Höpner applied to the court conductor Johann Nepomuk Hummel (1778–1837) in Weimar, who advised him to devote himself entirely to music. Höpner moved to Dresden, where from 1827 he was professionally taught by Johann Gottlob Schneider junior (1789–1864) for four years, when he was organist at the Dresdner Hofkirche. He himself was organist at the Kreuzkirche in Dresden from 1837 to 1859.

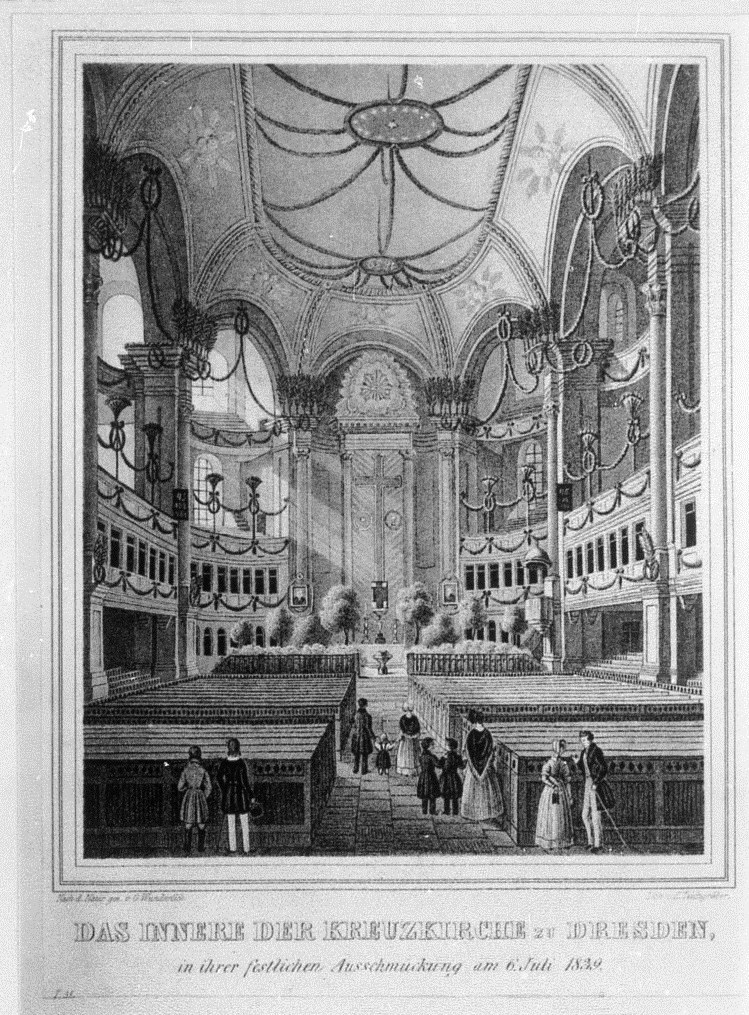
The interior of the Kreuzkirche Dresden in 1839 (Lithograph by Heinrich Wilhelm Teichgräber)

Höpner worked in his leisure hours on the journal Neues vollständiges Museum für die Orgel. This was intended for use in the training and further education of organists and was published by an "association of excellent organ composers". The journal was published by Friedrich Wilhelm Goedsche in Meißen. With organ compositions, for example his composition "Praeludium et Fuga", Höpner participated around 1847 in a "Hand- und Musterbuch", which was intended both for the study of organ music and for church service use. In addition, the church music collection was intended for all organ lovers.

=== The Kreuzorganist's view of the "pliability of the organ tone" ===
After Höpner's work Zehn Adagio im freien Stil für die Orgel komponiert was published by the Dresden publishing house Arnold and reviewed in the Neue Zeitschrift für Musik by Oswald Lorenz (1806–1889) under his pseudonym Hans Grobgedakt, a public dispute developed between the two composers. The focus was on the question of the "pliability of organ tone by the organ builder or organ player". It was discussed against the background that "Crescendo and Decrescendo" were musical means to "promote the Anglican devotions".

Referring to the organist and music director Christian Friedrich Gottlieb Wilke (1769–1848), Höpner answered the question in the affirmative, quoting him in his "rebuttal" with the statement: "...organ building has now risen so high that there is hardly more left than the one wish to be able to give the organ tone a bend."

In the main question of "pliability of the organ tone" in the subject of "organ tone and organ playing", the musicologist Eduard Krüger (1807–1885) from Emden took sides with Lorenz alias Grobgedakt.

=== Burial at Dresdner Trinitatisfriedhof ===
In 1859, the newspaper Dresdner Nachrichten promptly announced that the organist Höpner had died in Dresden, and in another message the age at death (59) as well as the burial at the Trinitatisfriedriedhof was announced. As organist at the Kreuzkirche, C. G. Höpner is entered for the last time in the Dresden address book for 1859. His son Emil Robert Höpner (1846–1903) also became an organist and worked at the Dresden Kreuzkirche from 1885 to 1902.

The organist and composer Gustav Merkel was appointed as C. G. Höpner's immediate successor at the Kreuzkirche.

=== Dedications ===
Höpner dedicated his Acht Vorspiele mit eingewebten Choralmelodien und zwei Fugen für die Orgel, to his teacher, the Royal Saxon court organist Johann Schneider (1789–1864), which were published in 1830 by the Dresden publishing house of Meser'sche Kunst- und Musikalien-Handlung.

He received the same honour when one of his friends, the organist Carl Geissler (1802–1869) dedicated to him eight Organ Preludes of Various Character for the Further Education of Organists and for Use in Public Worship. They were published in 1838 by the music publisher Friedrich Hofmeister in Leipzig.

The music historian Gotthold Frotscher (1897–1968) paid tribute to the chorale works of the "Dresden Kreuzkirche organist Christian Gottlob Hoepner" and highlighted the latter's "sense of sustained melodicism" in his "free pieces".

== Compositions ==
- Op. 2 Acht Vorspiele und zwei Fugen
- Op. 5 Phantasie Es-Dur
- Op. 9 Einleitung und Fuge für Orgel zu 4 Händen
- Op. 10 Neun ausgeführte Choräle
- Op. 11 Zehn Adagios im freieren Stil
- Op. 12 Sechs Orgelstücke
- Op. 14 34 Orgelstücke
- Op. 19 Vier variierte Choräle zu vier Händen; Op. 19 I on "Nun ruhen alle Wälder"
- Op. 20 Adagio A-Dur
- Op. 21 Drei variierte Choräle und zwei Fugen
- Präludium und Fuge A-Moll
