= Christian Friedrich Gottlieb Wilke =

German organist and composer

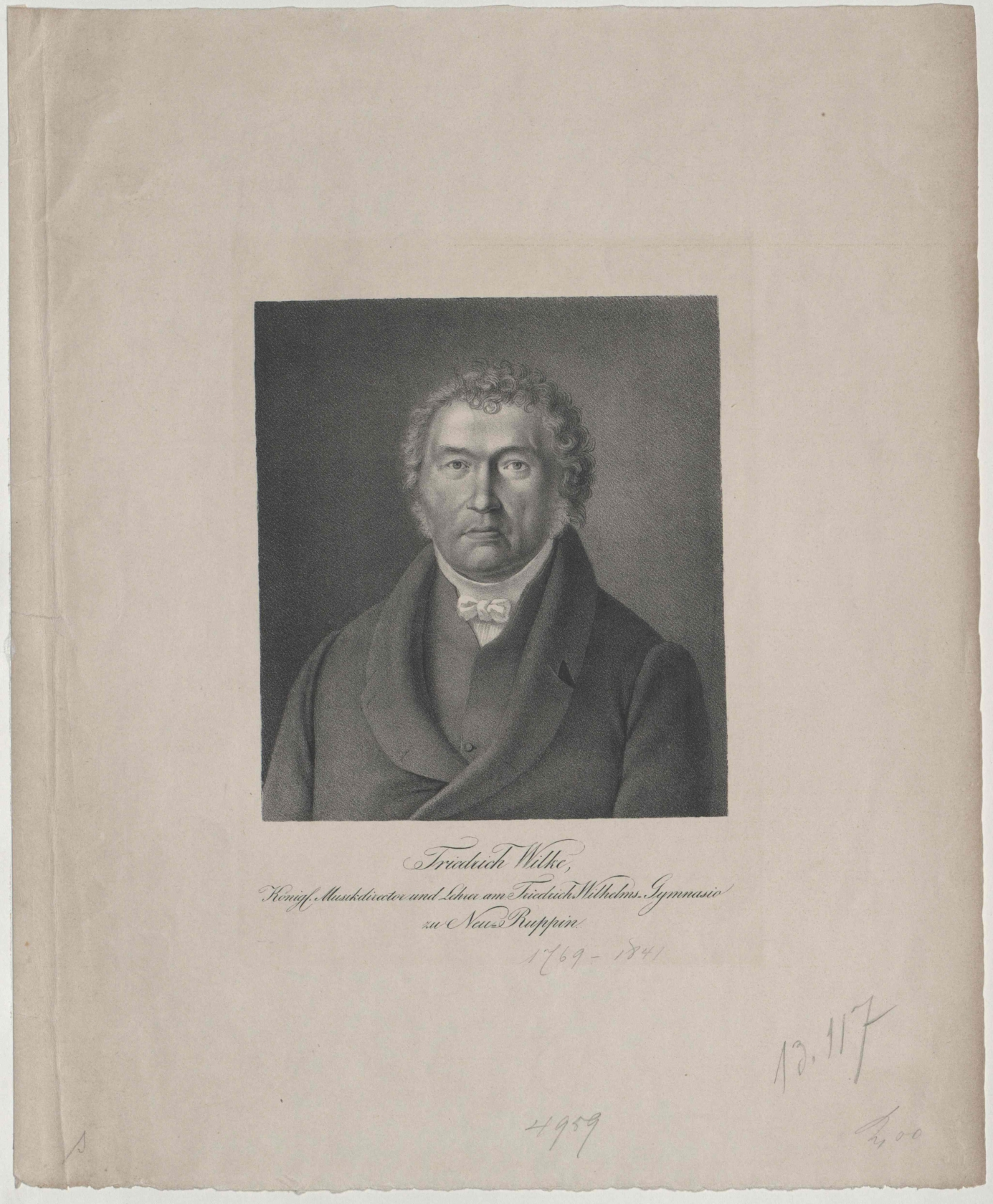
Christian Friedrich Gottlieb Wilke

Christian Friedrich Gottlob Wilke (13 March 1769 – 31 July 1848) was a German organist, composer, music teacher, music writer and organ revisor.

== Life and career ==
=== Education ===
Born in Spandau, Wilke received his first music lessons from his father, a teacher in Spandau. Later, the Spandau organist and singer bass Heinrich Neumann taught the then eight-year-old to play the organ. At the age of ten he was already occasionally playing the organ in the church of Spandau on Sundays, and later in Charlottenburg.

Since he was to study evangelical theology according to his father's wishes, he attended the Rittercollegium (Domgymnasium) in Brandenburg from the age of 13. In accordance with his musical inclination, he exerted himself above all in the music lessons of the teacher and Brandenburg organist of the St. Gotthardt Church Michael Ehregott Grose (1747–1795) and received private lessons from him on the organ and in continuo. He distinguished himself by participating in concerts of the Rittercollegium, especially as a pianist. In his spare time he attended the workshop of the organ builder Johann Wilhelm Grüneberg (1751–1808).

After three years in Brandenburg, Wilke moved to the Evangelisches Gymnasium zum Grauen Kloster in Berlin. His interest in organ building intensified through visits to organ workshops, for example the organ builders Carl August Buchholz (1796–1806) and Ernst Julius Marx (1728–1799). In addition, he attended concerts, partly as a listener and partly as a participant, and studied books on musical art and organ building on his own. Through mediation he received lessons in musical composition from Christian Kalkbrenner (1755–1806), the Kapellmeister of the Prussian Queen.

=== Organist and teacher ===
On 27 July 1791, Wilke took up his first post as organist in Spandau. He also gave private music lessons. After Prussia's defeat by France in 1806, his position was cancelled and he had to live – now in Charlottenburg – solely on his income as a private teacher.

From 1 December 1809, he was music teacher at the Friedrich-Wilhelms-Gymnasium in Neuruppin as well as cantor and organist at both churches in the town, the Pfarrkirche St. Marien and the Klosterkirche St. Trinitatis.

=== Freemason ===
In Neuruppin, Wilke initiated the founding of a masonic lodge in 1811, which was then officially opened in 1812 under the name Ferdinand zum Rothen Adler. Wilke had declined to take on the office of Worshipful Master, but was deputised (deputy) Master from 1813 and very active in lodge work in general. From 1834 to 1838, he was still Master of the Chair, but according to the chronicler he was already too old and too weak for the leadership of the Lodge. Already in this year, he fell ill for a long time, had to take a trip to the baths, lost his wife in the following year and thus fell more and more ill, both physically and mentally. In 1838, he was then appointed Honorary Master and in 1842 also Honorary Member of the friendly Lodge "Constantia" in Kyritz.

=== Music writer and organ reviewer ===
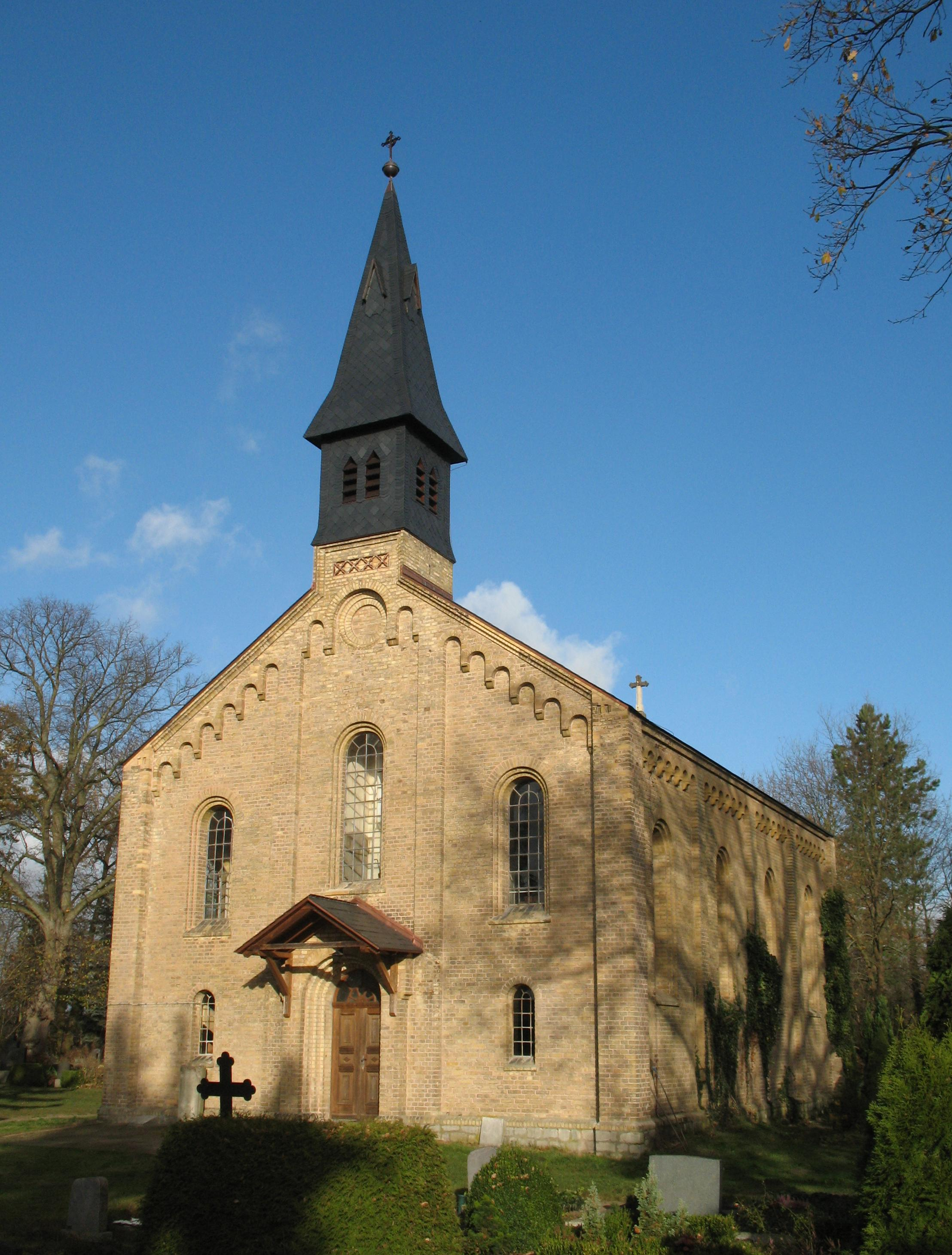
Hohenburch church

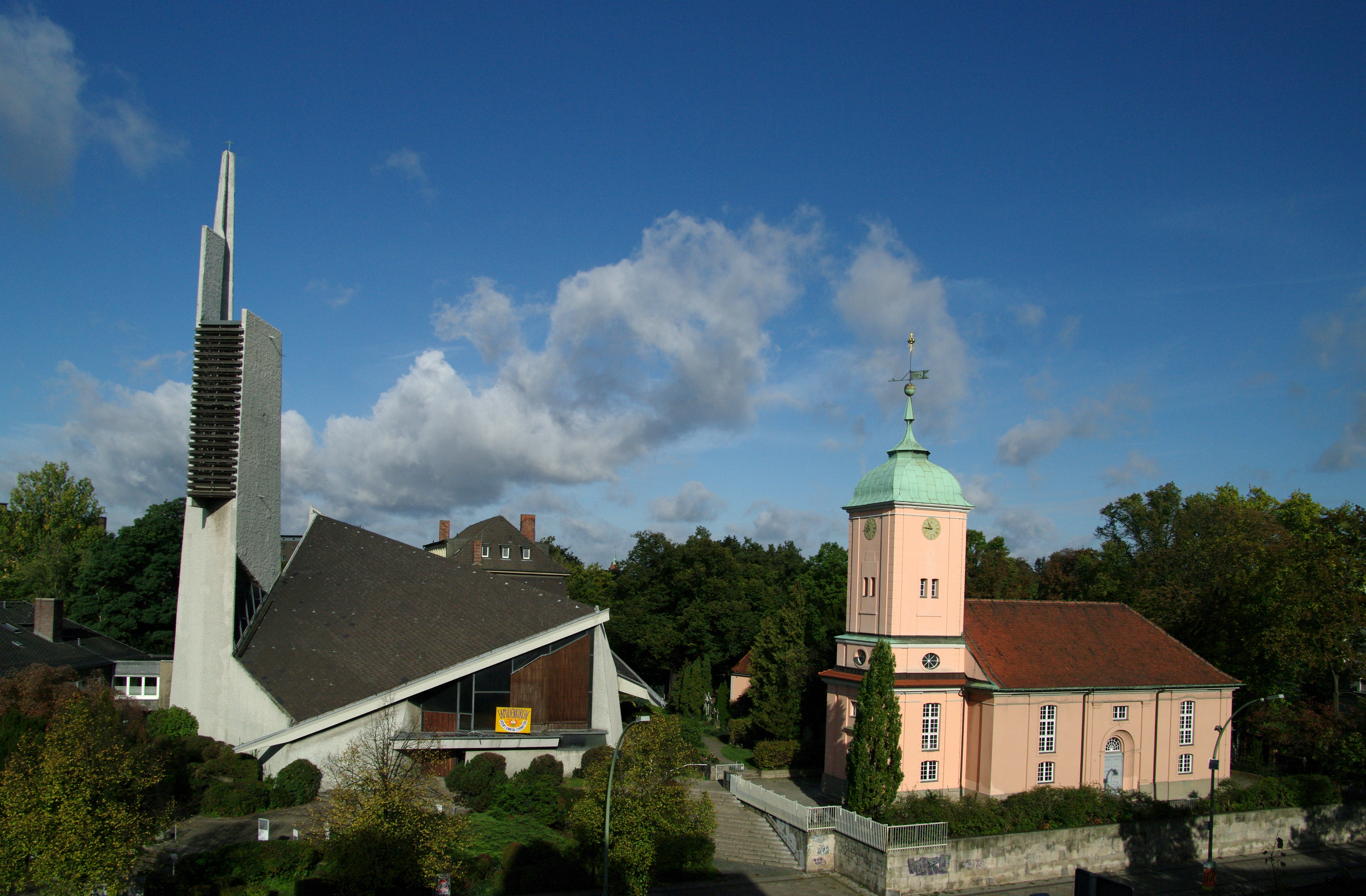
Schoeneberg old village church and paul gerhardt kirche 12.10.2011 09-50-35

Wilke began his publishing career in 1811 with a description of the organ in the parish church at Neuruppin, but afterwards also published a Leitfaden zum praktischen Gesang-Unterricht (Berlin 1812) and in 1816 an article Ueber den jetzigen Verfall des Kirchengesanges, und über seine Verbesserung. Es folgten viele weitere Beiträge, überwiegend zu Fragen des Orgelbaus (s. u.).

Soon he was also involved as an expert in the acceptance of newly built organs; for example, he was revisor of the organ built in 1816 by Johann Tobias Turley (1773–1829) from Treuenbrietzen in Hohenbruch and in 1821, together with government building inspector Salomo Sachs appraiser of the organ from Buchholz & Sohn in the village church of Schöneberg. As inspector (Commissarius / Revisor) in organ building matters he was sworn in by the royal government in Potsdam, and on 24. On August 24, 1821, the government announced that through the active and tireless cooperation of the artistically competent Mr. Wilke, several important organs had been built in recent years, and that his advice should therefore be sought before submitting an application for the purchase of organs.

However, due to the preference given to the self-taught baker Turley, who had become an organ builder, and the neglect of regularly trained organ builders (such as Friedrich Emanuel Marx and Gottlieb Heise), complaints against Wilke became increasingly loud, eventually led by Carl Friedrich Zelter and August Wilhelm Bach, the directors of the Royal Music Institute of Berlin, founded in 1822. As a result, in 1825 the Prussian minister of culture Karl vom Stein zum Altenstein forbade the government in Potsdam from continuing to entrust Wilke with revisions and appointed Bach as Commissarius for Organ Affairs in the Kgl. Oberbaudeputation. Wilke now had to seek clients for organ revisions among the municipal magistrates in more remote regions of Prussia (Altmark and Silesia) as well as in neighbouring countries (Mecklenburg and Anhalt). In doing so, he then also collaborated several times with Friedrich Turley, the son and successor of Tobias Turley.

After the construction of the large organ in the Marienkirche in Wismar from 1839 to 1841, which partly deviated from his design, Wilke got into fierce disputes with other organ experts (including Bach) and also with the organist in Neubrandenburg after two revisions (1841 and 1843). These disputes, which were persistently carried out in journals and pamphlets, lasted until the end of his life – a Letztes Wort des Musikdirektors Wilke über die Bau-Angelegenheiten der Orgeln zu Wismar und Neubrandenburg, und die daraus hervorgegangenen bösartigen Veröffentlichungen, mit denen derselbe von den Organisten Baake zu Halberstadt und Gerlach zu Neubrandenburg, seit einigen Jahren, und zwar noch bis jetzt verfolgt wurde was published shortly before his death.

=== Inventor ===
Wilke invented an instrument for tuning the piano and called it Octochord The improvement of the invention of the Rohrwerke mit durchschlagenden Zungen in organ pipes and the identification of all related inventors also goes back to him. A "compensation mixture" invented by Wilke was subsequently installed in the organ of St. Marien in Wismar on the basis of an additional agreement between the music director and the organ builder Schulze with the necessary pipes.

=== Honours ===
- Appointment as music director on 12 March 1821.
- Awarded the Great Gold Medal for Art and Science in 1830 by King Frederick William IV of Prussia in recognition of his Composition with Harmony Accompaniment, which was publicly performed by a choir of 120 singers and numerous instrumentalists under Wilke's direction on 26 August 1829 at the dedication of the monument to King Frederick William II of Prussia designed by Karl Friedrich Schinkel and created by Christian Friedrich Tieck. He also composed other cantatas, motets and other church music; he donated the proceeds from his concerts to impecunious inhabitants of the respective venue or poor schoolchildren.
- Honorary membership in the German National Association for Music and its Science (under the presidency of Louis Spohr) in 1839.
- Written, honourable acknowledgements of work for youth as well as for art and science by authorities and by King Frederick William IV of Prussia – according to his own statement.
- Award of the Order of the Red Eagle IV Class on the occasion of his retirement in 1845.

=== 50th anniversary of service ===
On 27 July 1841, Wilke celebrated his 50th anniversary of service in Neuruppin. Tributes to the jubilarian were paid by the city and the citizenry, including. Among other things, with a banquet and an evening fireworks display. Festive music was provided by the garrison choir and an external military orchestra. Among the well-wishers were a delegation from the city of Spandau and other guests of honour such as the composer Gottfried Wilhelm Fink (1783–1846), who had composed a song for the jubilarian. Also present were the district administrator of the Ruppinscher Kreis Friedrich Graf von Zieten (1765–1854), the composer Friedrich Johann von Drieberg (1780–1856) and some of Wilke's former pupils, including the organist and composer David Hermann Engel (1816–1877), to whom he had given his first organ lessons.

=== Pensioner in Treuenbrietzen ===
After his retirement in 1845, Wilke moved in with his foster daughter in Treuenbrietzen. She had married a merchant there in 1844. However, the close relative died before him at the beginning of 1847.

During his lifetime, Wilke donated his music library to the Potsdam schoolteachers' seminary, and in his will he donated 4000 Rth. to supplement the salary of his successors in office.

In the biographical-genealogical reference work Eduard Maria Oettinger's Moniteur des Dates of 1868, Wilke's occupation was listed as "organist", the exact date of birth and death, as well as "Karl Friedrich" as his first name, in addition to his last place of residence. Already in the necrology for him, it said about his person: "K. F. G. Wilke" – overlooked was probably the correction made shortly afterwards by the author, who apologised with the poor handwriting of his source and clarified: "Wilke's baptismal names are Christian Friedrich Gottlob".

Wilke died in Treuenbrietzen at the age of 79.

== Publications ==
Wilke was a correspondent for the Leipzig Allgemeine musikalische Zeitung, and also wrote articles for the Caecilia, eine Zeitschrift für die musikalische Welt (edited by Gottfried Weber), as well as for the Berliner allgemeine musikalische Zeitung (edited by Adolf Bernhard Marx). He also wrote a number of specialist books.

- The organ in Neuruppin .... In: Allgemeine Musikalische Zeitung, No. 13 of 27 March 1811, columns 217–224; continued ibid. in No. 14 of 3 April 1811, columns 231–239
- Leitfaden zum praktischen Gesangsunterrichte für Elementarschulen, besonders auf dem Lande. Verlag Maurer, Berlin 1812.
- Remarks on organ building, namely organ bellows. With a postscript by Gottfried Weber. In Caecilia, 1830, issue 48, pp. 263–274
- Beschreibung einer in der Kirche zu Perleberg im Jahre 1831 aufgestellten neuen Orgel [mit der Abbildung der Orgel von Friedrich Turley]. Publisher Buch- und Musikalienhandlung Oehmigke & Riemschneider, Neu-Ruppin/Gransee 1832.
- Description of the St. Catharine Church organ in the new town at Salzwedel ... [by Friedrich Turley, 1838]. Trautwein Publishing House, Berlin 1839.
- On the importance and indispensability of organ mixtures ... . Berlin 1839.
- Appreciation of a missive of the organist C. Gerlach ... . Hamburg/Leipzig 1846.

He also wrote the organ articles for Gustav Schilling's Encyclopädie der gesammten musikalischen Wissenschaften oder Universal-Lexicon der Tonkunst, on which, for example, the Dresden cross organist Christian Gottlob Höpner (1799–1859) referred to in a public dispute about the "flexibility of the organ tone".

Wilke's views on organ building were not shared by all his contemporaries, e.g. communicated by the cathedral organist in Halberstadt Ferdinand Baake (1800–1881) in Beschreibung der großen Orgel der Marienkirche zu Wismar sowie der großen Halberstadt Cathedral und der St. Martinikirche zu Halberstadt. A contribution to the illumination and appreciation of the peculiar views and principles of Herr Musikdirektor Wilke zu Neu-Ruppin in relation to the art of organ building. This publication was preceded by an Open missive to Messrs Musik-Direktor W. Bach in Berlin, organist Baake in Halberstadt and organist Friese in Wismar, concerning the organ to be installed in the St. Marienkirche zu Wismar, and the achievements of the organ builder Mr Schulze from Paulinzella, in organ building, which Wilke wrote under his title "Music Director in Neu-Ruppin" for the new organ building from 1839 to 1841 had written. The Urania, a "musikalische Zeitschrift zur Belehrung und Unterhaltung für Deutschlands Organisten" (musical journal for instruction and entertainment for Germany's organists), summarised the dispute in 1847 under the heading "Kämpfe auf dem Gebiet der Orgelbaukunst" (battles in the field of organ building).
