= Johann Tobias Turley =

German organ builder (1773–1829)

Johann Tobias Turley, also Thurley (4 August 1773 – 9 April 1829), was a German organ builder based in Brandenburg.

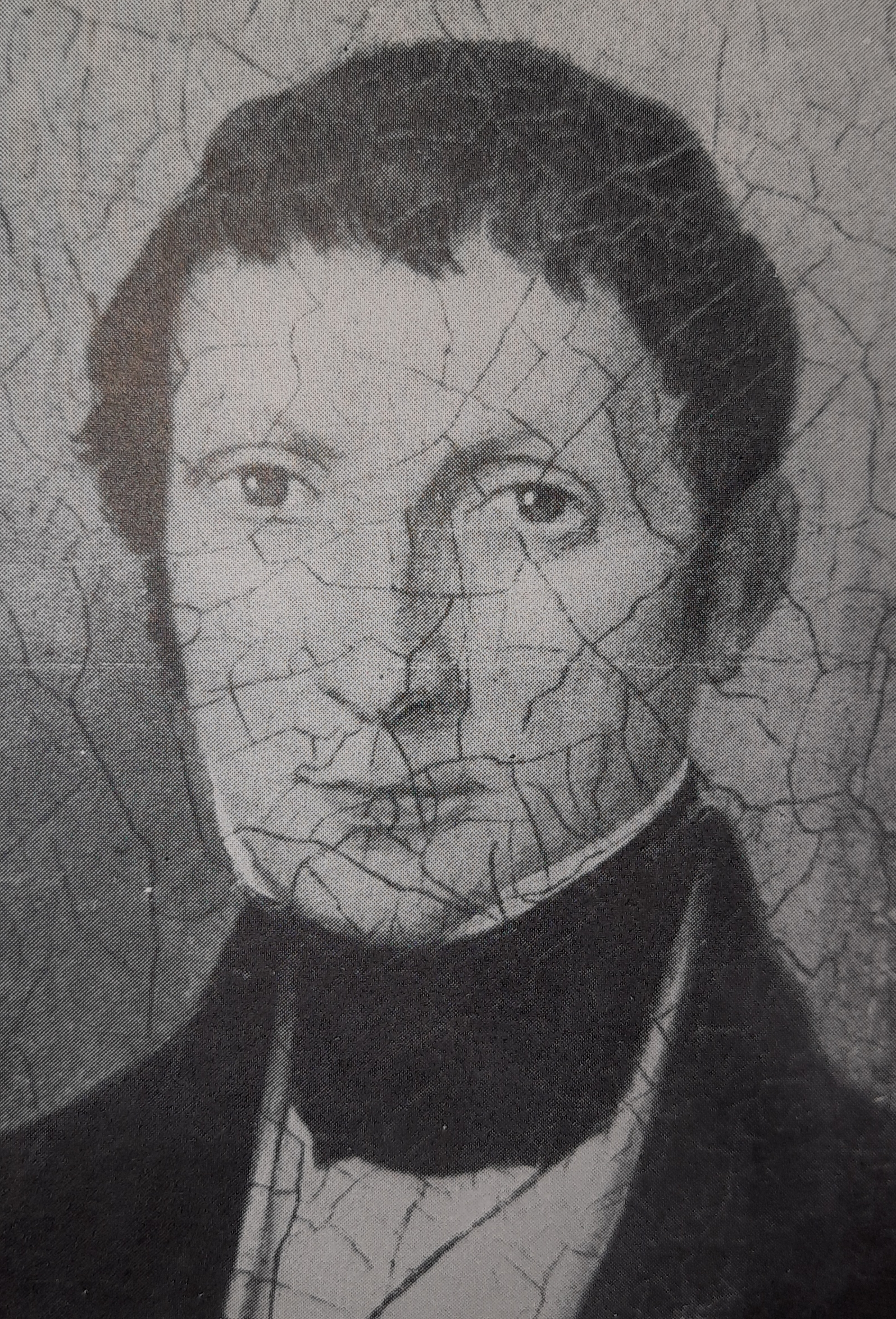
Presumed portrait of Johann Tobias Turley.

== Life ==
Turley was born in Treuenbrietzen as the son of the baker Johann Friedrich Turley (1728–1783). After the early death of his father, he learned the same trade at the request of his mother. In 1793, he became a citizen and master baker in Treuenbrietzen. Turley was self-taught in organ building and in 1796 created a first organ in the Dorfkirche in Brachwitz.

In 1814, he gave up the baker's trade and turned entirely to organ building. From 1816 onwards, he received his first orders from the Potsdam government, such as for Hohenbruch. The organ expert and organist in Neuruppin Christian Friedrich Gottlieb Wilke advised him to give the metal plates for the organ pipes equal surfaces by means of a rolling and stretching machine to be developed. Turley invented a corresponding rolling machine for the production of pipes and had it manufactured by the Königlich Preußische Eisengießerei in Berlin. He first used the invention in his organ buildings in the Kreuzkirche in Joachimsthal and in Blankenburg (1817).

Turley was married twice. On 31 October 1793, he married Maria Louise Bergmann from Treuenbrietzen, who died in 1808. His second wife was Marie Elisabeth Plötz, a divorced tailor's daughter from Wittbrietzen, whom he married on 4 May 1809.

His son Johann Friedrich Turley II. learned organ building from his father and assisted him in the last years of his life.

Turley died in Treuenbrietzen at the age of 55.

== Selected works ==
Turley is said to have built 20 organs and carried out 30 repairs. Some new constructions have been preserved. Instruments that no longer exist are set in italics.

New organ buildings

Year	Location	Building	Picture	Manual	Casing	Notes
1796	Brachwitz	Dorfkirche				First new organ
1813	Päwesin	Dorfkirche		I/P	8	Based on headmaster 4', extended in 1854 by Gesell to I/P, 9, restored in 1983 by Ulrich Fahlberg. → Orgel
1814	Beelitz	St. Marien und St. Nikolai		I/P	12	Built with parts of the previous organ, extended in 1847 by Gottfried Wilhelm Baer to II/P, 18, replaced in 1886 by Eifert.
1815	Berge bei Nauen	Dorfkirche St. Peter und Paul		I/P	?	Newly built around 1815, noted in the chronicle as "mehr schlecht als recht", unplayable in 1914 due to woodworm infestation, the tin pipes were given up in the First World War, replaced by painted pipes on plywood, replaced in 1938 by a new building by Schuke from Potsdam, only the facade has been preserved, but redesigned in 2001.
1817	Hohenbruch near Kremmen	Village church		I/P	10	Commissioned by the Potsdam government; preserved.
1824	Kaltenborn	Village church		I	6	smallest preserved organ, newspaper May 1824 in wind chest, rebuilt several times, 2006 and 2011 restoration by Karl Schuke Berliner Orgelbauwerkstatt, Flöte 4' stop not playable.
1824	Altlüdersdorf Gransee	Village church		I	8	Without pedal, with son Johann Friedrich, according to an inscription in the organ; preserved.
1827	Lichterfelde, Uckermark	Village church		I	4	Purchase of an organ for 429 thalers on 30 August 1827, replaced in 1857 by Ferdinand Dinse.
1828	Nackel	Village church		I/P	12 (9)	Attribution; preserved.
1828	Joachimsthal	Kreuzkirche	I/P	14	Disposition design in 1825, extensive rebuilding/new construction in 1909 in the old casing with some old pipes by Albert Kienscherf.	
1829	Wildberg Prignitz	Village church		I/P	19 (16)	Completed by son Johann Friedrich Turley.
