= Teichgräber =

Teichgräber (lit. 'pond digger') is a German surname. Notable people with the surname include:

- Heinrich Wilhelm Teichgräber (1809–1848), German lithographer and artist
- Niklas Teichgräber (born 1996), German former footballer

== See also ==
- Teichgraeber–Runbeck House, a historic house in Lindsborg, Kansas
- Karl Deichgräber (1903–1984), German classical philologist
