= David Engel =

David Engel may refer to:

- David Engel (actor) (born 1959), Broadway singer, dancer, and actor
- David Engel (historian) (born 1951), American historian
- David Engel (tennis) (born 1967), retired Swedish tennis player
- David Hermann Engel (1816–1877), German organist and composer

See also:

- David Engels (born 1979), Belgian historian
