= Christoph Nichelmann =

German composer and harpsichordist

- Born: 13 August 1717; Treuenbrietzen, Kingdom of Prussia
- Died: 20 July 1762 (aged 44) Berlin, Kingdom of Prussia
- Genre: Classical
- Occupations: Composer, harpsichordist
- Instrument: Harpsichord
- Years active: 1730–1756

Christoph Nichelmann (13 August 1717 – 20 July 1762) was a German composer and harpsichordist. He was second keyboard player in the Royal Ensemble of Frederick the Great.

== Biography ==
Nichelmann was born in Treuenbrietzen. Starting in 1730, he attended the Thomasschule in Leipzig on the advice of a relative, where he was accepted by Johann Sebastian Bach. He may have been the soprano that Bach had in mind when he composed his cantata Jauchzet Gott in allen Landen. He studied composition and was taught to play keyboard instruments by Wilhelm Friedemann Bach. In 1733, because of his interest in opera, he went to Hamburg to explore theatrical music in the French and Italian style. There he was a student of Reinhard Keiser, Georg Philipp Telemann and Johann Mattheson. At times he worked as a private secretary for musicians and noble families.

In 1739 Nichelmann moved to Berlin, where he continued his studies with Johann Joachim Quantz and Carl Heinrich Graun. In 1742, he decided to travel to England and France, returning to Hamburg two years later. An offer from King Frederick the Great of Prussia brought him again to Berlin, where in 1744 he became the second harpsichordist of the royal operatic ensemble, ("zweiter Cembalist der königl. Operncapelle") to accompany the king, who played the flute. He retained this position until 1756. From then on he had to support himself by giving private lessons. Nichelmann's last years were made difficult by the Seven Years' War. He died in Berlin.

== Work ==
Nichelmann's traditional compositions fall within the period of 1737-1759, which was a time of changing musical styles, from Baroque to the early classical period. Best known are his piano concertos in three-movements (fast-slow-fast). He also wrote eighteen concertos, one overture, and three symphonies, as well as choral works and other piano pieces. His twenty-two songs are early examples of the Berliner Liederschule, or Berlin school of songs. His serenata Il sogno di Scipione was known in the 18th century.

Nichelmann's treatise Die Melodie, nach ihrem Wesen sowohl, als nach ihren Eigenschaften (Melody, after its Nature and its Properties) (1755) was acclaimed, although it was criticized by a theorist under the pen name Caspar Dünkelfeind. It is probable that this critic was Carl Philipp Emanuel Bach.

== Bibliography ==
- Douglas A. Lee: "Nichelmann, Christoph", in: The New Grove Dictionary of Music and Musicians, 2nd ed. by Stanley Sadie and John Tyrrell (Oxford University Press, 2001), ISBN 978-0-19-517067-2
- Thomas-M. Langner: "Nichelmann, Christoph", in: Die Musik in Geschichte und Gegenwart, 1st ed. by Friedrich Blume (Kassel: Bärenreiter, 1949–1986)
- Krebs, Michael Harald: Thematisch-Systematisches Verzeichnis der Werke Christoph Nichelmann. Nichelmann-Werke-Verzeichnis (NWV) (PhD thesis, Potsdam, 2002)
