= Eduard Krüger (music historian) =

Eduard Krüger (9 December 1807 – 8 November 1885) was a German musicologist, composer and philologist.

== Life ==
Born in Lüneburg, Krüger received his doctorate from the University of Göttingen in 1830 and then continued his studies in Berlin. In 1832 he obtained a position as assistant teacher at the Gymnasium in Emden, where he soon became headmaster, interrupted by a brief appointment at the Alte Gymnasium in Göttingen.

From 1838 he corresponded with Robert Schumann, who appreciated him as a skilful writer and won him as a collaborator for his Neue Zeitschrift für Musik. The correspondence ended abruptly after Krüger criticised Schumann's opera Genoveva in 1851. In the public dispute between Oswald Lorenz, pseudonym Hans Grobgedakt, on the subject of "organ tone and organ playing" with the main question of "pliability of the organ tone" or of a "need for essential changes in the organ tone"", Krüger took sides with Lorenz, whom he did not know personally but who also wrote articles for the Neue Zeitschrift für Musik.

From 1852 to 1859, Krüger was chief inspector of education for the whole of East Frisia in Aurich.

In 1859, he found employment as an "assistant worker" at the library of the University of Göttingen and eventually received a professorship there in 1862, teaching "Theory and History of Music". His most important student was Hugo Riemann, who received his doctorate from him in 1873. Here he also began in 1876, in collaboration with his colleague Ludwig Schöberlein and the pastor Max Herold, the publication of the journal Siona. Monatschrift für Liturgie und Kirchenmusik.

== Work ==
- De Musicis graecorum organis circa Pindari tempora Florentibus, Diss. phil. Göttingen 1830
- Grundriß der Metrik antiker und moderner Sprachen, Emden 1838
- Beiträge für Leben und Wissenschaft der Tonkunst, Leipzig: Breitkopf & Härtel 1847 (Numerized)
- System der Tonkunst, Leipzig 1866 (Numerized)
- Musikalische Psychologie nach Anleitung von Gervinus’ Buch Handel und Shakespeare, Leipzig: Breitkopf & Härtel 1868
- Musikalische Briefe aus der neuesten Zeit, Münster 1870 (Numerized)
