= Treuenbrietzen massacres =

German and Soviet massacres by the end of World War II

The Treuenbrietzen massacre may refer to two events in Treuenbrietzen, Germany, by the end of World War II on the same day, April 23, 1945.

== Massacre of Italian internees by Wehrmacht ==
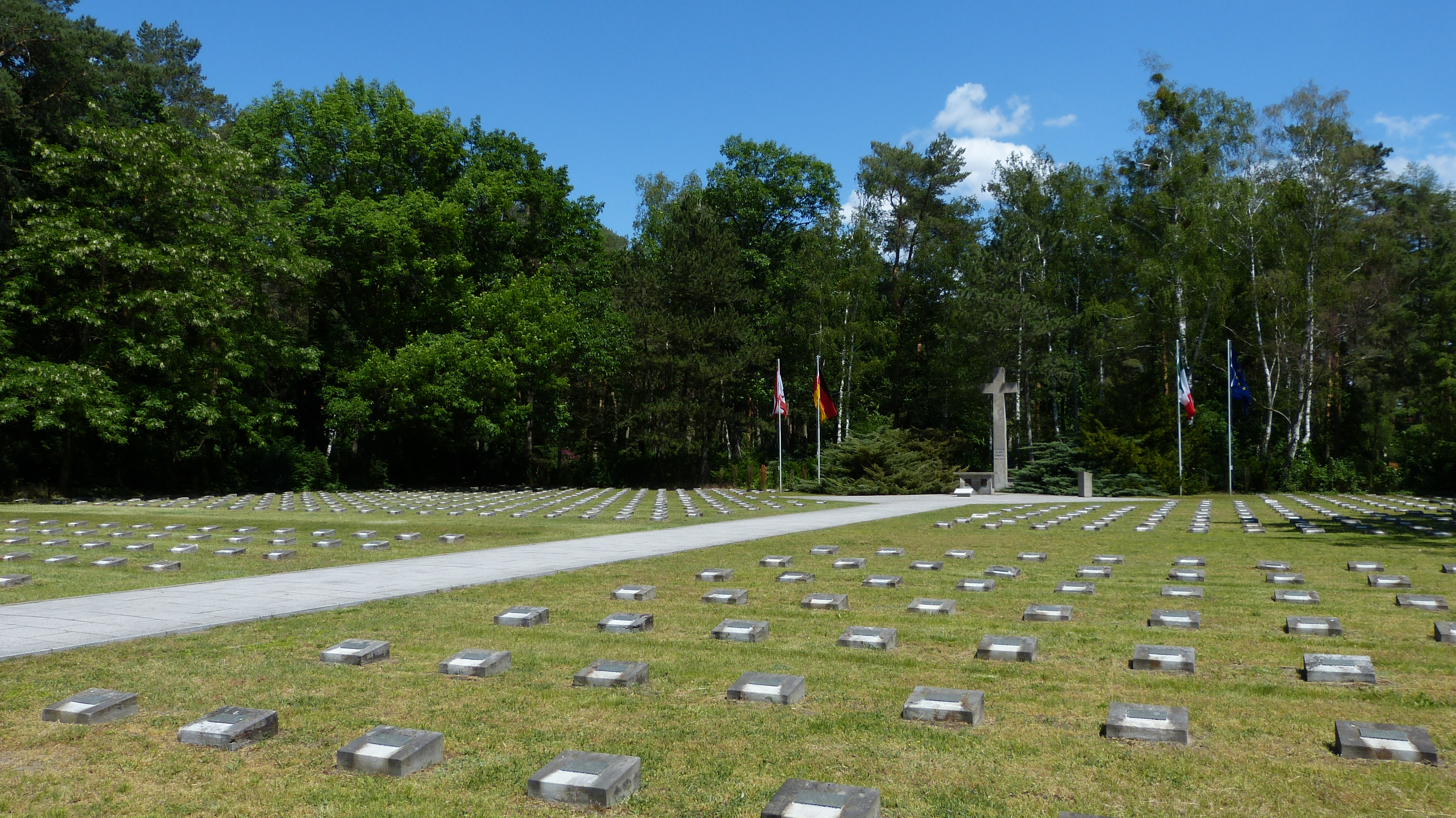
Italian graveyard in Waldfriedhof Zehlendorf cemetery. Berlin

There was the Treuenbritzen subcamp of the Sachsenhausen concentration camp. Among others it held Italian internees, with some of them being Italian soldiers deported to Germany after Italy left the Axis powers in 1943. They worked in a small local ammunition factory. In 1945 the Soviet Army liberated the camp, but two days later on April 23, 1945, the Wehrmacht returned and the Germans executed 127 Italian POWs in the nearby Nichel forest. Several months after the war the massacred were reburied in the forest and later some of them were reburied in Italy and some in the Italian section of Waldfriedhof Zehlendorf, Berlin.

== Massacre of German civilians by Red Army ==
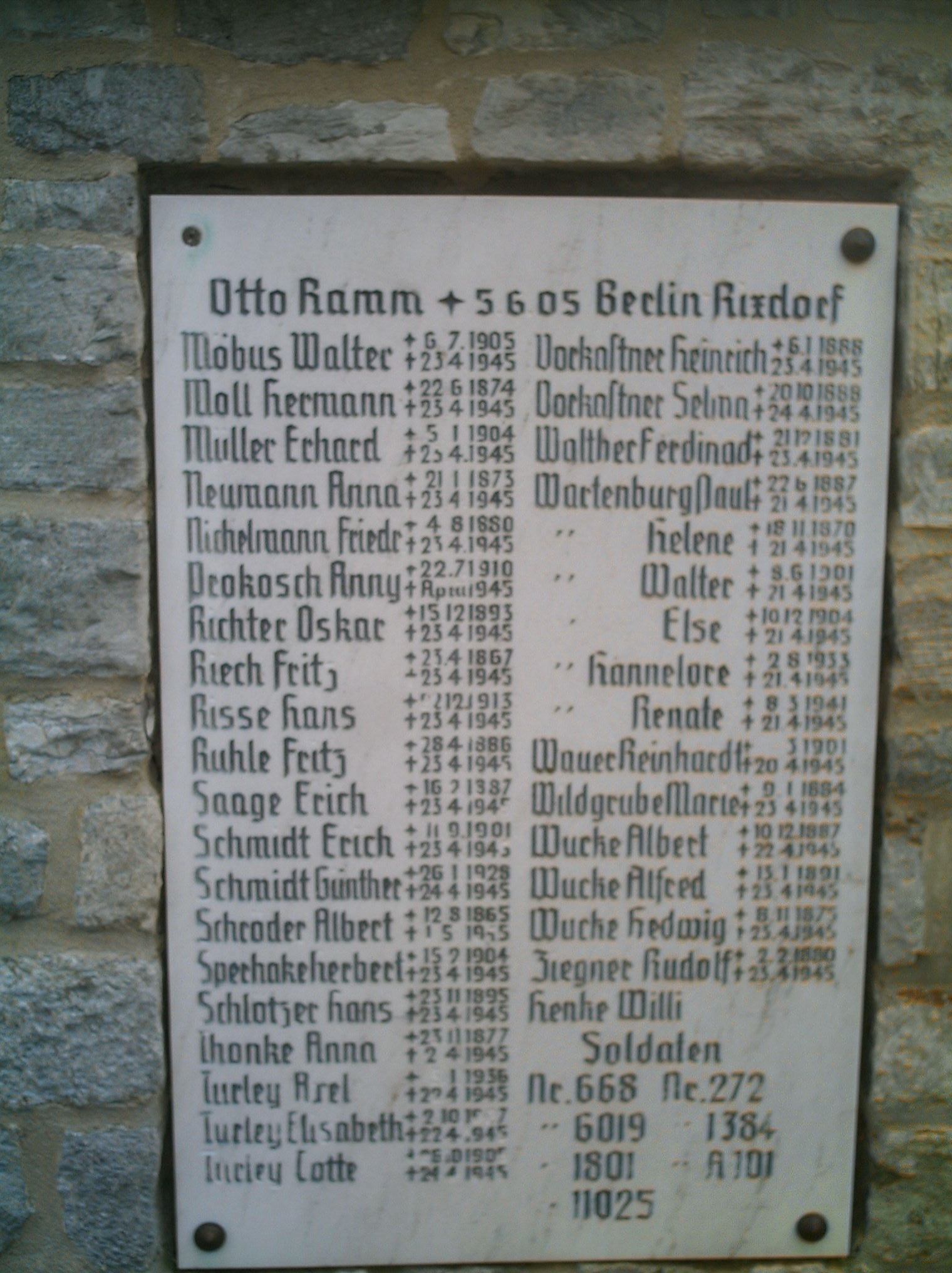
A plaque at the Treuenbrietzen cemetery showing the date 23.4.1945

During the first occupation of Treuenbrietzen by the Red Army, on April 21 or 22 a higher Soviet officer was shot. During the second occupation of the town, Red Army soldiers rounded up the civilians and shot the adult men in a nearby forest. The official estimate is between 30 and 166 civilian victims. Some German sources claimed about 1,000 victims, but this must be rejected on the basis of the actual number of town residents.
