= Wittbrietzen =

Village in Brandenburg, Germany

- Village
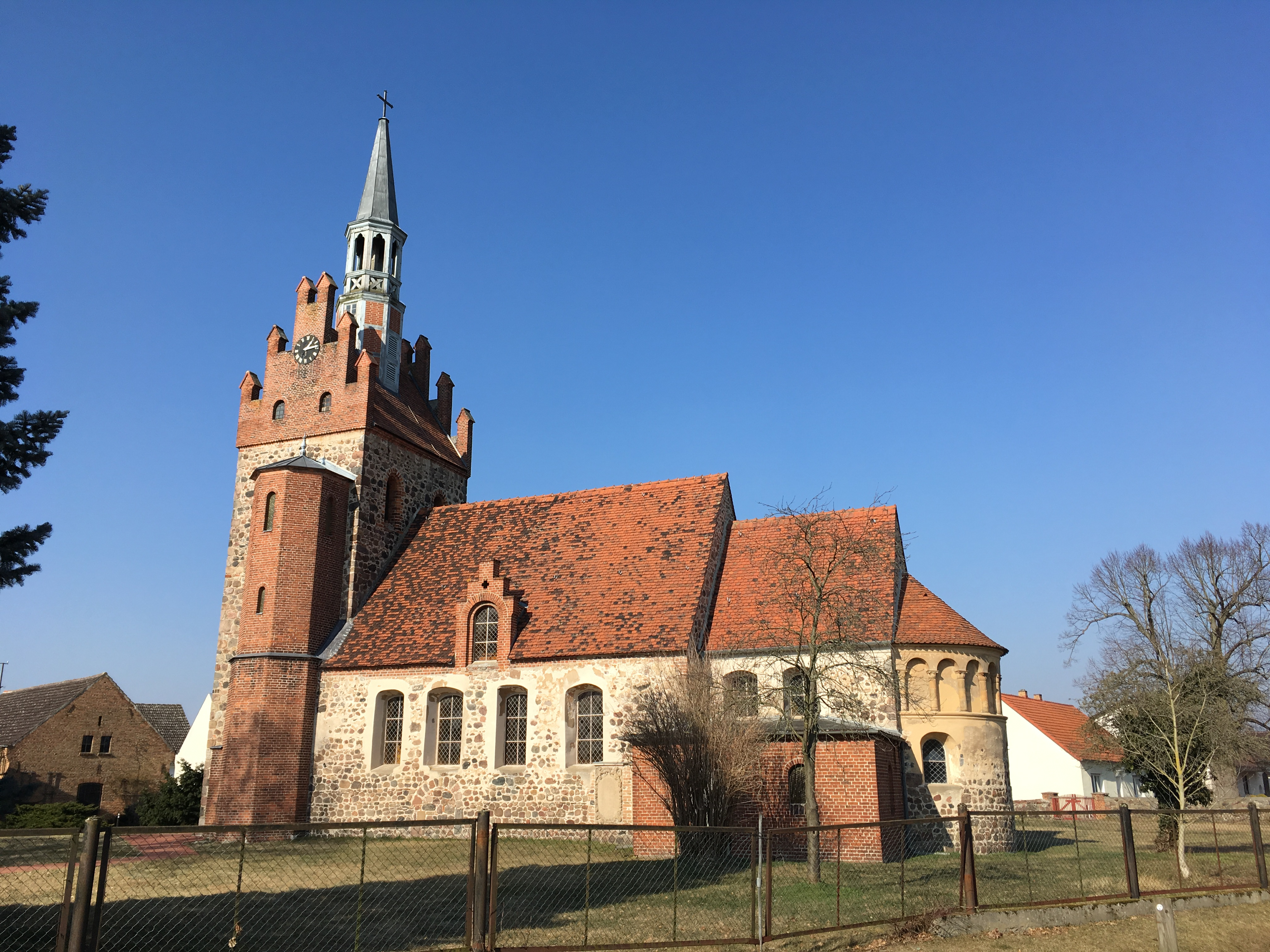
- Village church in Wittbrietzen

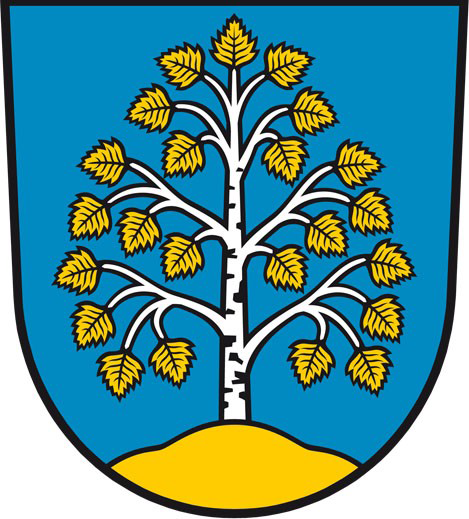
- Coat of arms

- Location in Brandenburg
- Coordinates: 52°10′51″N 12°58′31″E
- Country: Germany
- State: Brandenburg
- District: Potsdam-Mittelmark
- Town: Treuenbrietzen
- Incorporated: 31 December 2001

Area
  - Total: 15.8 km^{2} (6.1 sq mi)
- Elevation: 47 m (154 ft)

Population (6 November 2024)
  - Total: 499
  - Density: 31.6/km^{2} (81.8/sq mi)
- Postal code: 14547
- Area code: 033204

Wittbrietzen is a village (Ortsteil) of the town of Treuenbrietzen in the district of Potsdam-Mittelmark, in the state of Brandenburg, Germany.

== Demographics ==
As of 2024, Wittbrietzen had a population of about 499 residents.
