= Emil Robert Höpner =

19th-century German organist

Emil Robert Höpner (4 July 1846 – 20 December 1903) was a German organist and music educator.

== Life and career ==
Born in Dresden, Höpner was Royal Saxon Music Director and organist at the Dresden Frauenkirche from 1872 to 1885. He was unanimously elected to this position at the Kreuzkirche to succeed the late organist Christian Robert Pfretzschner (1821–1885). He worked there from 1885 to 1902, as well as teaching at the Conservatory of Music in his native Dresden. His father, Christian Gottlob Höpner (1799–1859), was also Kreuzorganist from 1837 to 1859. Höpner had his first organist position at the Reformed Church in Dresden in the late 1860s and he worked as a music teacher at the same time. As a full member of the Ton-Künstler-Verein zu Dresden, Höpner participated on 9 March 1885, together with the teacher of the Dresden Conservatory Eugen Krantz (1844–1898) at a practice evening of this society by playing the Bach Concerto for Two Pianos in C Major accompanied by string instruments. Also on 7 April 1893, Höpner took part in a performance evening of the Tonkünstler-Verein zu Dresden and together with his colleague from the conservatory and organist of the Frauenkirche Paul Janssen played Mozart's "Sonata in E-flat Major Quartet for Two Pianos".

Höpner was one of the Dresden organists who presented the new Jehmlich organ in its tonal possibilities on 12 March 1899 in Loschwitz. Together with the organist and cantor of the Johanniskirche, Hans Fährmann (1860–1940), and the church musician at St. Peter's Church, Friedrich Wilhelm Borrmann, as well as the local church school teacher, Friedrich Kettner, the Kreuzorganist arranged a festive concert in the rebuilt Loschwitz church.

In addition to his work as an organist, Höpner gave piano and organ lessons. In the school year 1884/85, eight pupils attended his lessons in the special subject of music at the Hochschule für Musik Carl Maria von Weber. Since 1 December 1885, he also gave organ lessons there. Among his pupils was the later Kapellmeister and composer Georg Pittrich.

Together with Paul Janssen, the Royal Director of Music, Höpner played the Festive Prelude for organ four hands and double pedal on the occasion of the 40th anniversary of the assumption of patronage of the Dresden Conservatory by the Crown Prince of Saxony and later King Albert of Saxony.

Höpner was last mentioned as a teacher at the Dresden Conservatory in the Dresden address book of 1901, when he lived in Grunaer Straße. He supported the library of the music conservatory with valuable gifts. He retired as organist at the Kreuzkirche in 1902.

== Honours ==
The violoncellist of the Sächsische Staatskapelle Dresden from 1870 to 1908 and composer Carl Hüllweck (1852–1910) assigned an arioso for violoncello and organ, also for "pianoforte"/piano, to his "dear friend Emil Höpner organist at the Frauenkirche in Dresden." Gustav Flügel (1812–1900) dedicated his work Op. 99 III Fugues for organ to the Kreuzorganist Emil Höpner, also during his lifetime.

The Kreuzorganist was appointed music director in 1891.

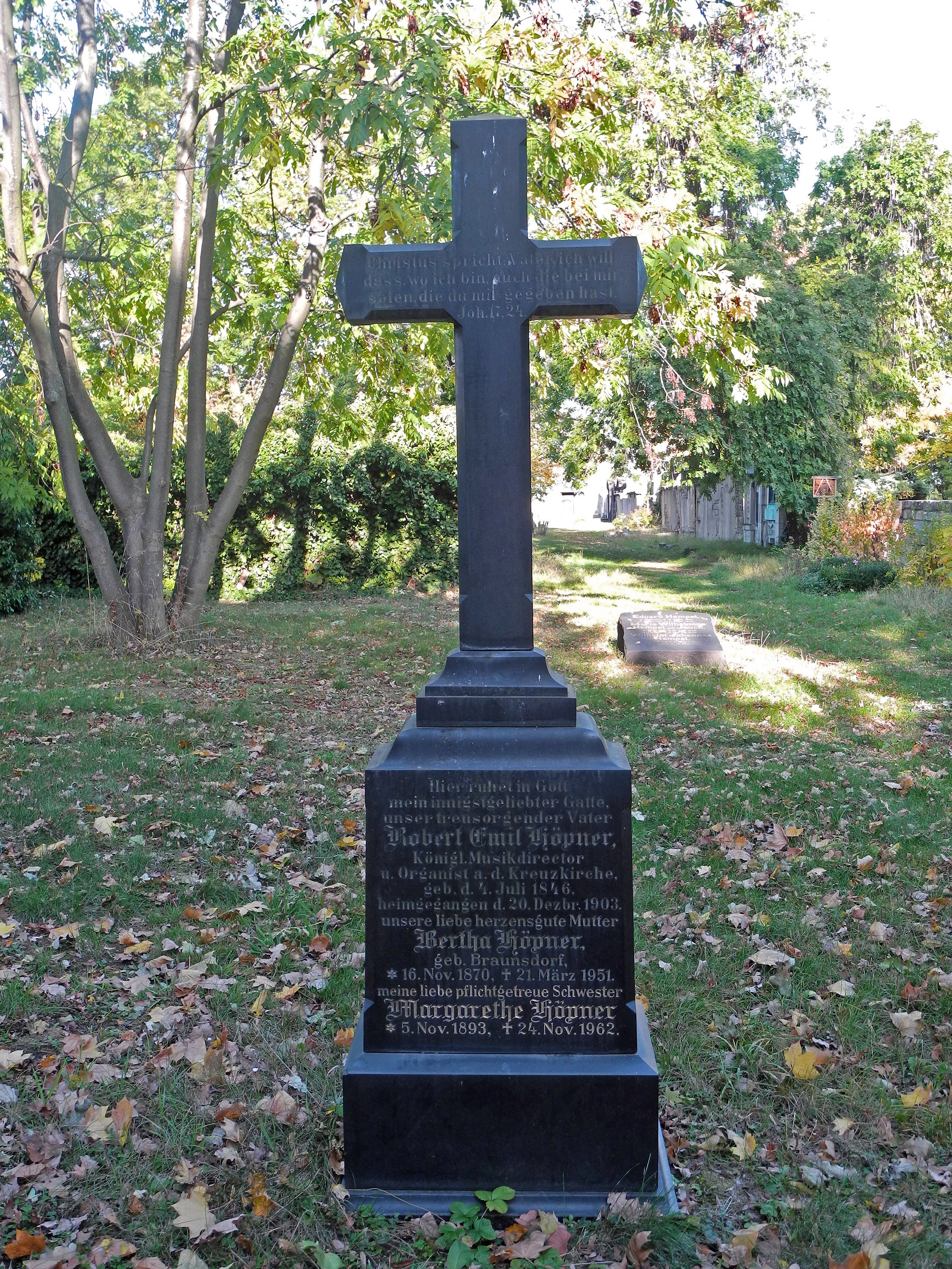
Gravesite of the organist Robert Emil Höpner at the Alten Annenfriedhof

== Last resting place ==
At the beginning of 1904, the German-language American newspaper Indiana Tribüne reported from the villa district of Dresden Oberloschwitz that "after a long suffering, Robert Emil Höpner, music director and organist (ret.) had died". The newspaper Dresdner Neueste Nachrichten had already informed on 23 December 1903 that the royal music director, organist Höpner in Loschwitz died, highlighting his longstanding ties with the Dresden Conservatory as well as the Kreuzkirche.

Höpner's final resting place is at the Alter Annenfriedhof in Dresden. His wife Bertha Höpner, née Braunsdorf, born on 16 November 1870, died on 21 March 1951, is also buried there. The son Robert Paul Höpner born in 1892 and for decades (since 1914) organist as well as cantor at the Lukaskirche, arranged for his sister Margarethe (1893–1962) to be commemorated on their parents' gravestone, especially because of her devotion to duty.
