= Friedrich Heinrich Himmel =

German composer (1765–1814)

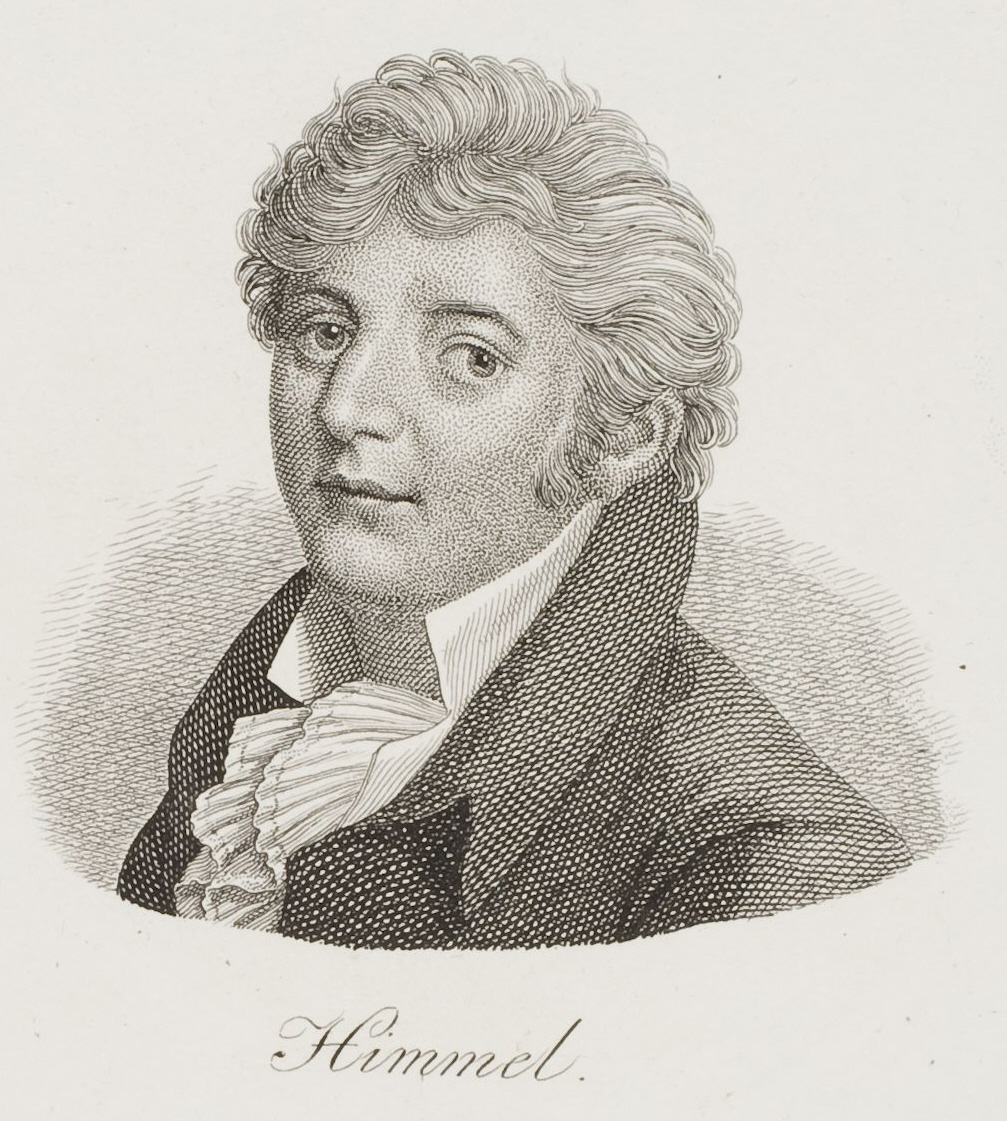
Friedrich Heinrich Himmel

Friedrich Heinrich Himmel (November 20, 1765 – June 8, 1814) was a German composer.

== Biography ==
Himmel was born at Treuenbrietzen in Brandenburg, Prussia, and originally studied theology at Halle before turning to music.

During a temporary stay at Potsdam he had an opportunity of showing his self-acquired skill as a pianist before King Frederick William II, who thereupon provided him with a yearly allowance to enable him to complete his musical studies. This he did under Johann Gottlieb Naumann, a German composer of the Italian school, and the style of that school Himmel himself adopted in his operas.

The first of these, a pastoral opera, Il primo navigatore, was produced at Venice in 1794 with great success. In 1792, he went to Berlin, where his oratorio Isaaco was produced, in consequence of which he was made court Kapellmeister to the king of Prussia. In that capacity he wrote a great deal of official music, including cantatas and a coronation Te Deum.

His Italian operas, successively composed for Stockholm, St Petersburg and Berlin, were all received with great favour in their day. Of greater importance than these is a Singspiel to words by Kotzebue, called Fanchon. Himmel's gift of writing genuine simple melodies is also observable in his Lieder, including An Alexis send ich dich (To Alexis). He died in Berlin.

== Works ==
=== Operas ===
- Il primo navigatore, pastorale Venice (1794)
- La morte di Semiramide, opera seria Naples (1795)
- Fanchon oder das Leyermädel, Singspiel Berlin (1804)
- Die Sylphen Zauberoper, Berlin (1806)
- Der Kobold, komische Oper, Vienna (1813)
- Alessandro (1799)
- Vasco di Gama (1801)
- Frohsinn und Schwarmerei (1801)

=== Lieder ===
- An Alexis send ich dich
- Vater unser
- Gebet während der Schlacht: "Vater ich rufe dich!"
- Die Blumen und der Schmetterling, Lieder cycle

=== Church music and cantatas ===
- Two masses
- Te Deum, for four voices and orchestra
- Salve Regina, for four voices and instruments
- Beatus vir, for four voices and instruments
- In exitu Israel
- Dixit Dominus
- Das Vertrauen auf Gott, cantata
- Das Lob Gottes ("Singet dem Herrn")
- Lobe den Herren, for choir and orchestra
- Psalmen Davids, for two voices and orchestra
- Three cantatas for choir and orchestra:
  - Was betrubst du dich
  - Heilig ist mein Beherrscher
  - Wann Gott auch aufs Tiefste
- Trauer-Cantate zur Begräbnissfeyer Friedrich Wilhelm II von Preussen, for four voices and orchestra
- The 146th Psalm
- Vater unser, von Mahlmann
- other pieces of church music in manuscript

== Bibliography ==
- Gerhard Allrogen: "Himmel, Friedrich Heinrich", in The New Grove Dictionary of Opera, ed. Stanley Sadie (London, 1992), ISBN 0-333-73432-7
