= David Hermann Engel =

German organist and composer

David Hermann Engel (22 January 1816 – 3 May 1877) was a German organist and composer.

== Life ==
Born in Neuruppin, after his first organ lessons with Friedrich Wilke in Neu-Ruppin, Engel studied with Friedrich Schneider in Dessau and Adolf Friedrich Hesse in Breslau. In 1841, he went to Berlin, where he worked as a music and singing teacher. Some of his works appeared in print here. His acquaintance with Gustav Wilhelm Teschner led him to study older Italian church music. His chorale book, published in 1844, earned him high recognition and as a result he received repeated commissions to compose for the Staats- und Domchor Berlin. In 1848, Engel was elected organist at the Merseburg Cathedral.

Engel is considered the "discoverer" and patron of the organ builder Friedrich Ladegast.

Engel died in Merseburg at the age of 61.

== Awards ==
- Engel received the goldene Medaille für Kunst und Wissenschaft from the Prussian King for the publication of the Choralbuch zur gottesdienstlichen Feier für Kirche und Haus.

== Work ==
- Choralbuch (with interludes) zur gottesdienstlichen Feier für Kirche und Haus Op. 10, Berlin 1844 OCLC 17710483
- Der 81. Psalm Op. 11, Berlin 1847 OCLC 1073230132
- Der 61. Psalm Op. 12, Eisleben 1852
- Zehn Orgelstücke Op. 15, Erfurt 1855 OCLC 864465069
- Winfried und die heilige Eiche bei Geismar Op. 20
- Geistliche Melodien aus dem 17. Jahrhundert Op. 24, Leipzig 1857
- Zionsharfe Op. 26, Leipzig 1860
- Weihnachts-Hymne Op. 37, Leipzig 1872
