= Oswald Lorenz =

German musicologist and composer

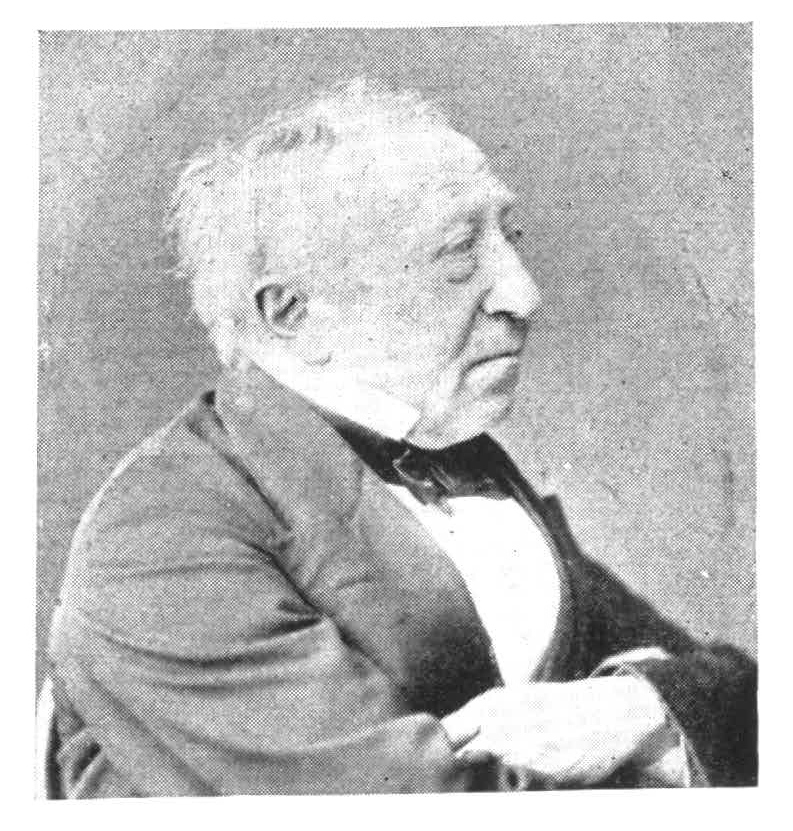
Portrait

Oswald Lorenz (30 September 1806 – 22 April 1889) was a German musicologist and composer.

== Life ==
Born in Johanngeorgenstadt, Lorenz was the son of the schoolmaster Christian Gottlob Lorenz and came from the Erzgebirge region of Saxony. As a music teacher and writer, he became a friend of Robert Schumann, whose music journal he edited from 1 July to 31 December 1844. He wrote numerous articles for the Neue Zeitschrift für Musik which had been published since 1834. In this journal, under the pseudonym "Hans Grobgedakt", he published in 1843 his review of Zehn Adagio in freiern Styl für die Orgel – Op. 11 of the organist Christian Gottlob Höpner at the Dresden Frauenkirche. At the end of 1844, Lorenz moved to Winterthur, where he worked as a singing teacher and organist from 1845 to 1872 and where he died at the age of 82 in 1889.

Schumann dedicated the song cycle Frauen-Liebe und Leben to Lorenz - probably also in allusion to the fact that Oswald remained unmarried his entire life.

In 1838, Lorenz set Mignons Lied to music. In 1849, he published the Schulgesangbuch für die Stadtschulen von Winterthur.
