= Johann Friedrich Turley =

German organ builder (1804–1855)

Johann Friedrich Turley (23 June 1804 – 1855 "not far from Köthen") was a German organ builder, who worked in Brandenburg in the first half of the 19th century.

== Life ==
Born in Treuenbrietzen, Turley learned organ building from his father Johann Tobias Turley and was his collaborator in the last years of his life. Several new organs were built by the two of them together. After his father's death, he took over the workshop and moved with the company to Brandenburg, where he worked together with his half-brother Albert Turley after 1844. He bore the title "Königlich-Preußischer Orgelbaumeister". On 28 December 1827, he married Theresia Meyer from Wendhausen, from whom he divorced before 1844.

== Work (selection) ==
Several new organs by Johann Friedrich Turley are known - most of them in the western Mark Brandenburg. Characteristic since the 1830s are the "coreless lingual pipes" with deeply seated cores and the ivory mouthpieces on tongue pipes. Some instruments have survived. Instruments that are no longer extant are set in italics.

New organ buildings

| Year | Location | Building | Picture | Manual | Stops | Notes |
|---|---|---|---|---|---|---|
| 1824 | Altlüdersdorf near Gransee | Village church | | I | 8 | With the father Johann Tobias Turley, according to the inscription in the organ, no pedal; preserved |
| 1824 | Frankenfelde near Luckenwalde | Village church | | I/P | 15 | First own organ, stop trombone 16′; 2019 extensive reconstruction of the original disposition by Alexander Schuke Potsdam Orgelbau |
| 1826 | Wölmsdorf | Village church | | | | Built alone; since the mid-1970s in the old chapel of the Evangelisches Krankenhaus Königin Elisabeth Herzberge in Berlin-Lichtenberg, restored in 2015. |
| ca. 1827 | Blankenburg (Uckermark) | Village church | | I/P | 15 (11) | With his father (?). |
| 1829 | Wildberg | Village church | | I/P | 16 (12) | Completion of the father's organ |
| 1829 | Mützlitz (Nennhausen) | Village church | | I/P | 6 | Built as an interim organ (originally only 4 stops) for Perleberg, 1831–1833 in the teachers' seminary there, then installed in Mützlitz; extended and rebuilt several times. |
| 1831 | Perleberg | St. Jakobi | zentriert | II/P | 36 | 1913 New construction by Fa. Faber & Greve, Salzhemmendorf; 1958 New construction by Fa. Gebr. Jehmlich, Dresden. |
| 1834 | Teschendorf | Village church | | II/P | 12 | |
| 1836–1838 | Salzwedel | Katharinenkirche | | | 42 | |
| 1836 | Buko | St. Johannes | | | | |
| 1837 | Berlin-Wannsee (Nikolskoe) | Ss. Peter and Paul, Wannsee | | II/P | 19 | Casing preserved; new movement by the Schuke company in 1937, Potsdam. |

Other works

| Year | Location | Buildings | Pictures | Manual | Stops | Notes |
|---|---|---|---|---|---|---|
| 1833 | Treuenbrietzen | St. Marien | | | | Repair of the Wagner Orgel |
| 1836 | Bochow | Village church | | | | Repair of the Wagner organ |
| 1838 | Treuenbrietzen | St. Nikolai | | | | Repair of the Wagner organ |
| 1844 | Rühstädt | Church | | | | Repair of the Wagner organ. |
| 1849 | Oschersleben | St. Stephan | | | | Arbeiten |

== Pupils ==
Turley passed on his knowledge to his half-brother Albert Turley. From 1830 to 1833, he taught Friedrich Hermann Lütkemüller. Gottfried Wilhelm Baer was also presumably active with him.
