= Treuenbrietzen =

- Town
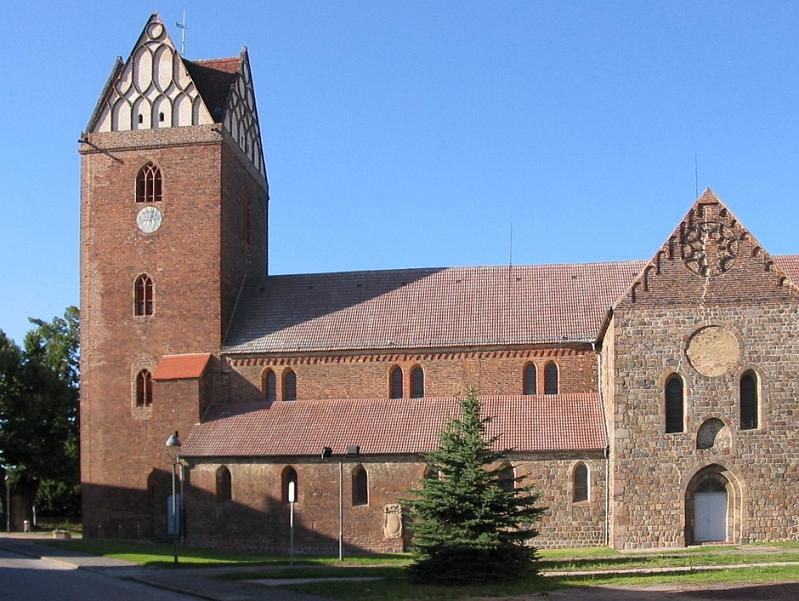
- Saint Mary Church

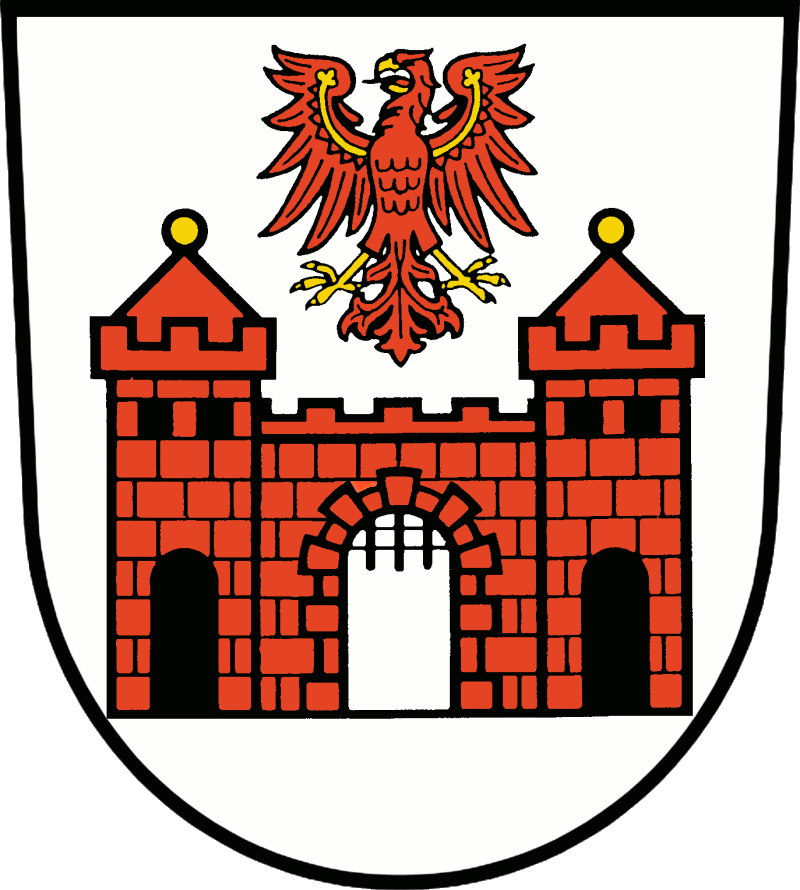
- Coat of arms

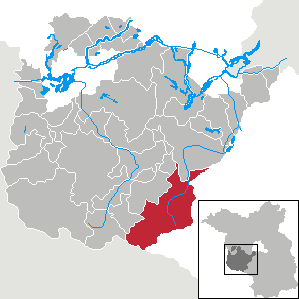
- Location of Treuenbrietzen within Potsdam-Mittelmark district
- Interactive map of Treuenbrietzen
- Location within Germany Location within Brandenburg
- Coordinates: 52°05′50″N 12°52′16″E
- Country: Germany
- State: Brandenburg
- District: Potsdam-Mittelmark
- Subdivisions: 16 Ortsteile

Government
  - Mayor (2017–25): Michael Knape

Area
  - Total: 212.43 km^{2} (82.02 sq mi)
- Elevation: 59 m (194 ft)

Population (2025-12-31)
  - Total: 7,490
  - Density: 35.3/km^{2} (91.3/sq mi)
- Time zone: UTC+01:00 (CET)
  - Summer (DST): UTC+02:00 (CEST)
- Postal codes: 14929
- Dialling codes: 033748
- Vehicle registration: PM
- Website: Treuenbrietzen

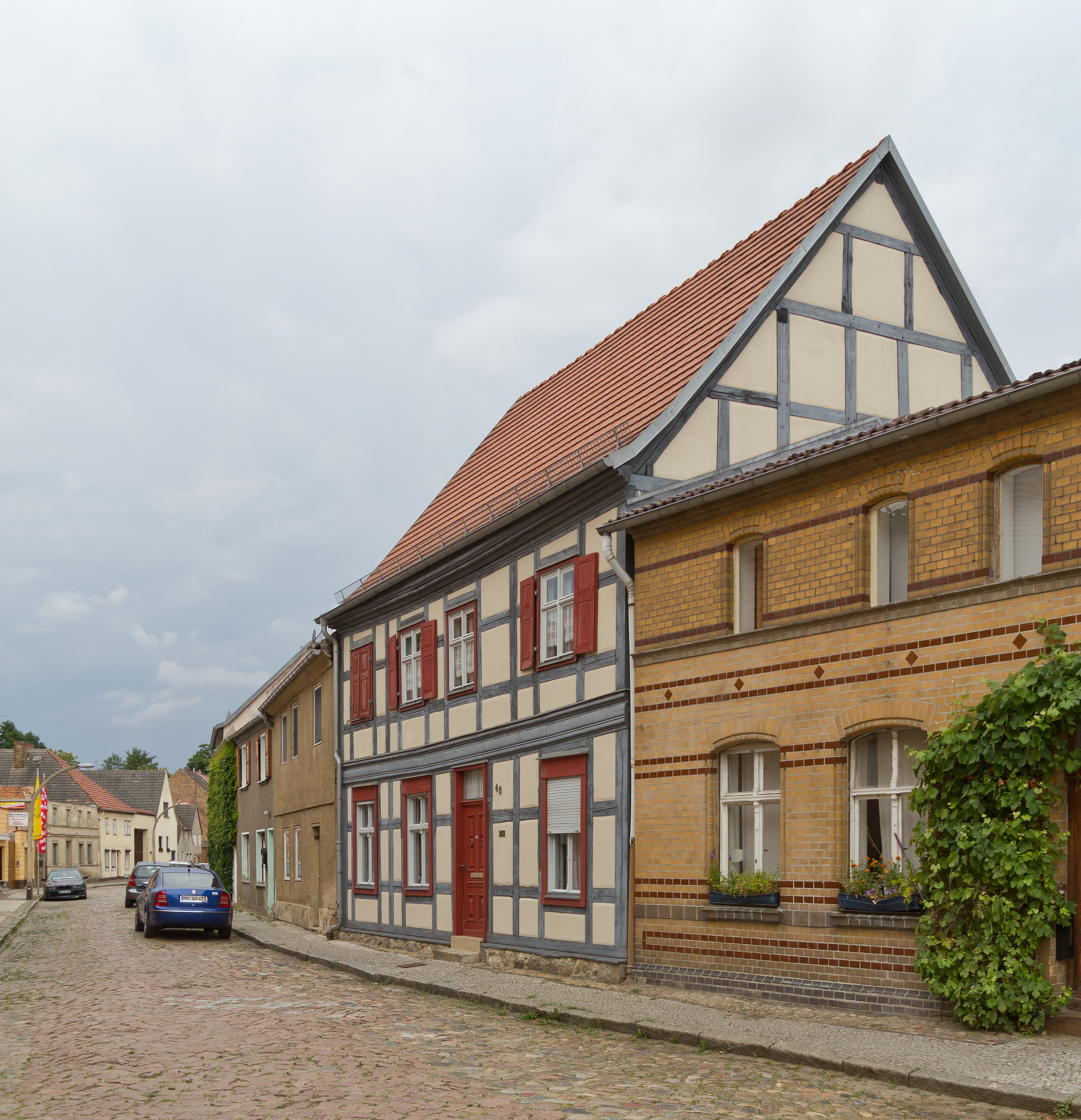
Timber framed houses

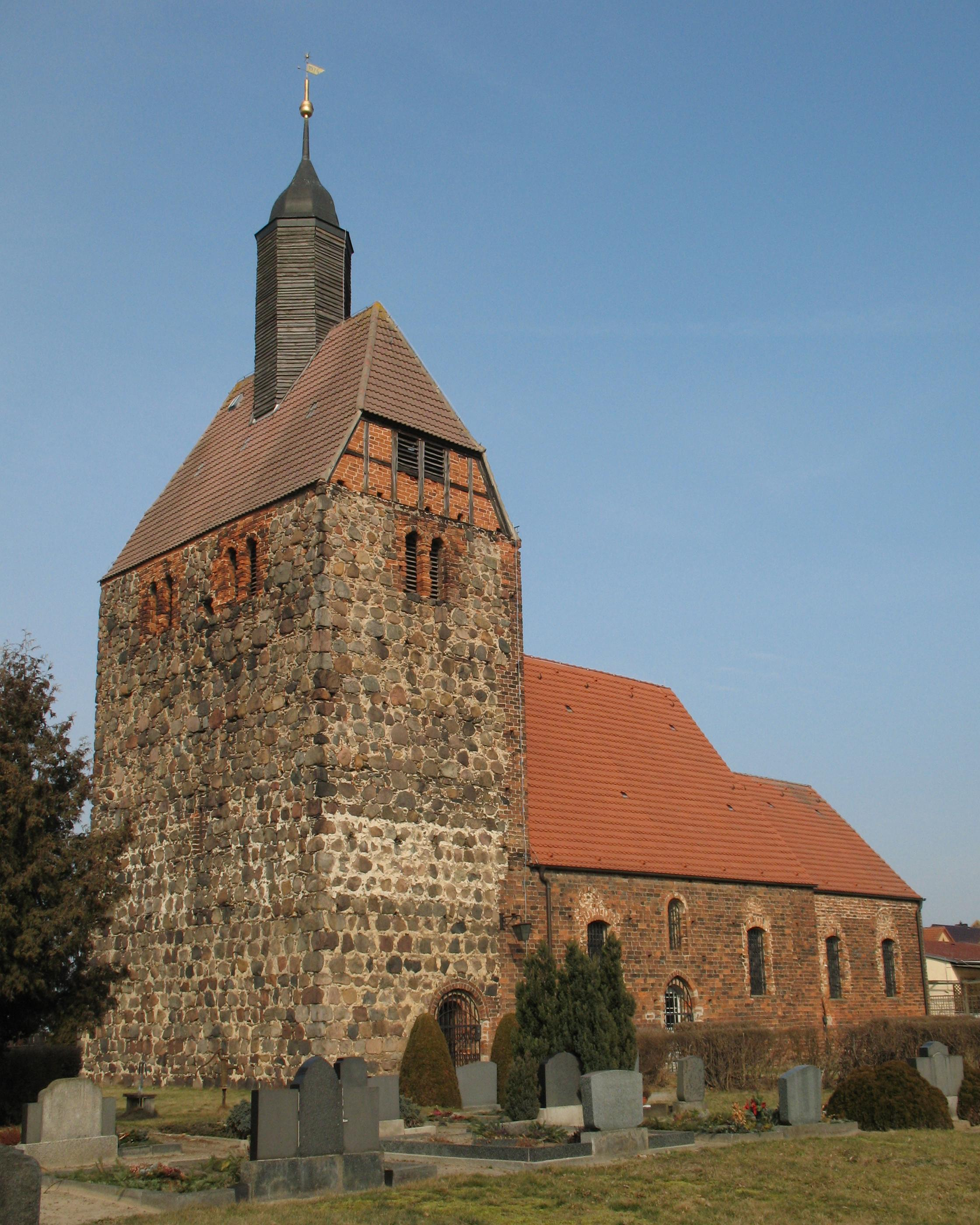
Church in Pechüle

Treuenbrietzen (German pronunciation: [ˈtʁɔʏənˌbʁiːtsn̩]) is a town in the Potsdam-Mittelmark district of Brandenburg, Germany.

== Geography ==
The municipality Treuenbrietzen is situated 32 km northeast of Wittenberg and includes the localities

- city of Treuenbrietzen with its agglomerated suburbs Lüdendorf and Tiefenbrunnen
- Bardenitz with Klausdorf and Pechüle
- Brachwitz
- Dietersdorf
- Feldheim with Schwabeck
- Frohnsdorf
- Lobbese with Pflügkuff and Zeuden
- Lühsdorf
- Marzahna with Schmögelsdorf
- Niebel
- Niebelhorst
- Rietz with Neu-Rietz, Rietz-Ausbau and Rietz-Bucht

== History ==
The town has existed since the Middle Ages and the first written evidence about it is from 1217. From 1348 to 1350 the town remained loyal to the Wittelsbach Louis V, the legitimate Margrave of Brandenburg since 1323, against the revolt of the False Waldemar. This event was the origin of the town's name, "true" or "faithful" Brietzen. During the Reformation, Martin Luther came in 1537 to preach in the town, but his way to the church was blocked. He preached instead under a basswood, or lime tree, which is called to this day the Lutherlinde.

During the Industrial Revolution, several textile factories were founded in the town.

After the opening of the Sachsenhausen concentration camp in 1936, a sub-camp was opened in the town, where slave labourers were forced to work in the local weapons plants. Dr. Kroeber & Sohn GmbH (formerly Gehre Dampfmesser GmbH) was a local firm that made steam, gas and fluid gauges, small internal combustion engines, and the Kroeber M4 light aircraft engine. They made BRAMO/BMW Flugwerk aircraft engine parts for the Luftwaffe. Treuenbrietzener Metallwarenfabrik GmbH had two factories that produced cartridges: Werk Sebaldushof ("Werk A") north of the town, and Werk Selterhof ("Werk S") south of the town. It had three more plants in the towns of Roederhof (a hamlet of Belzig), Metgethen, and Salzwedel.

With the approach of the Red Army, on April 23, 1945, the Wehrmacht executed 127 Italian POWs who were interned in the camp. Between April 24 and May 1, 1945, the region was the scene of the Battleof Halbe between the Wehrmacht and the Red Army.

The town was first occupied by the 5th Guards Mechanised Corps on April 21, 1945, but German Wehrmacht and Waffen SS troops managed to return for a short time, finally retreating on April 23. Subsequently, Red Army soldiers rounded up between 30 and 166 civilians and murdered them in a nearby forest. See "Treuenbrietzen massacres" for more details.

The town suffered considerable damage during the war, although the historic town centre remained intact. Since 1945, the town's economy has been concentrated on cattle farming. In 2005, it had 8,548 residents. The mayor of Treuenbrietzen is Michael Knape, of the Treuenbrietzener Bürgerverein (Treuenbrietzen Civic Association).

== Demography ==
Development of population since 1875 within the current Boundaries (Blue Line: Population; Dotted Line: Comparison to Population development in Brandenburg state; Grey Background: Time of Nazi Germany; Red Background: Time of communist East Germany)

Recent Population Development and Projections (Population Development before Census 2011 (blue line); Recent Population Development according to the Census in Germany in 2011 (blue bordered line); Official projections for 2005-2030 (yellow line); for 2017-2030 (scarlet line); for 2020-2030 (green line)

Treuenbrietzen: Population development
within the current boundaries (2020)

Year	Pop.	±% p.a.
1875	9,422	—
1890	8,939	−0.35%
1910	9,226	+0.16%
1925	9,815	+0.41%
1939	12,239	+1.59%
1950	13,554	+0.93%
1964	11,114	−1.41%

Year	Pop.	±% p.a.
1971	10,961	−0.20%
1981	9,749	−1.16%
1985	9,626	−0.32%
1990	9,251	−0.79%
1995	9,240	−0.02%
2000	8,908	−0.73%
2005	8,475	−0.99%

Year	Pop.	±% p.a.
2010	7,776	−1.71%
2015	7,379	−1.04%
2016	7,460	+1.10%
2017	7,475	+0.20%
2018	7,405	−0.94%
2019	7,459	+0.73%
2020	7,423	−0.48%

== Famous residents ==
- Martin Chemnitz (1522–1586), theologian
- Christoph Nichelmann (1717–1762), composer and harpsichordist
- Friedrich Heinrich Himmel (1765–1814), composer
- Johann Tobias Turley (1773–1829), pipe organ builder
- Johann Friedrich Turley (1804–1855), pipe organ builder
- Gottlob Ludwig Rabenhorst (1806–1881), botanist and mycologist
- Hanns Heise (1913–1992), military officer
- Henry Maske (born 1964), boxer
- Eric Fish (born 1969), rock singer

== See also ==
- Red Army atrocities
