= Heinrich Wilhelm Teichgräber =

German lithographer

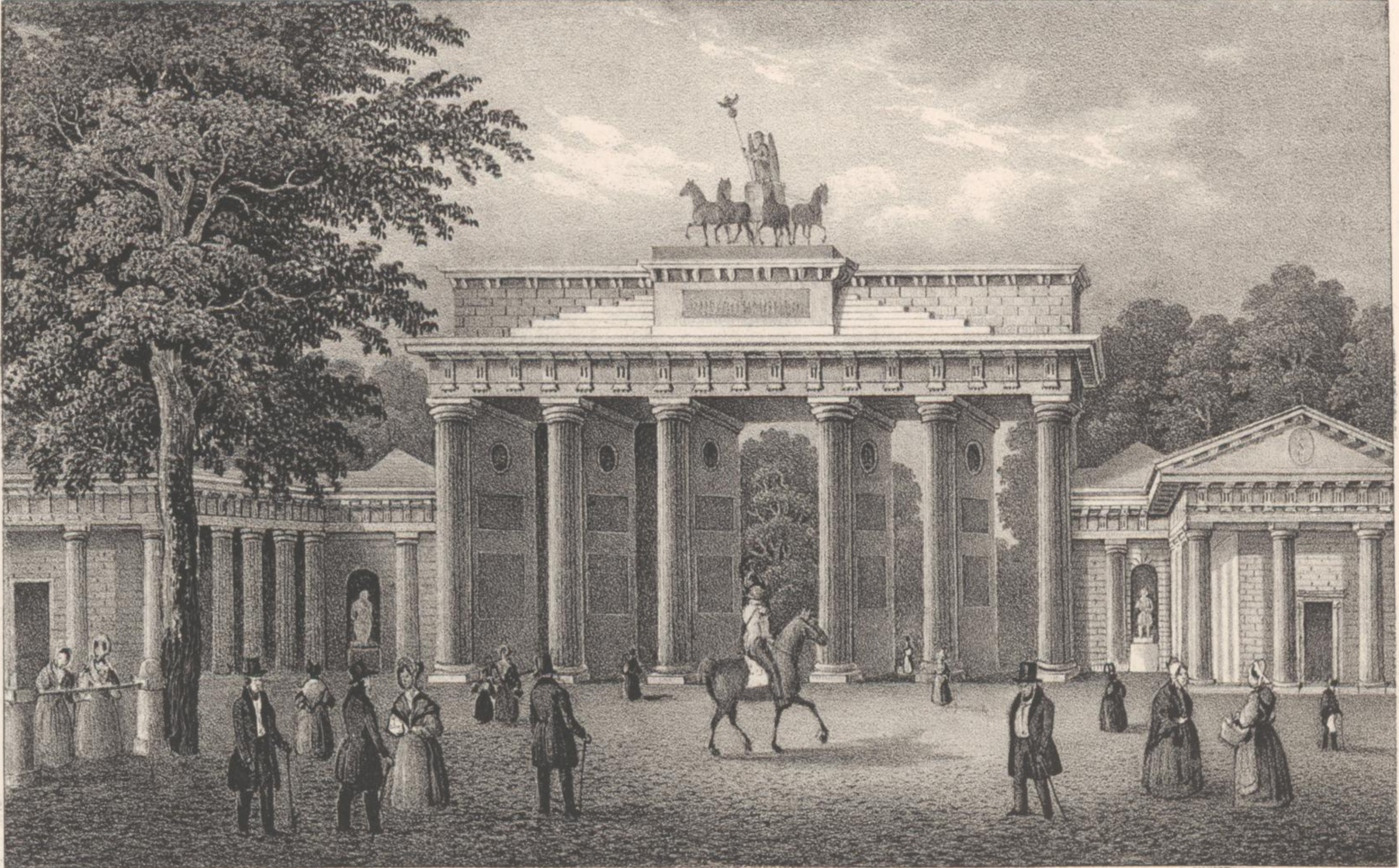
The Brandenburg Gate 1842

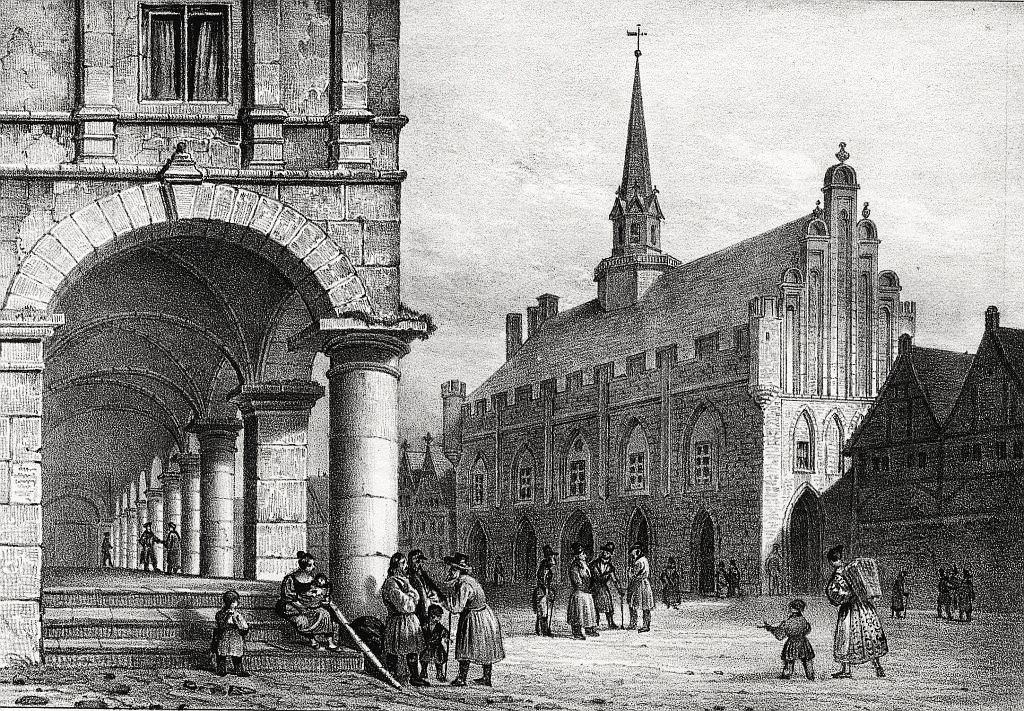
Das Rathaus zu Marienburg 1839

Heinrich Wilhelm Teichgräber (3 April 1809 – 2 April 1848) was a German lithographer and artist.

== Life ==
Born in Oschatz, from 1824 to 1828, Teichgräber was a student at the Dresden Academy. From about 1831 until his death aged 38, he worked as a drawing teacher and stone draughtsman in Dresden.
