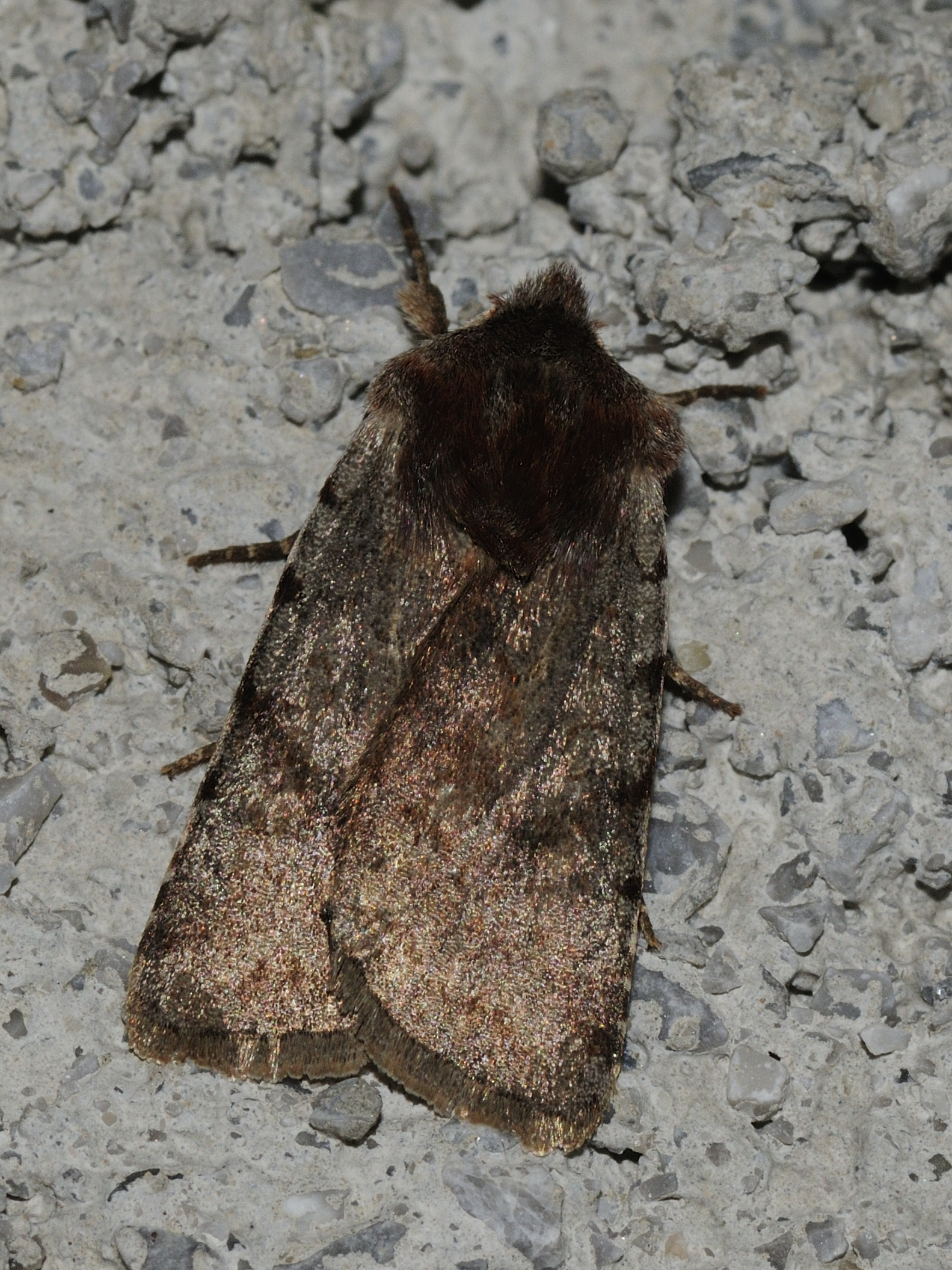

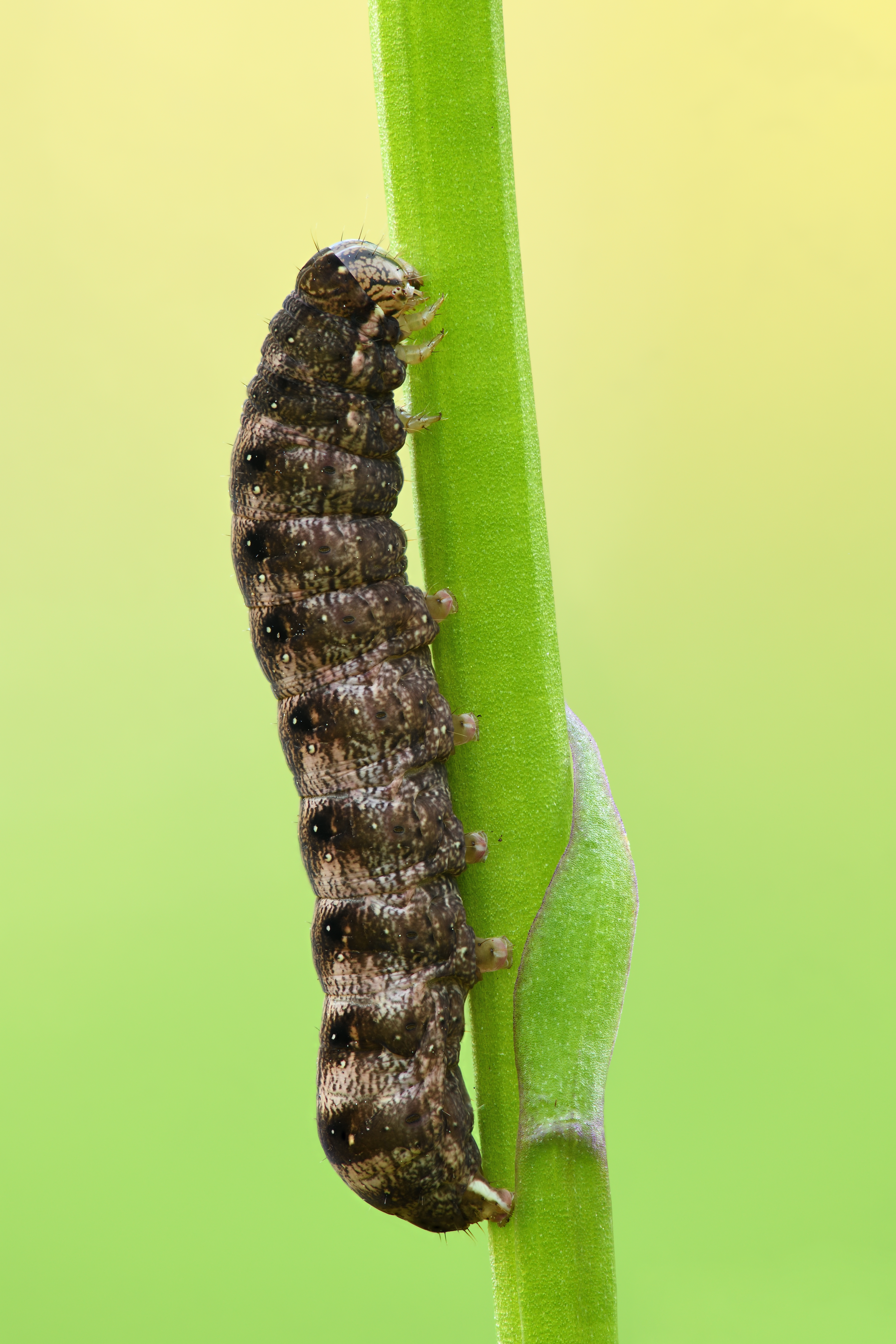
- Caterpillar

Scientific classification
- Domain: Eukaryota
- Kingdom: Animalia
- Phylum: Arthropoda
- Class: Insecta
- Order: Lepidoptera
- Superfamily: Noctuoidea
- Family: Noctuidae
- Genus: Cerastis
- Species: C. rubricosa

Binomial name
- Cerastis rubricosa (Denis & Schiffermüller, 1775)

Synonyms
- Noctua rubricosa [Schiffermüller], 1775; Phalaena (Noctua) mucida Esper, 1790; Phalaena Noctua pilicornis Brahm, 1791; Noctua rufa Haworth, 1809; Noctua mista Hübner, [1813]

= Cerastis rubricosa =

Red chestnut

Species of moth

Cerastis rubricosa, the red chestnut, is a moth of the family Noctuidae. The species was first described by Michael Denis and Ignaz Schiffermüller in 1775. It is found in most of Europe, east through the temperate regions of the Palearctic east to Japan. In the north it is found just north of the Arctic Circle. Southward it is found up to the Mediterranean Basin and Turkey.

== Description ==
The wingspan is 32–38 millimetres (1.3–1.5 in), the forewings are red brown, varied with grey, sometimes with a purplish-brown tinge; stigmata grey with fine dark outlines; a broad angled median shade; lines all starting from black costal spots; hindwing fuscous grey; fringe grey. Generally distributed in Europe, except Spain, and found in western Siberia and western Turkestan. The form rufa Haw., the usual British form, is almost wholly rufous, and the fringe pink. - mucida Esp. is dark purplish red with the costa and subterminal shade slaty grey; - pilicornis Brahm has the red ground almost obliterated by grey suffusion, the crosslines brownish; of this pallida Tutt is merely an extreme pale form; finally, mista Hbn. is brick red with costa, crosslines, and outer margin grey.

== Biology ==
Adults are on wing from March to May depending on the location.

Larva reddish brown, with dark bands on dorsal segments; dorsal line slightly paler: subdorsal pale yellow, narrow; spiracular line brownish, yellow in front. The larvae feed on the leaves of various plants, including Luzula, Gymnadenia conopsea, Lotus corniculatus, Veronica chamaedrys, Rhinanthus alectorolophus and Orchidaceae species.

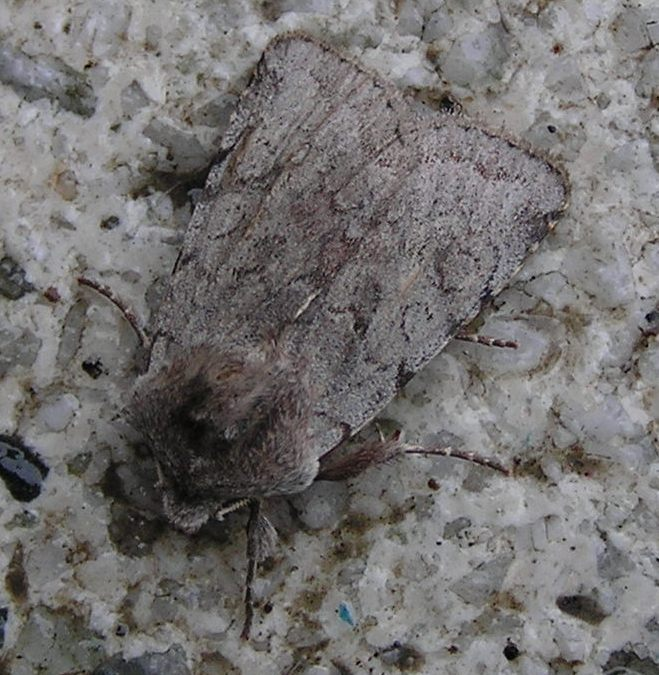

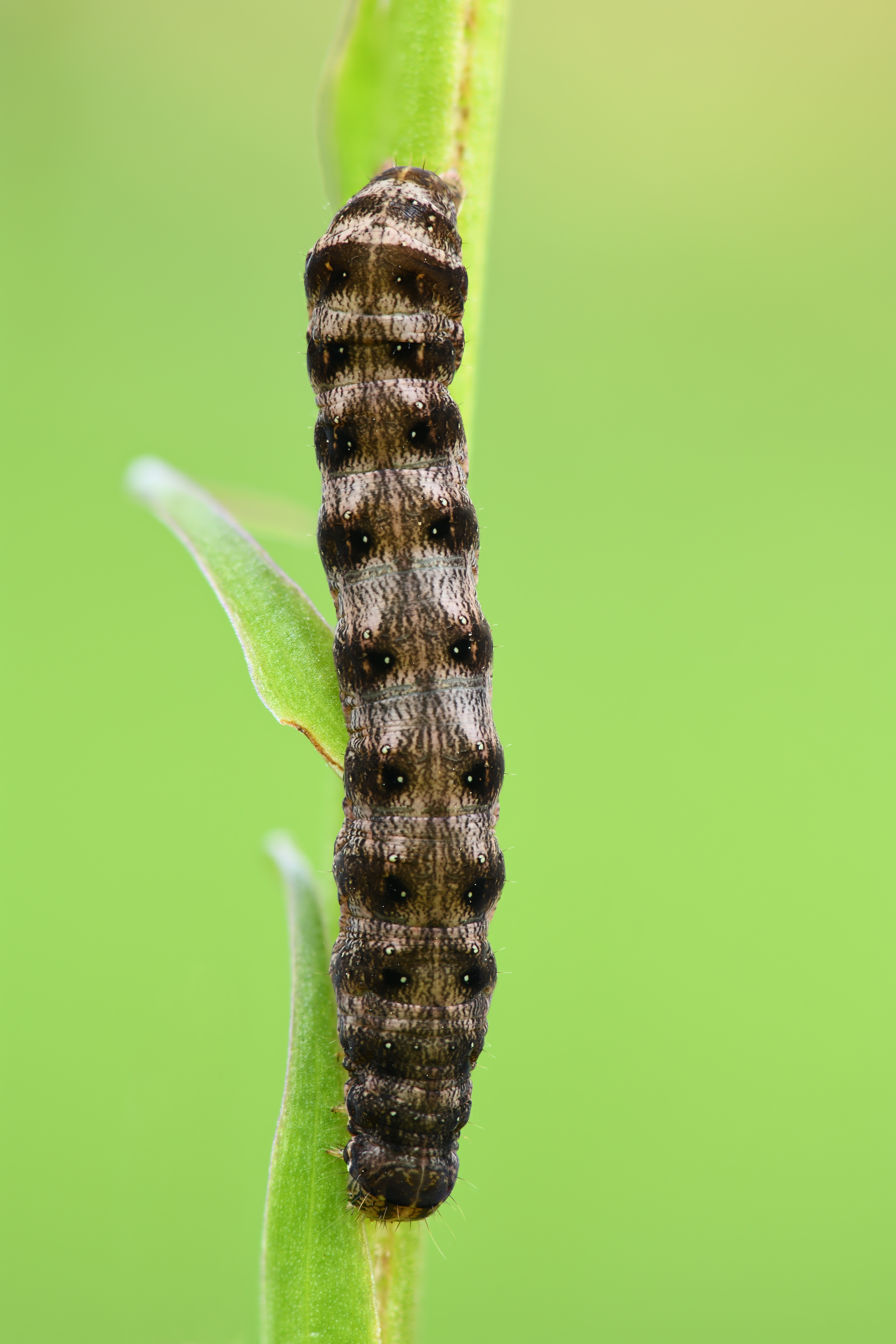
Caterpillar

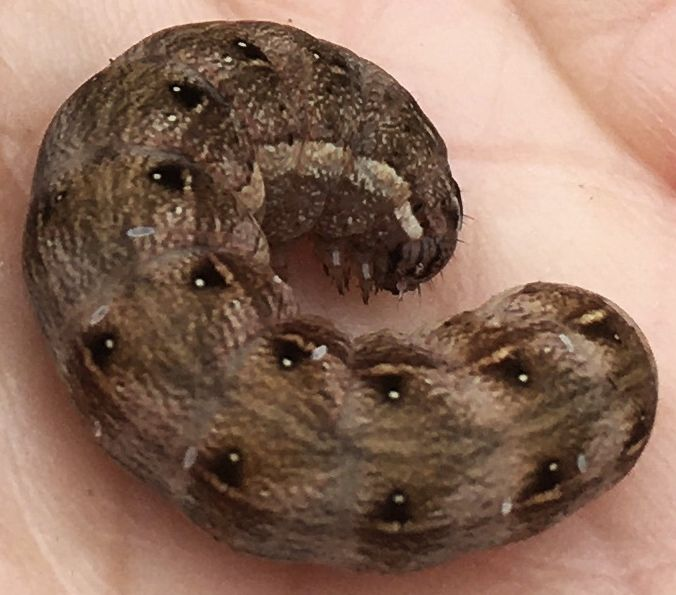
Younger caterpillar
