= Cerastis gloriosa =

Scientific classification
- Kingdom: Animalia
- Phylum: Arthropoda
- Clade: Pancrustacea
- Class: Insecta
- Order: Lepidoptera
- Superfamily: Noctuoidea
- Family: Noctuidae
- Tribe: Noctuini
- Subtribe: Noctuina
- Genus: Cerastis
- Species: C. gloriosa

Binomial name
- Cerastis gloriosa L. G. Crabo & Lafontaine, 1997

Species of moth

Cerastis gloriosa is a species of cutworm or dart moth in the family Noctuidae. It is found in North America.
