= Carl Clewing =

German operatic singer, stage and film actor

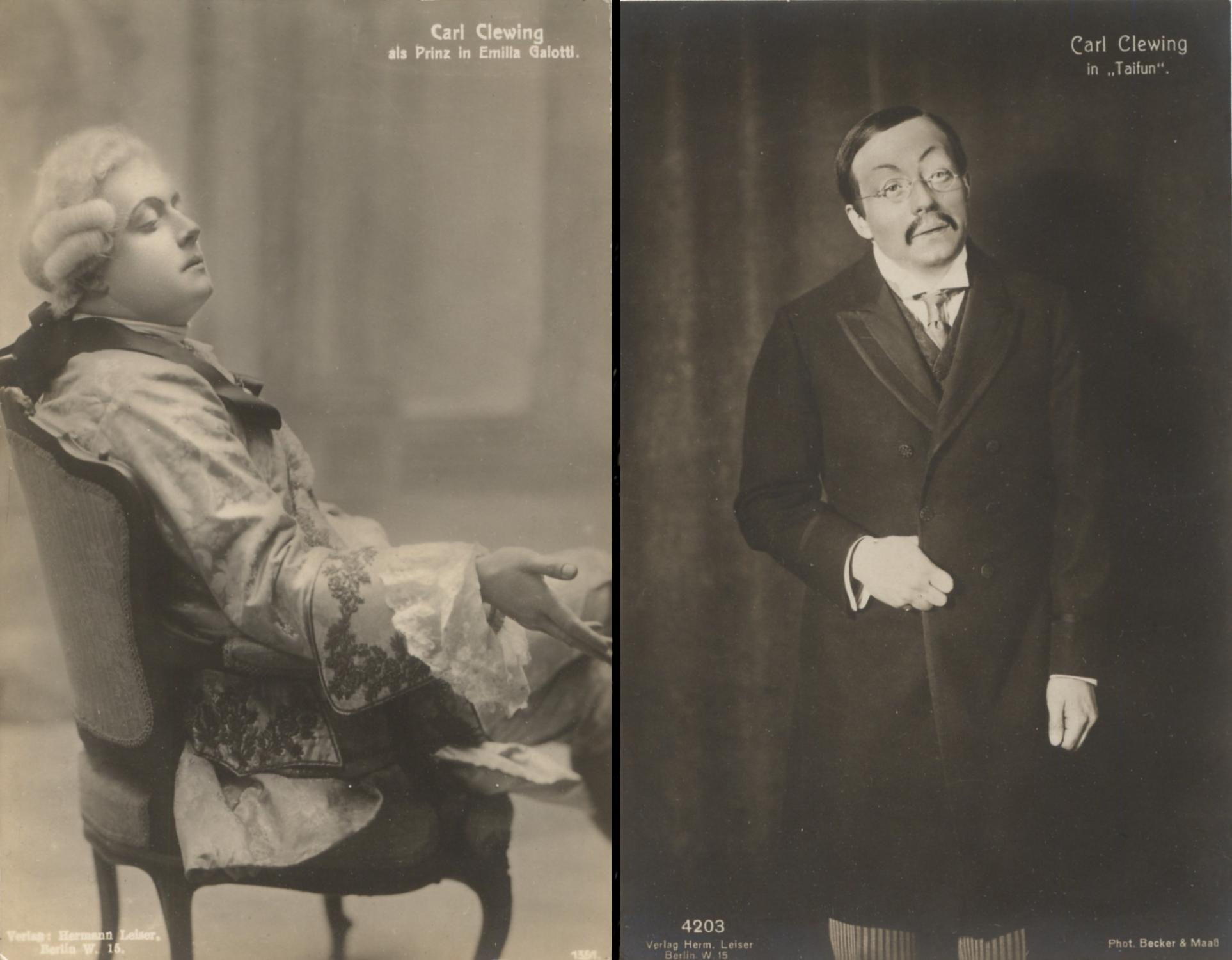
- Clewing in Emilia Galotti and in Taifun c. 1920
- Born: Theodor Rudolph Carl Clewing; 22 April 1884; Schwerin, German Empire
- Died: 15 May 1954 (aged 70); Badenweiler, West Germany
- Education: Burschenschaft
- Occupations: Operatic tenor/heldentenor, stage and film actor, composer and music professor
- Employer: Universität der Künste Berlin
- Spouse: Elisabeth (Else) Mulert (m. 1923; div. 1940)

Theodor Rudolph Carl Clewing (22 April 1884 – 15 May 1954) was a German operatic tenor/heldentenor, stage and film actor, composer of the song Alle Tage ist kein Sonntag and professor at the Universität der Künste Berlin.

== Life ==
Born in Schwerin, Clewing originates from an old Westphalian Schulzengeschlecht, which is first mentioned in documents in 1486 on the Schulte-Klevinghof in the parish Pelkum. In his birthplace Schwerin, his father was the owner of the Löwenapotheke (Lion Pharmacy) there. Clewing studied in Prague and joined the Burschenschaft there, Constantia, which was absorbed into the Munich fraternity Sudetia in 1952. From 1909 he was an actor in Berlin and in 1911 he was appointed as a royal court actor, in the same year he made his film debut as a film actor in Der fremde Vogel. At the outbreak of World War I he volunteered, was first runner and at the end of 1914 he belonged to the parliamentary group under the leadership of Achim von Arnim which called on Reims to hand over the theatre. Rudolf Binding has literally processed this episode in the story Wir fordern Reims zur Ubergabe auf. Later Clewing was also a fighter pilot and got to know Hermann Göring. During the war he was awarded several times and promoted to lieutenant.

Because of his artistic activity in front of front- and invalids troops of the Central Powers (see below Awards) he was active after the war again in Berlin as an opera singer but also as a film actor. In 1922 he became a guest lecturer and professor at the state conservatory of the Hochschule für Staats- & Wirtschaftswissenschaften in Detmold. In autumn 1922 he had an engagement as a heldentenor at the Staatsoper Unter den Linden. In 1924/25 he took part in the Bayreuth Festival and sang Walter von Stolzing and Parsifal. In December 1928 he was appointed associate professor for singing, voice training & practical phonetics at the Hochschule für Musik in Wien. At the beginning of 1931 he moved back to Germany to the Hirschfelde Manor near Werneuchen. Shortly thereafter he was appointed professor at the Berlin University of the Arts and was at the same time representative of the Genossenschaft Deutscher Bühnenangehöriger in the school office of the Deutscher Bühnenverein as well as member of the examination board Berlin for opera & drama and moved to Berlin-Lichterfelde-Ost.

After the Nazis seizure of control Clewing was a member of the NSDAP from May 1933, the SA and the SS. He was expelled in 1934, however, because he had lost his non "Aryan" status and his former affiliation to a masonic lodge.

In the second half of the 1930s, Clewing, who was also a passionate hunter and collector of hunting culture, was taken over by the then Reichsjägermeister Göring was commissioned to publish the series Monuments of German Hunting Culture. The first volume, Musik und Jägerei, was already published in 1937, as well as a popular edition 100 Jägerlieder and a Liederbuch der Luftwaffe. During this time he also developed a small form of the Fürst-Pless-Horn, which is also called Clewing's Pocket Hunting Horn in his memory.

On 27 May 1938, Clewing gave a lecture on the subject of Singing and Speaking at the Reichsmusiktage. It was not until May 1939 that he succeeded in returning as an opera singer. In the same year he wrote a cantata on the birth of Edda Göring.

After the Second World War, Clewing lived in the sanatorium in Glotterbad near Freiburg im Breisgau and spent his retirement in a spa in Badenweiler where he died in 1954 aged 70.

In the Soviet occupation zone his writings Liederbuch der Luftwaffe (published in association with Hans Felix Husadel, 1939) and Adlerliederheft. Feldausgabe des Liederbuches der Luftwaffe (1941) were placed on the list of literature to be excluded.

== Family ==
In 1923 Clewing married Elisabeth (Else) née Mulert in Berlin, adopted Arnhold, and widowed Kunheim, from whom he divorced in 1940. They had one son, Carl Peter (1924-1943, killed in action by Salerno).

== Filmography ==
- 1911: Der fremde Vogel
- 1913: Die Heldin von St. Honorée
- 1913: Der Ring des schwedischen Reiters
- 1913: Ein Sommernachtstraum in unserer Zeit
- 1914: Der Flug in die Sonne
- 1917: Die Richterin
- 1920: Whitechapel. Eine Kette von Perlen und Abenteuern
- 1920: Sumurun
- 1920: The Raft of the Dead

== Memberships ==
- Cooperative of German Stage Owners
- Prague Fraternity Constantia ca. 1904
- Masonic Lodge "Durability" (1906)
- Berliner Burschenschaft der Märker SS 1920 Altherrenverband der Berliner Burschenschaft Franconia, Berlin 1928.
- Burschenschaft Saxonia Hannoversch-Münden SS 1923 (as founding member)
- Fraternity Arminia Vienna WS 1927

== Awards ==
- Iron cross (1914) II. und I. Klasse
- Wound Badge (1918)
- Golden medal of honor with swords of the House Order of Hohenzollern
- Golden medal for art & science on the ribbon of the House Order of Hohenzollern
- Military Merit Cross (Mecklenburg-Schwerin)
- Friedrich-August-Kreuz II and I. Class
- Saxe-Ernestine House Order II. Class with swords
- Cross for Merit in War
- War Merit Cross (Lippe)
- Lippischer Hausorden II. Class with swords
- Officer's Cross of Honor with swords a. R.
- Prussian medal for art & science at war
- Morian neck cross of the (Austrian) German Order of Knights
- Bulgarian Knight's Cross with K. on Ribbon and Order of Bravery
- Militär-Verdienstorden (Bulgarien), Commandeur
- Order of the Medjidie Grand Officer with star
- Gallipoli Star
- Spanish Order of Alphonse XIII; Star
- Legion of Honour
