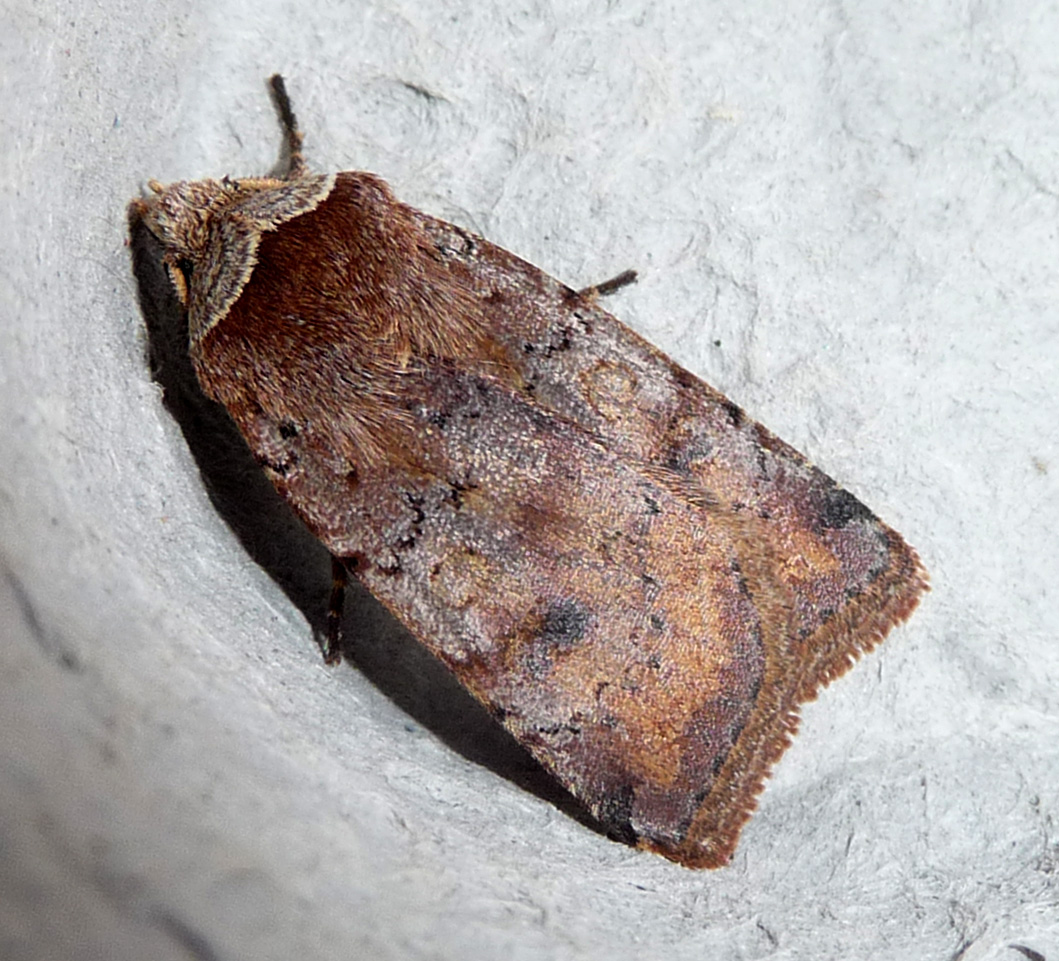

Scientific classification
- Domain: Eukaryota
- Kingdom: Animalia
- Phylum: Arthropoda
- Class: Insecta
- Order: Lepidoptera
- Superfamily: Noctuoidea
- Family: Noctuidae
- Genus: Cerastis
- Species: C. faceta

Binomial name
- Cerastis faceta (Treitschke, 1835)

Synonyms
- Noctua faceta Treitschke, 1835; Orthosia amicta Donzel, 1847; Noctua variicollis Delahaye, 1886; Cerastis faceta ab. livida Bytinski-Salz, 1937

= Cerastis faceta =

Species of moth

Cerastis faceta is a moth of the family Noctuidae. It was described by Treitschke in 1835. It is found in Morocco, Algeria, Tunisia, Spain, Portugal, France, Italy, as well as on Corsica, Sardinia, Malta and Sicily.

The wingspan is 30–32 mm. Adults are on wing from February to April.

The larvae are polyphagous on low-growing plants, including Taraxacum and Lactuca species. They feed by night and rest underground by day.
