= The Raft of the Dead =

1921 film directed by Carl Boese

- Directed by: Carl Boese
- Written by: Karl Figdor
- Produced by: Benzion Fett
- Starring: Aud Egede-Nissen; Otto Gebühr; Frida Richard; Grete Hollmann
- Cinematography: Hans Karl Gottschalk; Mutz Greenbaum
- Production company: Bavaria Film
- Distributed by: Bavaria Film
- Release date: 4 March 1921
- Country: Germany
- Languages: Silent; German intertitles

The Raft of the Dead (German: Das Floss der Toten) is a 1921 German silent drama film directed by Carl Boese and starring Aud Egede-Nissen, Otto Gebühr, and Frida Richard. It premiered in Munich on 4 March 1921.

== Cast ==
- Frida Richard
- Aud Egede-Nissen
- Otto Gebühr
- Grete Hollmann
- Albert Patry
- Carl Clewing
- Hester Harvey

== Bibliography ==
- Grange, William (2008). Cultural Chronicle of the Weimar Republic. Lanham, MD: Scarecrow Press. ISBN 978-0-8108-5967-8.
