= Cerastis cornuta =

Scientific classification
- Kingdom: Animalia
- Phylum: Arthropoda
- Clade: Pancrustacea
- Class: Insecta
- Order: Lepidoptera
- Superfamily: Noctuoidea
- Family: Noctuidae
- Genus: Cerastis
- Species: C. cornuta

Binomial name
- Cerastis cornuta (Grote, 1874)

Species of moth

Cerastis cornuta is a species of cutworm or dart moth in the family Noctuidae.

The MONA or Hodges number for Cerastis cornuta is 10995.
