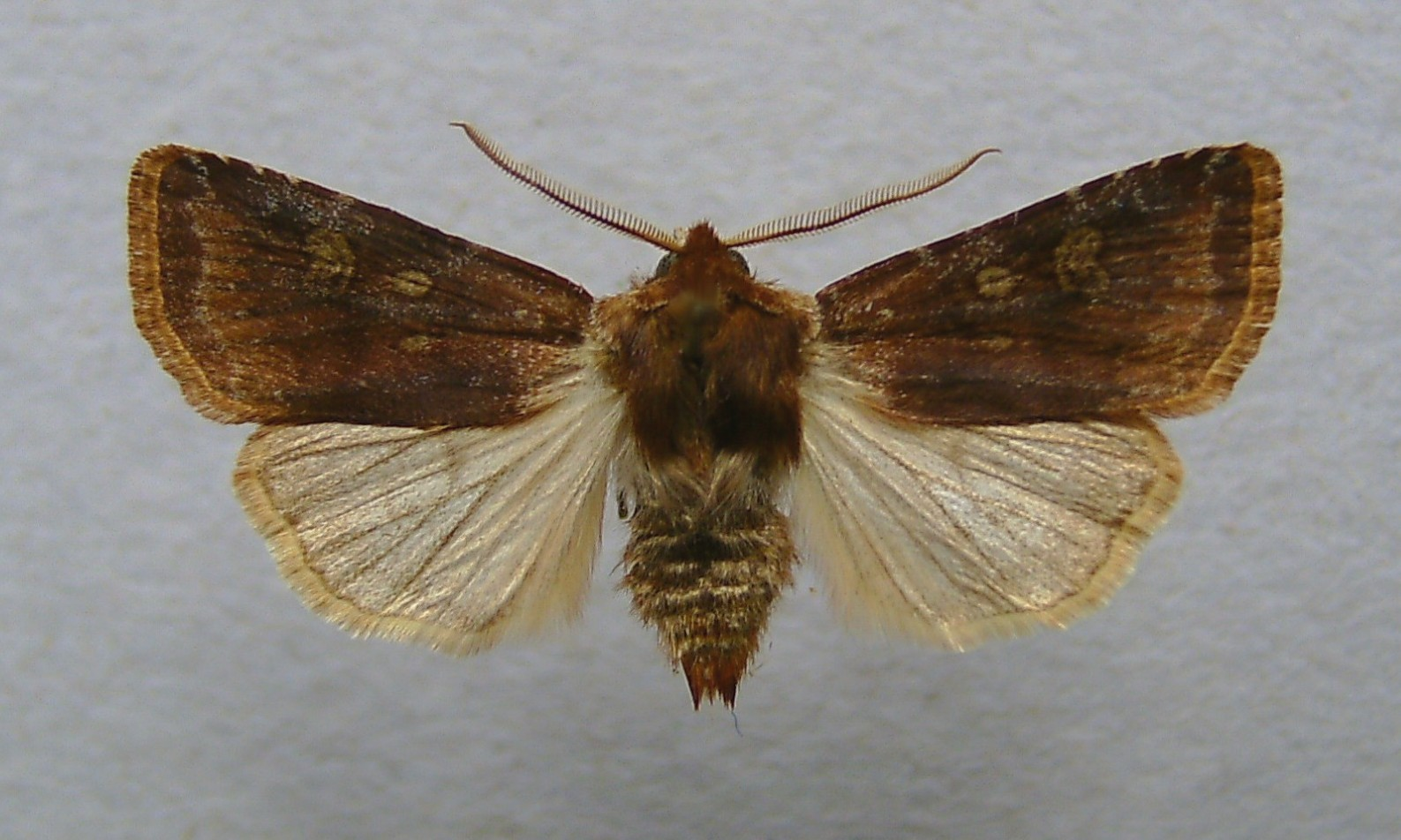

Scientific classification
- Domain: Eukaryota
- Kingdom: Animalia
- Phylum: Arthropoda
- Class: Insecta
- Order: Lepidoptera
- Superfamily: Noctuoidea
- Family: Noctuidae
- Genus: Cerastis
- Species: C. leucographa

Binomial name
- Cerastis leucographa (Denis & Schiffermüller, 1775)

Synonyms
- Noctua leucographa Schiffermüller, 1775; Cerastis cervina Hübner, 1821; Noctua lepetitii Boisduval, 1837

= Cerastis leucographa =

Species of moth

Cerastis leucographa, the white-marked, is a moth of the family Noctuidae. The species was first described by Michael Denis and Ignaz Schiffermüller in 1775. It is found in most of Europe, east to Russia, through the Palearctic up to Japan.

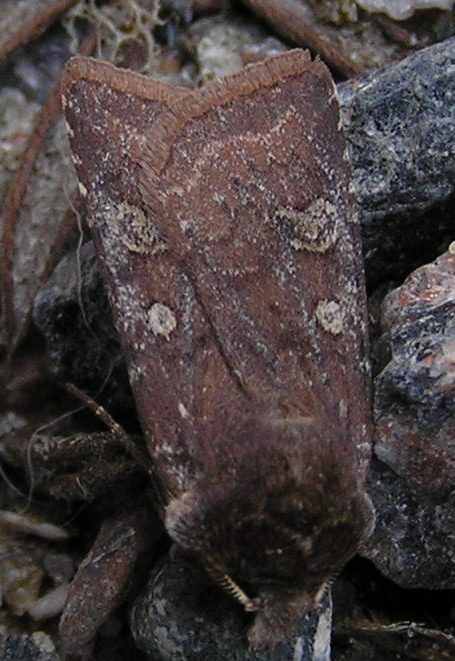

== Description ==
Forewing pale brick red; the median and narrow terminal area brown; upper stigmata prominently pale ochreous grey with dark centres; teeth of outer line very long, the veins dark beyond; hindwing dirty grey; veins and a diffuse terminal shade darker — lepetitii Bsd. is wholly red brown, without the pale submarginal band, the stigmata without pale edging; — suffusa Tutt is an extreme form in which the dark median shade is expanded to cover the whole forewing, making it deep blackish red; — rufa Tutt is pale bright red, much paler than the type. — Larva green or reddish, with darker mottling; dorsal and subdorsal lines pale; a row of dark lateral oblique stripes; spiracular line pale greenish.

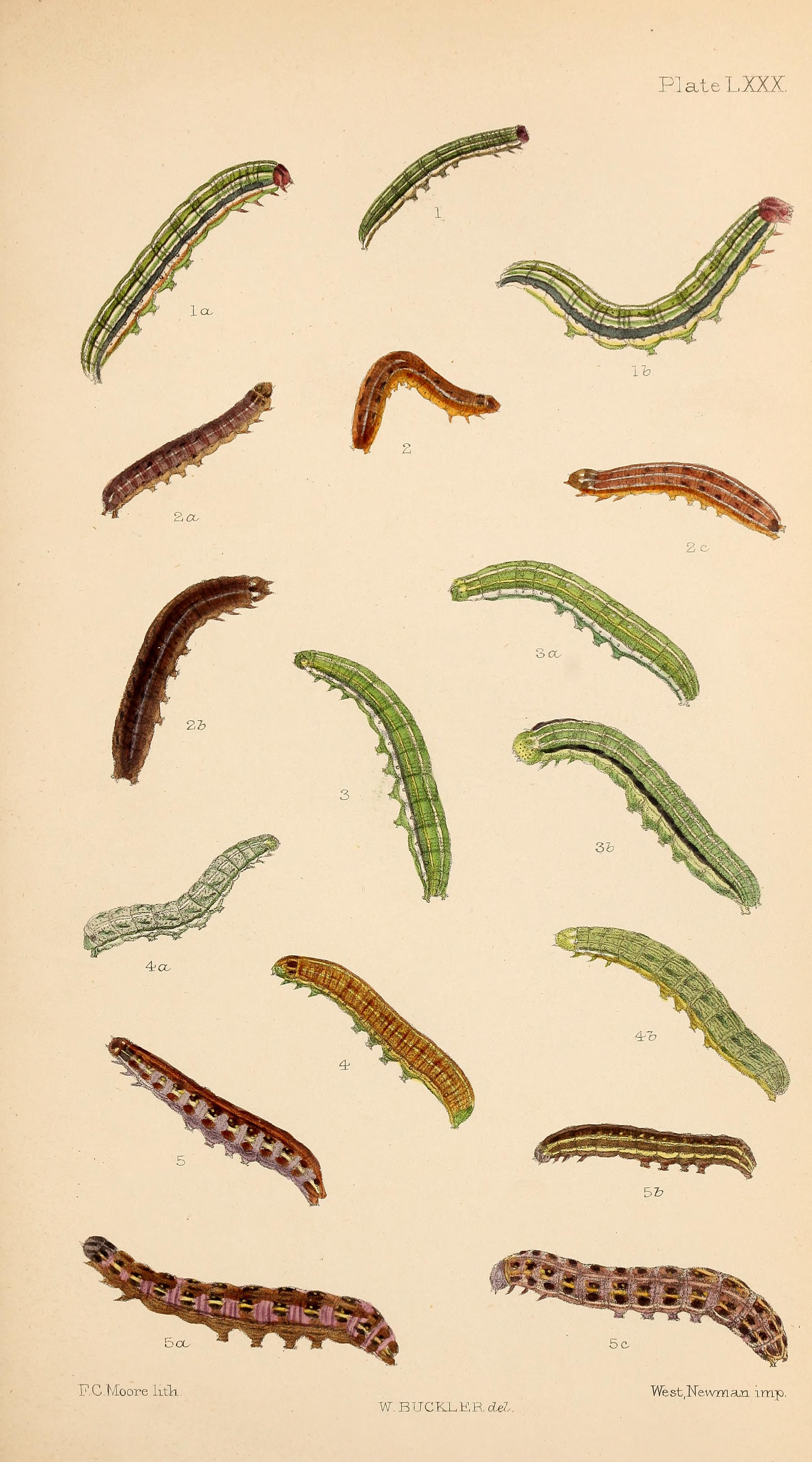
Figs. 4, 4a, 4b larva after last moult

== Biology ==
Adults are on wing from March to June depending on the location. It occurs up to about 1500 meters altitude. It is found in different habitats, for example in mixed forest edges, clearings, bushy valleys, forest bogs and moors. There is one generation per year whose moths fly from March to May. They are dusk and nocturnal and visit artificial light sources and the bait. They suck on flowering catkins, their very early flight time runs largely parallel to the willow blossom (Salix).

The larvae feed on Vaccinium myrtillus, Prunus spinosa and Salix, Rumex, Rhinanthus and Galium species.
