= Ellingen (Prenzlau) =

- Village of Prenzlau
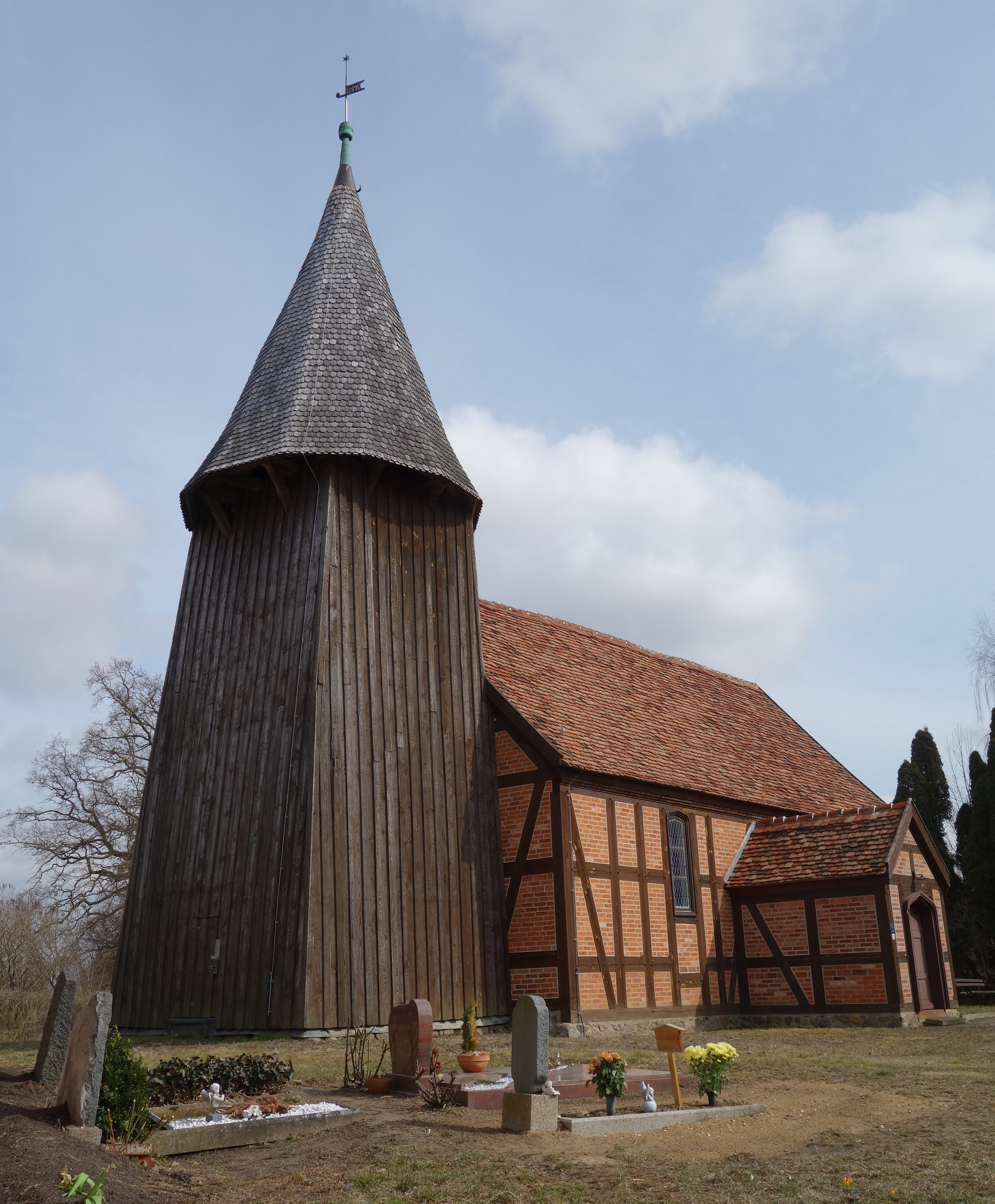
- Village church
- Interactive map of Ellingen
- Location within Germany Location within Brandenburg
- Coordinates: 53°20′56″N 13°49′55″E
- Country: Germany
- State: Brandenburg
- District: Uckermark
- Town: Prenzlau

Area
  - Total: 0.26 km^{2} (0.10 sq mi)
- Elevation: 25 m (82 ft)

Population (2008)
  - Total: 90
  - Density: 350/km^{2} (900/sq mi)
- Time zone: UTC+01:00 (CET)
  - Summer (DST): UTC+02:00 (CEST)
- Postal codes: 17291
- Dialling codes: 039853

Ellingen is a small village in the northeast of the federated state of Brandenburg, Germany. The village is part of the Dedelow section (Ortsteil) of the city of Prenzlau, in the District (Landkreis) of Uckermark. With just 90 inhabitants, it is one of the smallest villages in Prenzlau.

== History ==
Ellingen was first mentioned in 1285 as owned by "Otto of Ellinge". Slavic settlements preceded the village's founding. During the Middle Ages, Ellingen belonged to the Arnim family. Later, the village came into the possession of the city of Prenzlau. In 1961, the village of Ellingen was incorporated in the Dedelow section of Prenzlau.
