= Prenzlau =

- Town
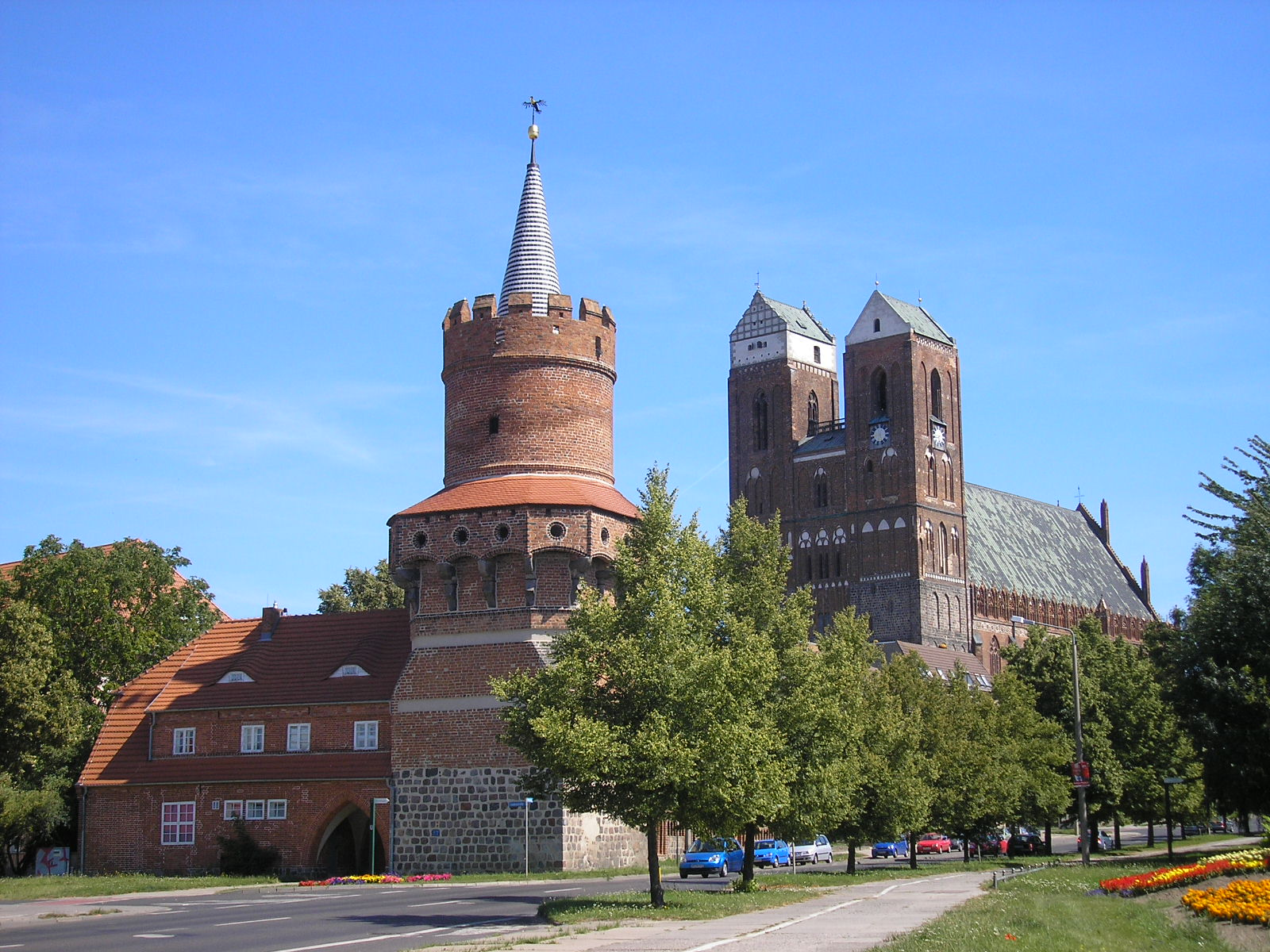
- Medieval town gate Mitteltor and St Mary Church

- Coat of arms

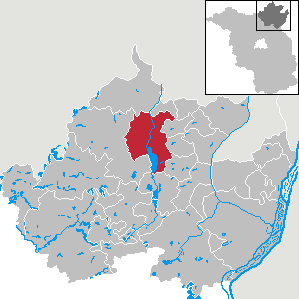
- Location of Prenzlau within Uckermark district
- Interactive map of Prenzlau
- Location within Germany Location within Brandenburg
- Coordinates: 53°19′N 13°52′E
- Country: Germany
- State: Brandenburg
- District: Uckermark
- Subdivisions: 24 Ortsteile

Government
  - Mayor (2017–25): Hendrik Sommer

Area
  - Total: 142.96 km^{2} (55.20 sq mi)
- Elevation: 30 m (98 ft)

Population (2025-12-31)
  - Total: 18,779
  - Density: 131.36/km^{2} (340.22/sq mi)
- Time zone: UTC+01:00 (CET)
  - Summer (DST): UTC+02:00 (CEST)
- Postal codes: 17291
- Dialling codes: 03984
- Vehicle registration: UM
- Website: prenzlau.info

Prenzlau (German: [ˈpʁɛntslaʊ]; Low German: Prentzlow) is a town in Brandenburg, in north-eastern Germany, the administrative seat of Uckermark District. It is also the centre of the historic Uckermark region.

== Geography ==
The town is located on the Ucker river, about 100 km (62 mi) north of Berlin. Prenzlau station—which opened in 1863—is a stop on the Angermünde–Stralsund railway line.

== History ==
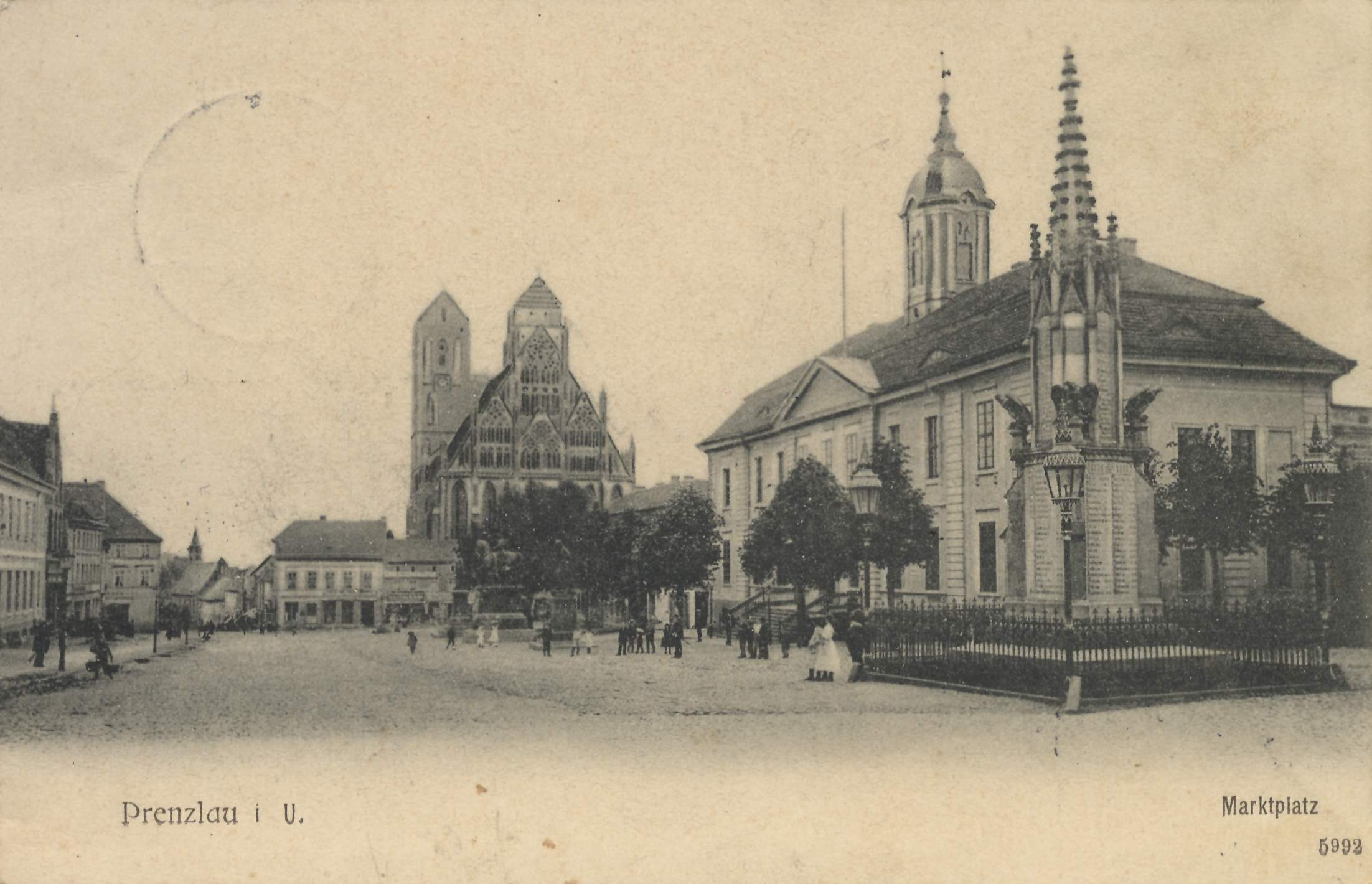
Market Square with the Town Hall in the early 20th century

Settled since Neolithic times, the Prenzlau area from the 7th century AD was the site of several gords erected by the Polabian Slavs called Ukrani. In the late 12th century, the Dukes of Pomerania had the region colonized by Low German settlers.

Prenzlau itself, named after Slavic Premyslaw, was first mentioned in 1187. It received town privileges by Duke Barnim I of Pomerania in 1234. When Duke Barnim signed the Treaty of Landin with the Ascanian margraves of Brandenburg in 1250, Prenzlau was already a fortified town with walls and moats, four parish churches and a monastery. Together with Berlin-Cölln, Frankfurt and Stendal, it ranked among the largest towns in the margraviate.

The Prenzlau and the Uckermark region were devastated during the Thirty Years' War. In 1687, a commune of French Huguenots was established in the town, and an economic recovery started. Also a garrison town, Prenzlau was again ravaged by passing troops during the Seven Years' War and the Napoleonic Wars. In the mid 19th century, several citizens emigrated to Australia, where they founded the town of Prenzlau, Queensland west of Brisbane.

In World War II the Oflag II-A prisoner-of-war camp, mostly for Polish and Belgian officers, was located just south of Prenzlau on the main road to Berlin. A subcamp of the Ravensbrück concentration camp was established in 1943, later relocated to Lindenhagen. The town centre was largely destroyed. The East German authorities had it rebuilt with large panel Plattenbau buildings.

== Demography ==
Development of population since 1875 within the current Boundaries (Blue Line: Population; Dotted Line: Comparison to Population development in Brandenburg state; Grey Background: Time of Nazi Germany; Red Background: Time of communist East Germany)

Recent Population Development and Projections (Population Development before Census 2011 (blue line); Recent Population Development according to the Census in Germany in 2011 (blue bordered line); Official projections for 2005–2030 (yellow line); for 2017–2030 (scarlet line); for 2020–2030 (green line)

Residents by country of birth
Nationality	Population (2022)	
Germany	17,260	91.6%
Poland	535	2.84%
Russia	146	0,77%
Syria	134	0.71%
Afghanistan	121	0.64%

Prenzlau: Population development
within the current boundaries (2020)

Year	Pop.	±% p.a.
1875	18,512	—
1890	20,823	+0.79%
1910	24,327	+0.78%
1925	24,572	+0.07%
1939	27,697	+0.86%
1950	22,960	−1.69%
1964	23,267	+0.09%

Year	Pop.	±% p.a.
1971	24,890	+0.97%
1981	26,020	+0.44%
1985	26,326	+0.29%
1990	25,900	−0.33%
1995	23,847	−1.64%
2000	22,737	−0.95%
2005	20,904	−1.67%

Year	Pop.	±% p.a.
2010	20,078	−0.80%
2015	19,275	−0.81%
2016	19,279	+0.02%
2017	19,110	−0.88%
2018	19,024	−0.45%
2019	18,970	−0.28%
2020	18,849	−0.64%

== Climate ==
Climate data for Prenzlau (Grünow) (1991–2020 normals)
Month	Jan	Feb	Mar	Apr	May	Jun	Jul	Aug	Sep	Oct	Nov	Dec	Year
Mean daily maximum °C (°F)	2.6 (36.7)	3.6 (38.5)	8.0 (46.4)	14.2 (57.6)	18.2 (64.8)	21.8 (71.2)	24.7 (76.5)	24.4 (75.9)	19.6 (67.3)	13.3 (55.9)	7.2 (45.0)	3.6 (38.5)	13.6 (56.5)
Daily mean °C (°F)	0.4 (32.7)	0.8 (33.4)	3.8 (38.8)	8.7 (47.7)	13.0 (55.4)	16.3 (61.3)	18.8 (65.8)	18.7 (65.7)	14.7 (58.5)	9.6 (49.3)	4.9 (40.8)	1.8 (35.2)	9.5 (49.1)
Mean daily minimum °C (°F)	−2.1 (28.2)	−2.1 (28.2)	0.2 (32.4)	3.4 (38.1)	7.1 (44.8)	10.8 (51.4)	13.3 (55.9)	13.4 (56.1)	10.2 (50.4)	6.2 (43.2)	2.3 (36.1)	−0.7 (30.7)	5.2 (41.4)
Average precipitation mm (inches)	32.2 (1.27)	20.8 (0.82)	28.8 (1.13)	22.5 (0.89)	44.1 (1.74)	61.4 (2.42)	72.2 (2.84)	54.2 (2.13)	41.3 (1.63)	35.9 (1.41)	33.6 (1.32)	27.7 (1.09)	489.3 (19.26)
Average precipitation days (≥ 1.0 mm)	15.2	12.5	12.3	10.3	12.6	12.6	13.6	13.2	11.5	13.9	13.9	16.4	160.7
Average relative humidity (%)	87.7	84.2	79.4	71.9	72.7	73.4	70.8	70.2	76.2	84.6	89.9	89.4	79.2
Mean monthly sunshine hours	47.3	72.6	134.4	216.1	241.7	240.7	228.4	218.4	172.6	112.8	50.9	34.4	1,813.1
Source: World Meteorological Organization

== Politics ==
Seats in the town's assembly (Stadtverordnetenversammlung) as of 2026:

- Alternative for Germany (AfD): 9
- Christian Democratic Union (CDU): 8
- Social Democratic Party of Germany (SPD): 5
- The Left: 2
- Wir Prenzlauer (Independent): 2
- Fraktionlos (Independent): 1

== Twin towns – sister cities ==
Prenzlau is twinned with:

- Barlinek, Poland
- Pokhvistnevo, Russia
- Uster, Switzerland
- Varėna, Lithuania

== Notable people ==
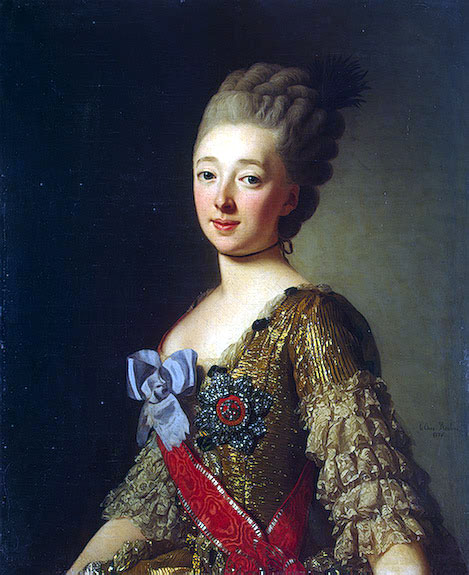
Natalia Alexeievna of Russia in 1776

- René Bielke (born 1962), ice hockey player
- Oscar Florianus Bluemner (1867–1938), American painter
- Wilhelm Grabow (1802–1874), civil servant, judge, and politician
- Jacob Philipp Hackert (1737–1807), landscape painter
- Frederika Louisa of Hesse-Darmstadt (1751–1805), queen consort of Prussia
- Louis I, Grand Duke of Hesse (1753–1830)
- Princess Amalie of Hesse-Darmstadt (1754–1832)
- Princess Wilhelmina Louisa of Hesse-Darmstadt (1755–1776)
- Paul Hirsch (1868–1940), politician
- Hans Felix Husadel (1897–1964), composer and conductor
- Otto Kaiser (1924–2017), Old Testament scholar
- Brigitte Rohde (born 1954), sprinter
- Max von Schenckendorff (1875–1943), general in the Wehrmacht of Nazi Germany
- Ernst Christian Friedrich Schering (1824–1889), apothecary and industrialist
- Johannes Schmidt (1843–1901), linguist
- Christian Friedrich Schwan (1733–1815), publisher and bookseller
- Adolf Wilhelm Theodor Stahr (1805–1876), writer and literary historian
- Christiane Wartenberg (born 1956), athlete
- Clemens Wenzel (born 1988), rower
- Carola Zirzow (born 1954), sprint canoer
- Jens-Uwe Zöphel (born 1969), footballer
- Stefan Zierke (born 1970), politician

== Gallery ==
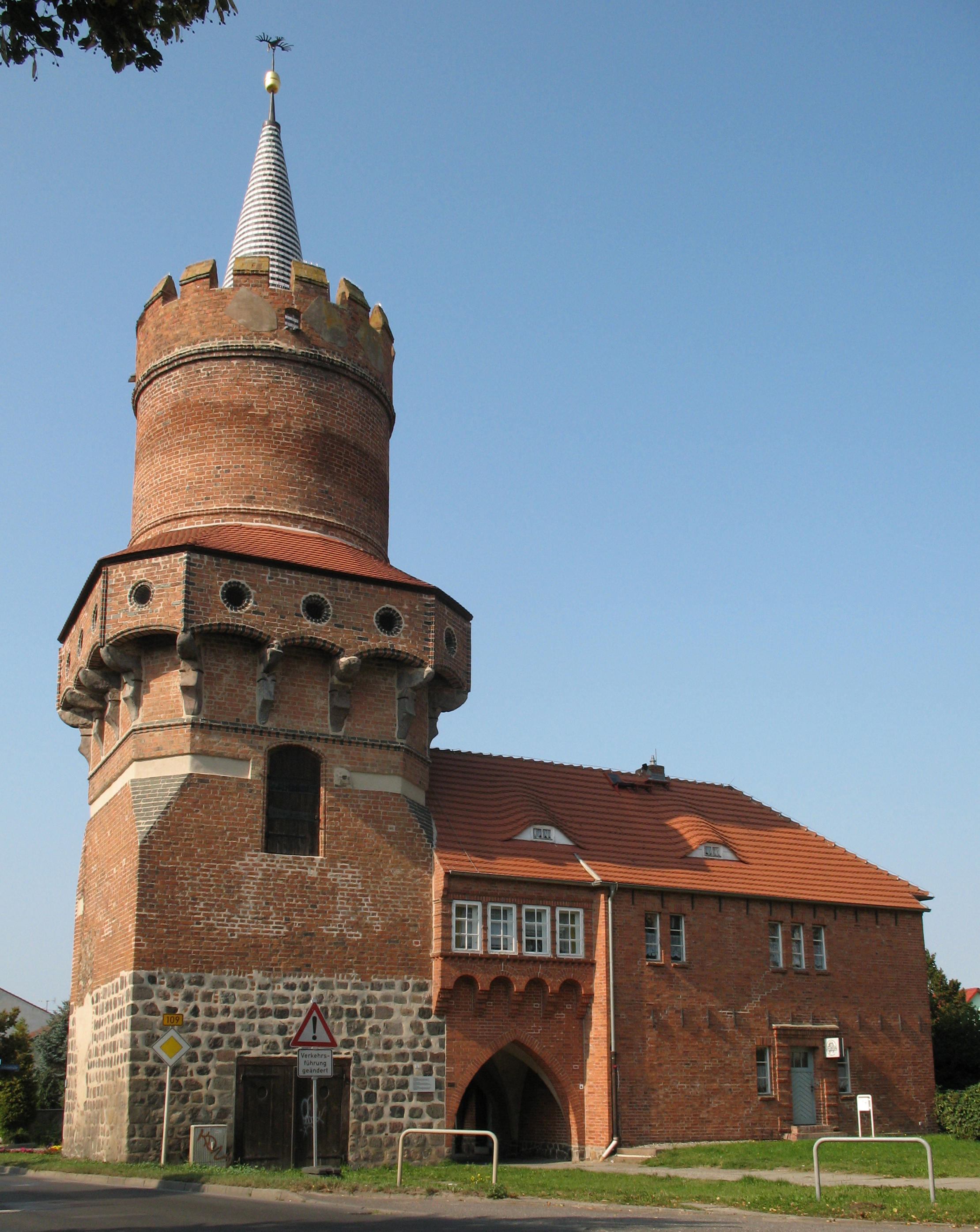
Gate Tower of the Brick Gothic 'Mitteltor'

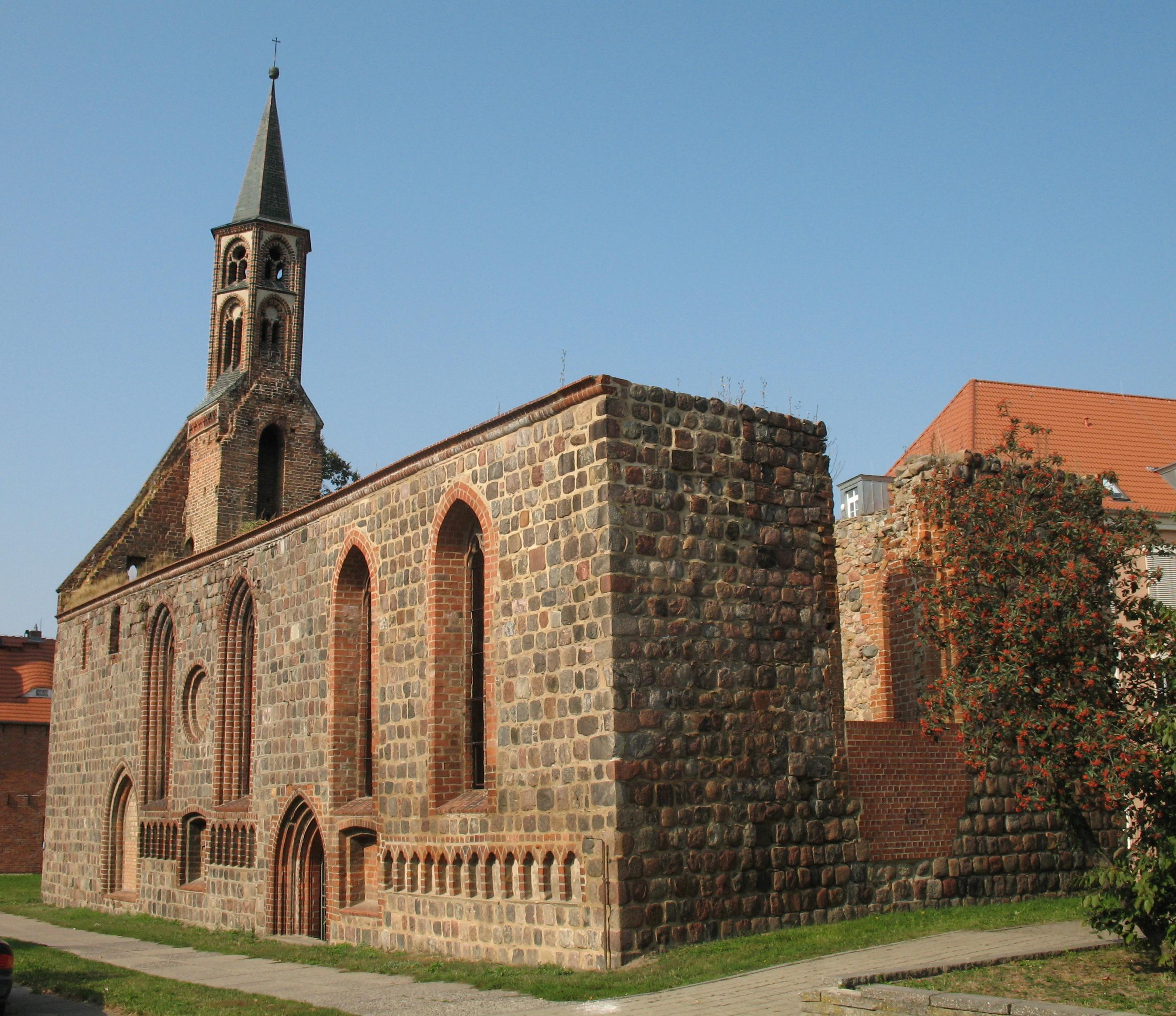
War memorial ruin of the Holy Spirit Church

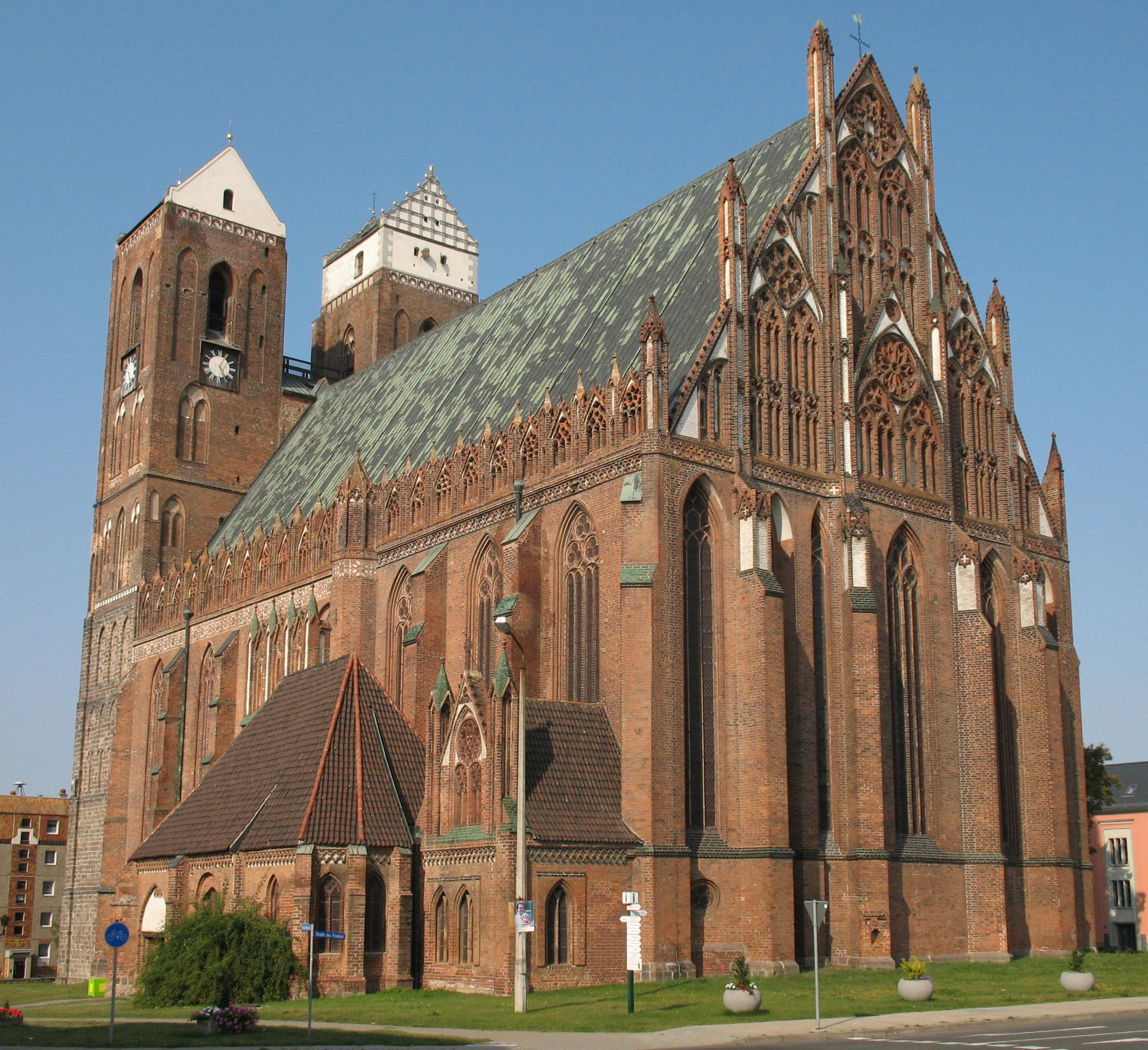
Marienkirche

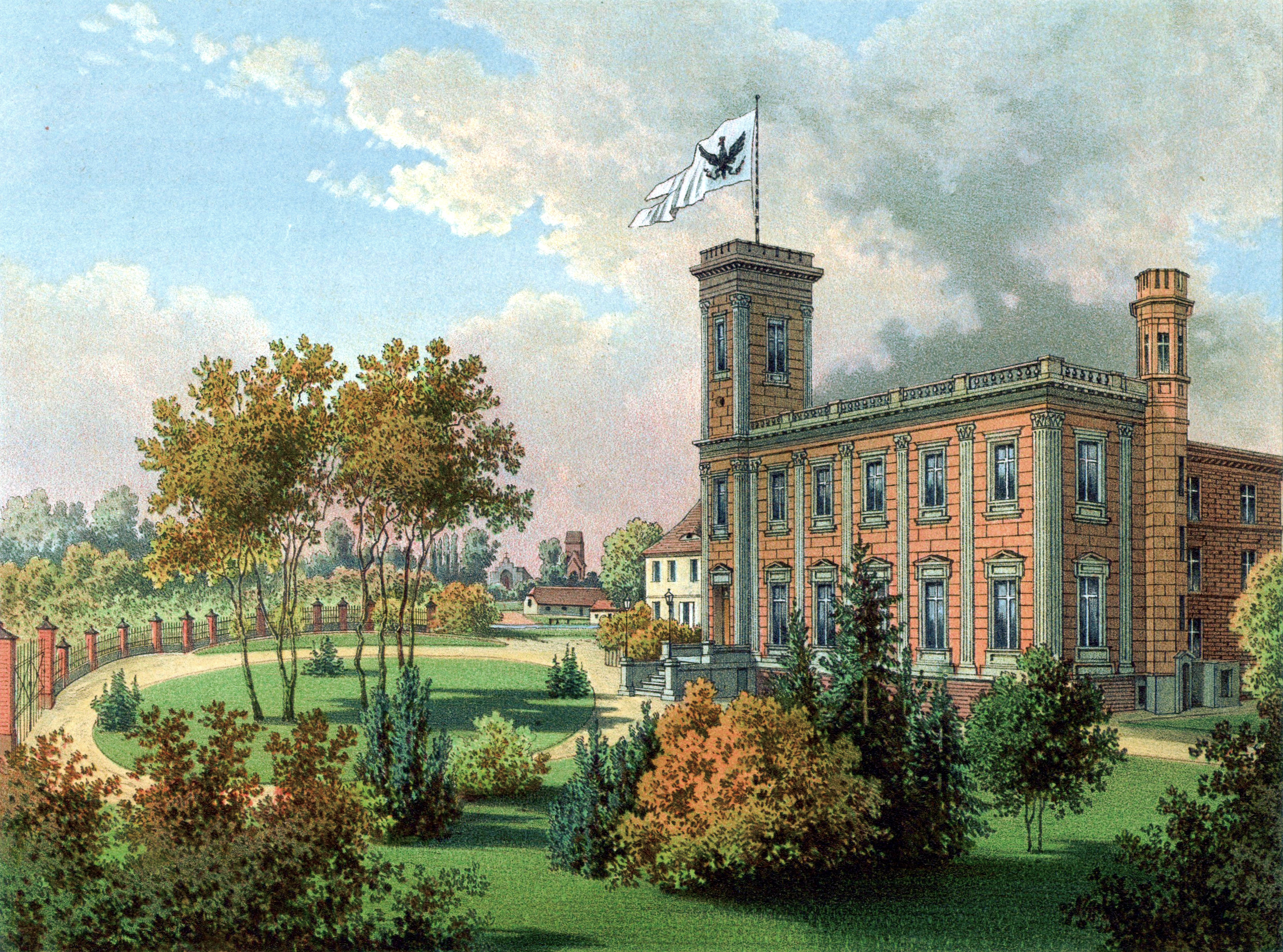
Historical painting of the Dedelow Castle

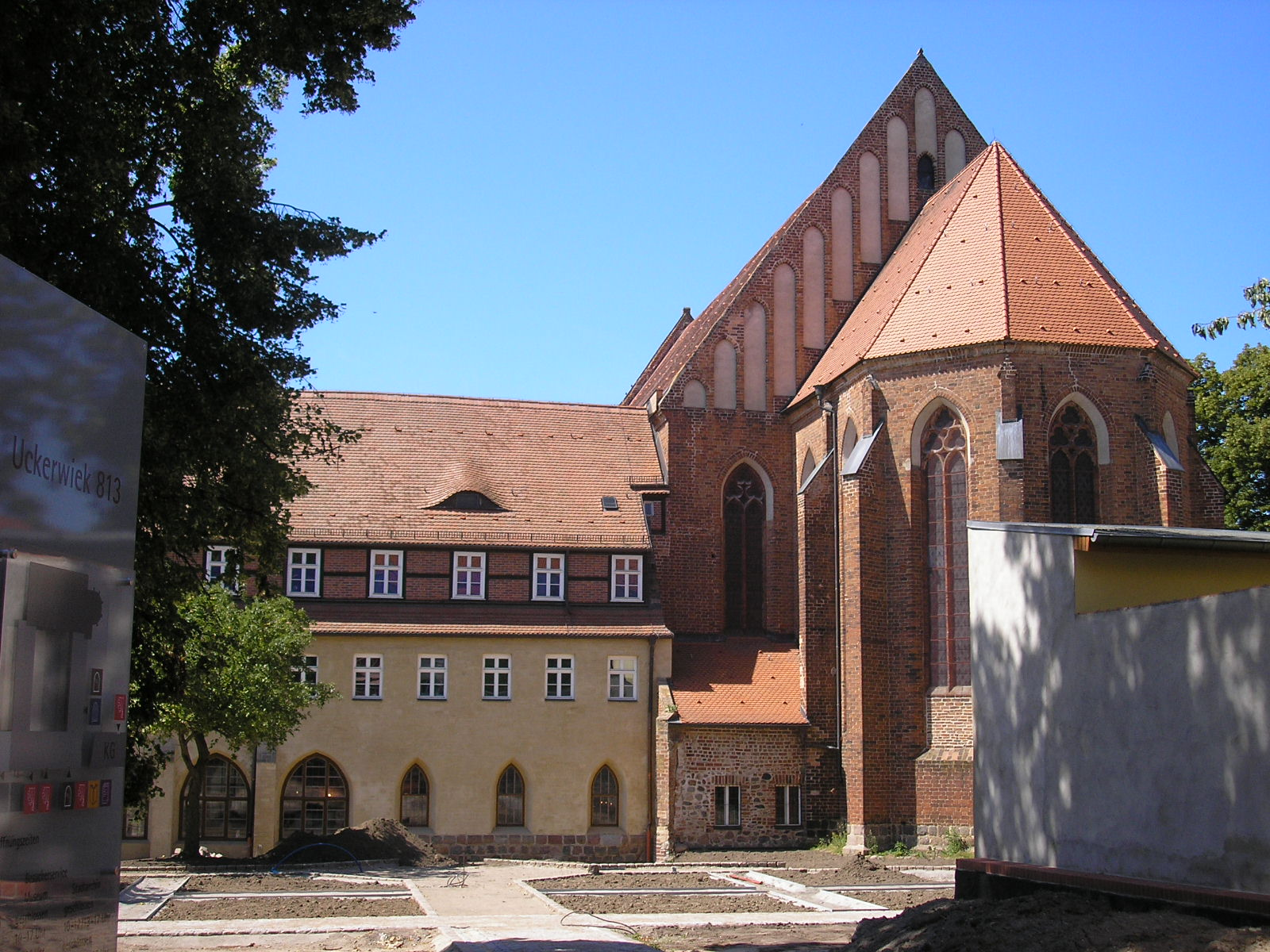
Dominican abbey

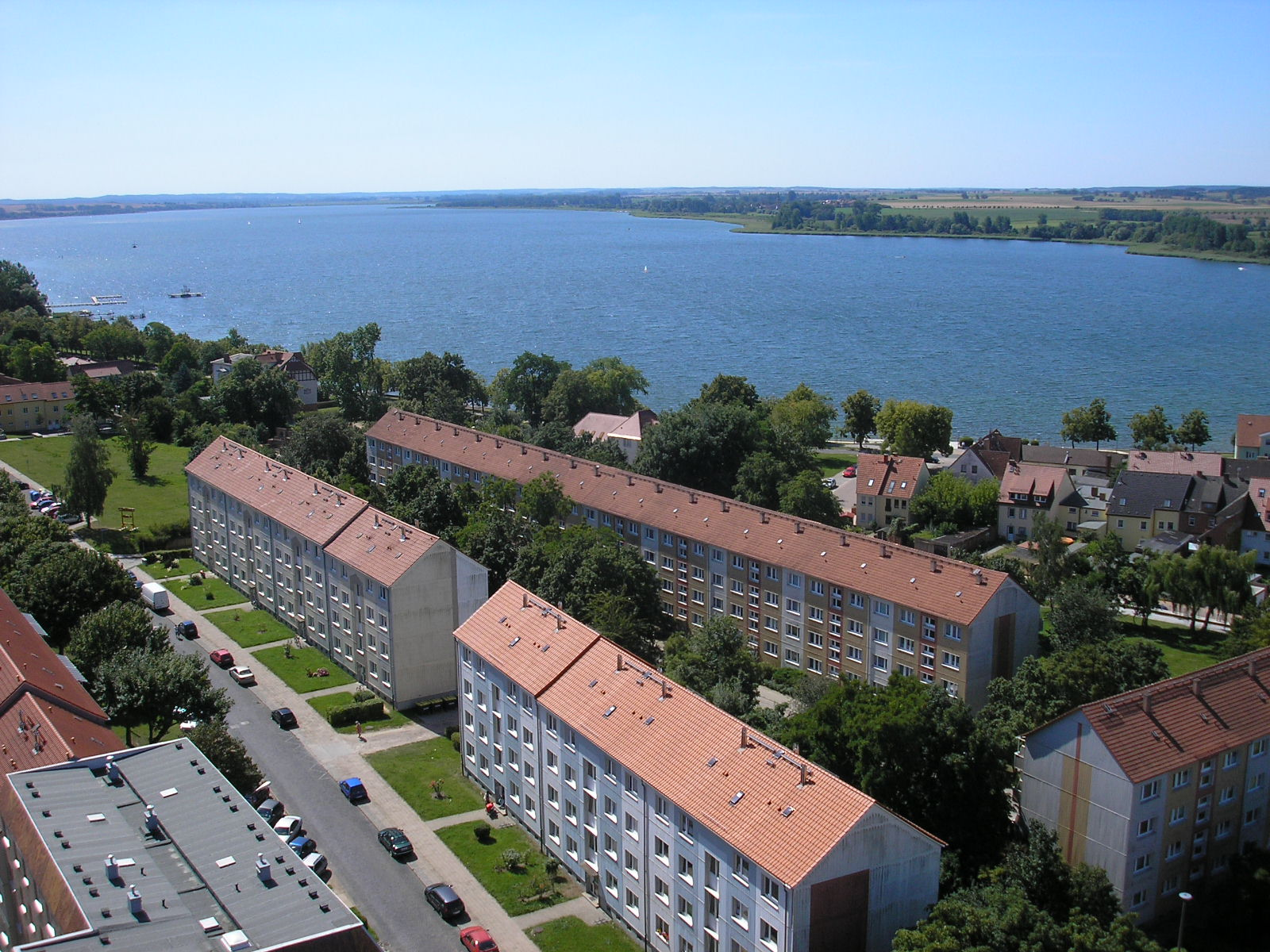
Unterucker Lake

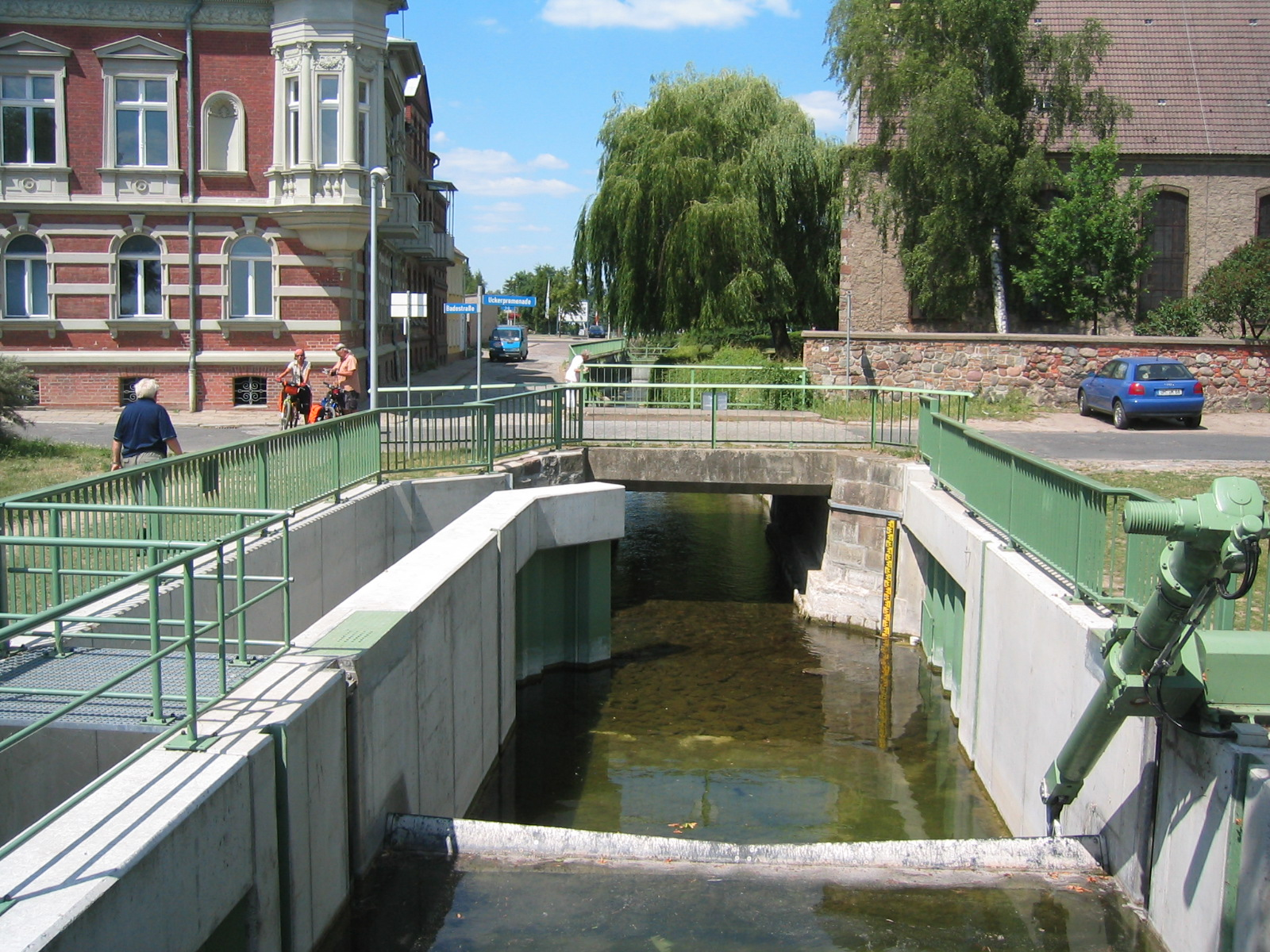
Ucker canal watergate

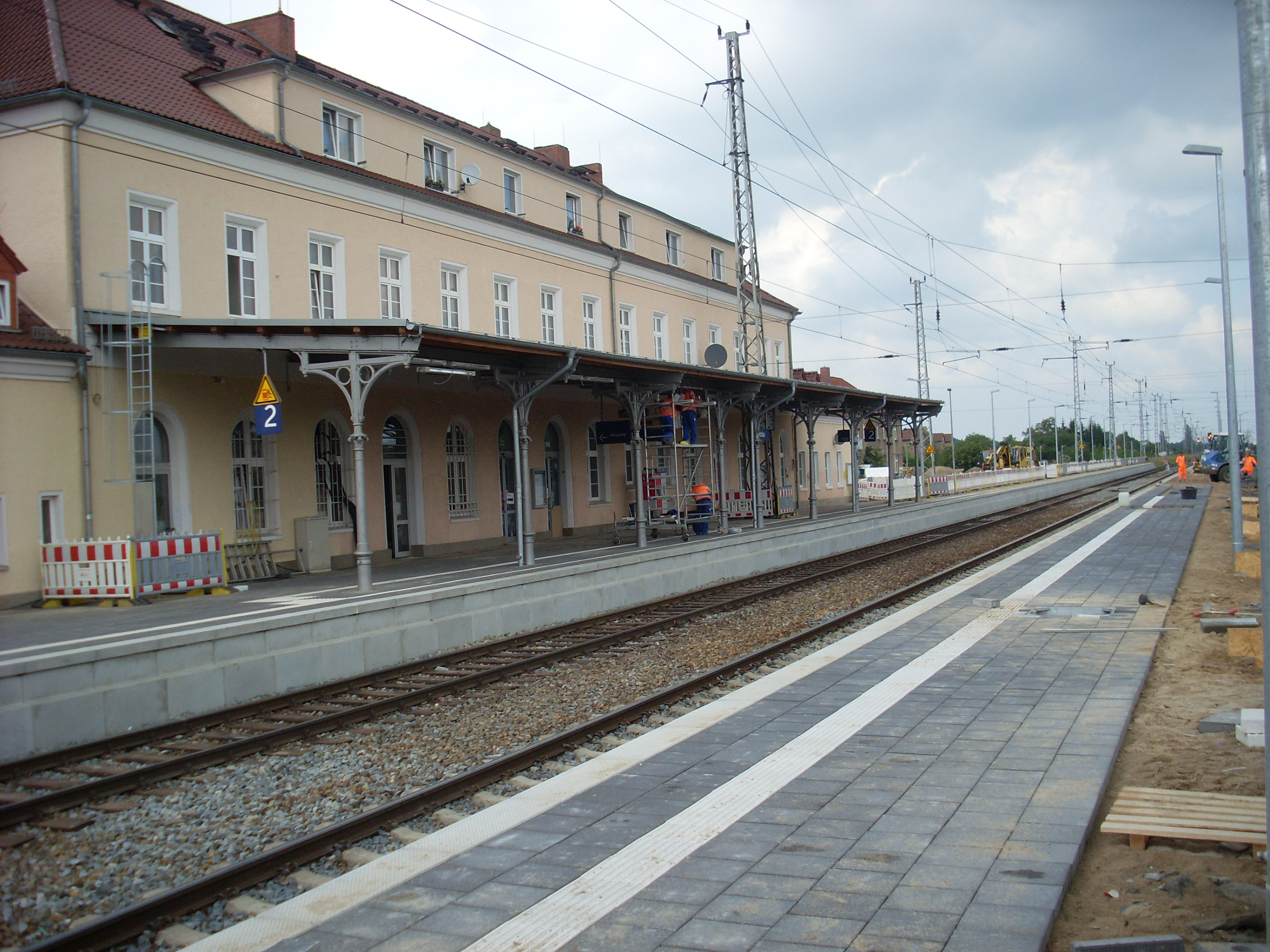
Platform of the train station

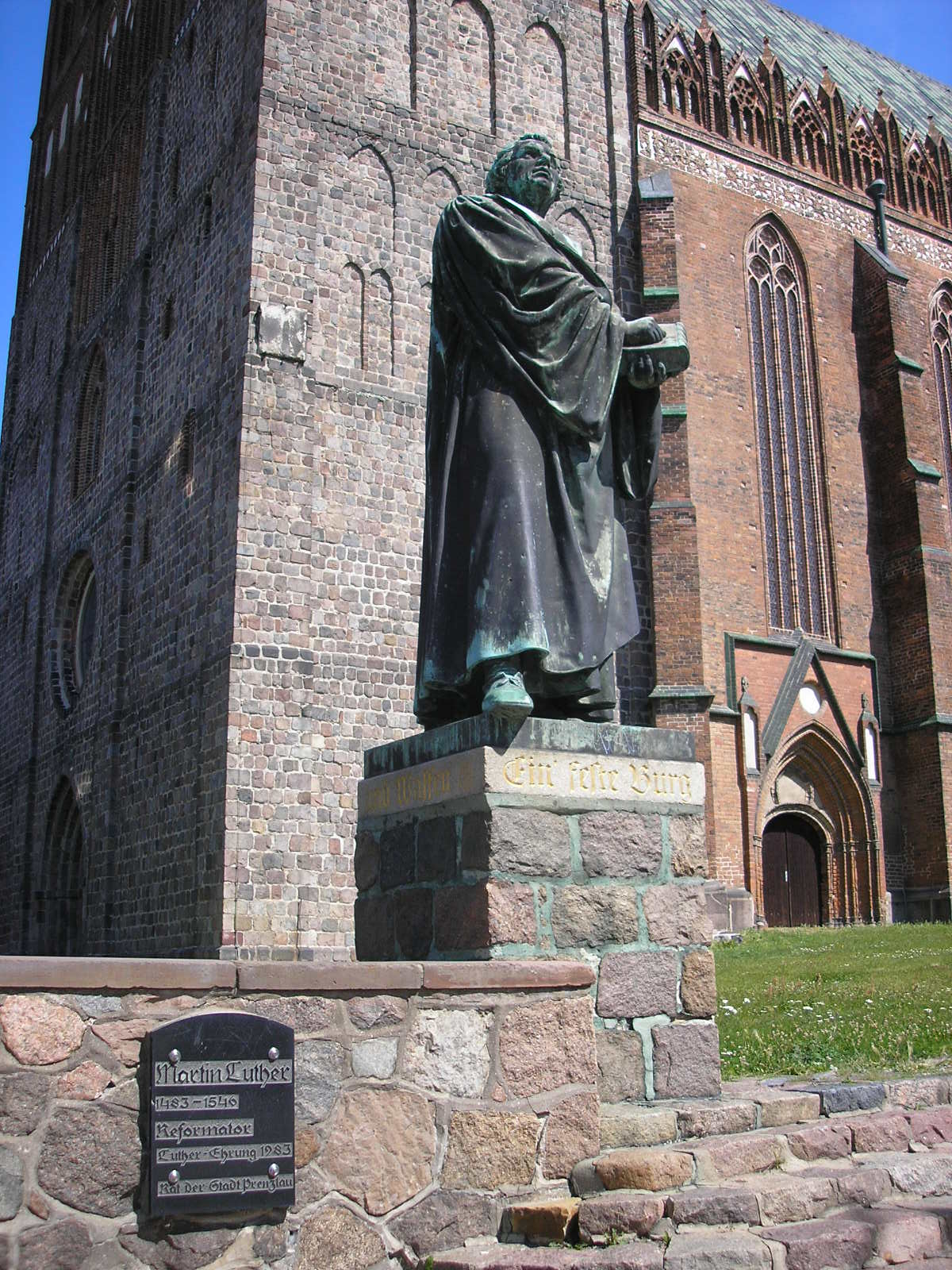
Martin Luther memorial

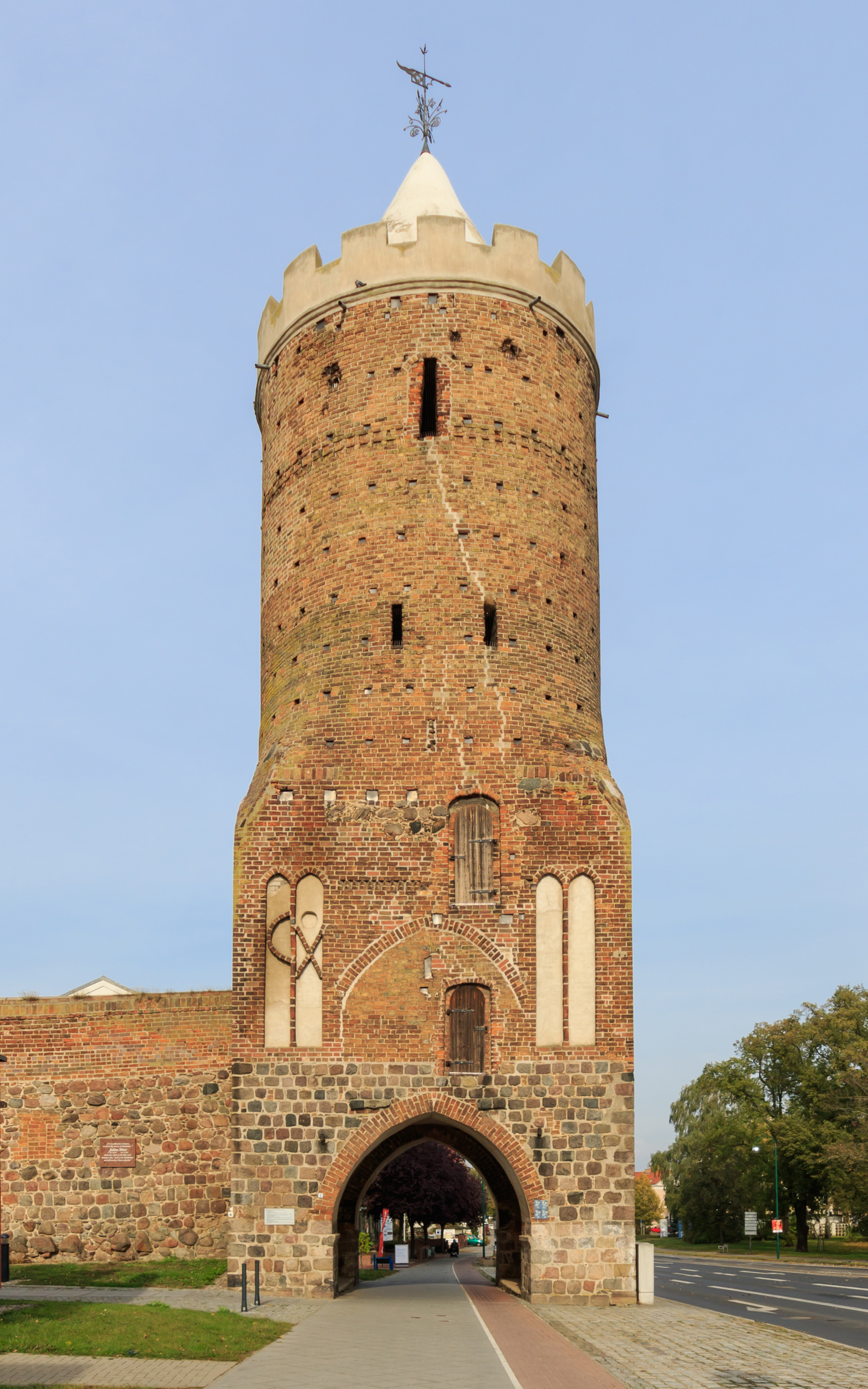
Medieval town wall, gate tower

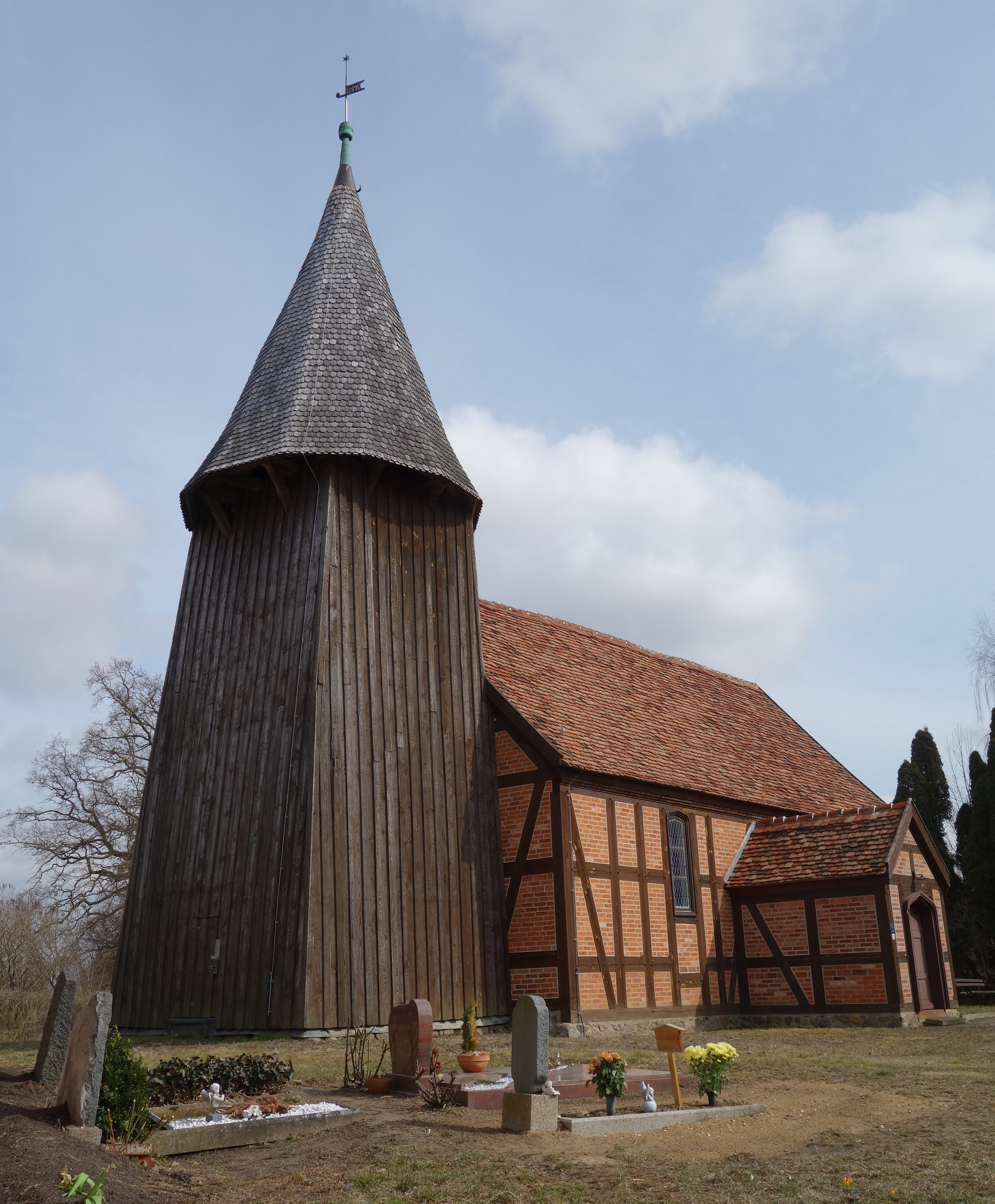
Village church in Ellingen
