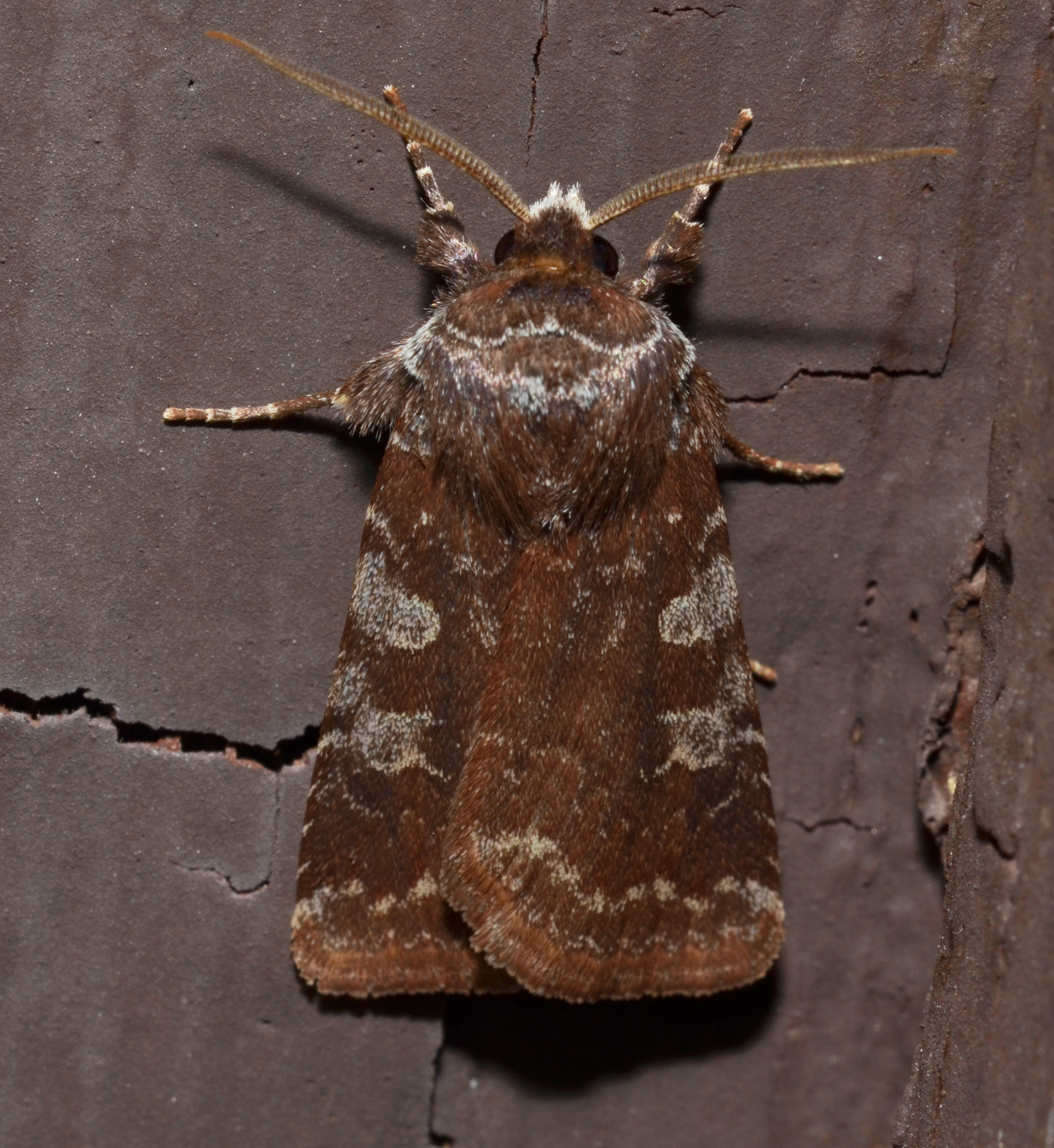

Scientific classification
- Kingdom: Animalia
- Phylum: Arthropoda
- Class: Insecta
- Order: Lepidoptera
- Superfamily: Noctuoidea
- Family: Noctuidae
- Genus: Cerastis
- Species: C. tenebrifera

Binomial name
- Cerastis tenebrifera (Walker, 1865)

Synonyms
- Hadena tenebrifera Walker, 1865; Matuta catherina Grote, 1874; Agrotis manifestolabes Morrison, 1875

= Cerastis tenebrifera =

Reddish speckled dart

Species of moth

Cerastis tenebrifera, the reddish speckled dart, is a moth of the family Noctuidae. It is found from Newfoundland to South Carolina, west to Texas, north to Nebraska and southern Ontario.

The wingspan is 30–40 mm. Adults are on wing from March to June.

Larvae have been reared on Lactuca, Vitis, Taraxacum officinale, Rubus idaeus, Salix petiolaris, Prunus virginiana, Betula papyrifera and Vaccinium myrtilloides.
