= Johan Adam Pollich =

German scientist (1740–1780)

Johan Adam Pollich or Johann (1 January 1741, Kaiserslautern – 24 February 1780) was a German medical doctor, botanist and entomologist.

He studied medicine in Strasbourg, and following graduation he practiced medicine for a short period of time. From 1764 onward he devoted his energies to natural sciences. In 1776 he published the first volume of Historia plantarum in Palatinatu, followed by volumes II & III the next year. Because of its excellent descriptions of plants, this work was highly praised by Pollich's contemporaries.

== Works ==
- 1763: Dissertatio physiologico-medica de nutrimento incremento statu ac decremento corporis humani. 20 S. Argentorati: Heitz (med. Dissertation)
- 1776-1777: Historia plantarum in Palatinatu electorali sponte nascentium incepta, secundum systema sexuale digesta. Bd. 1 : 454 S.; Bd. 2: 664 S.; Bd. 3: 320 S. - Mannhemii, apud Christian Friedrich Schwan (1733-1815).
- 1779: Beschreibung einiger Insecten, die noch im Linné’schen System fehlen und um Weilburg vorkommen.
- 1781: Von den Insecten die in Linne's Natursystem nicht befindlich sind. Bemerk. Kuhrpfälz. phys.-oek. Ges., 1779: 252–287.
- 1783: Descriptio insectorum Palatinorum. Act. Leopoldina VII.
