= Cerastis fishii =

Scientific classification
- Kingdom: Animalia
- Phylum: Arthropoda
- Class: Insecta
- Order: Lepidoptera
- Superfamily: Noctuoidea
- Family: Noctuidae
- Genus: Cerastis
- Species: C. fishii

Binomial name
- Cerastis fishii (Grote, 1878)

Synonyms
- Agrotis fishii Grote, 1878; Metalepsis fishii (Grote, 1878); Metalepsis heinrichi (Barnes & Benjamin, 1929)

Species of moth

Cerastis fishii is a moth of the family Noctuidae. It is found in eastern North America from Newfoundland to southern Ontario in Canada. In the United States, it is found from western Maine to Ohio, Michigan, and northern Wisconsin, then south to North Carolina. It has also been recorded from Tennessee.

The wingspan is 30–36 mm. Adults are on wing from March to June.

The larvae feed on the flowers and leaves of blueberry.
