= Wilhelm Grabow =

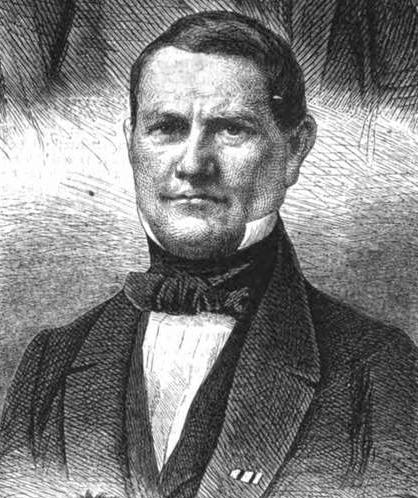
Carl Friedrich Wilhelm Grabow

Carl Friedrich Wilhelm Grabow (15 April 1802 – 15 April 1874) was a Prussian civil servant, judge, and politician.

== Biography ==
In 1848, he was the main author of the election law for the Prussian National Assembly, of which he was the president from 27 June to 26 October. He resigned the presidency, and his mandate, voluntarily. In the parliament, he belonged to the constitutional right, and played a significant role. Grabow was the only representative who took part in the congress of constitutional associations on 22 July 1848.

The Potsdam election district No. 8 elected him in 1849 to the Prussian House of Representatives and he became its president in the first legislative period from February to April. He joined the right centre. Due to his oppositional stance over the imposition of the constitution of 5 December 1848, and especially the question of the three class franchise, his election to lord mayor of Magdeburg in 1850 was not confirmed. After long hesitation, his election to mayor of Prenzlau was permitted, but limited to 12 years, rather than for life.

Out of protest against the abolition of universal suffrage, against the new electoral law and the re-establishment of the local and provincial assemblies, Grabow withdrew from political life for a while. He only rejoined the House of Representatives from 1858, serving as its vice-president in 1860-1861 and, from January 1862 to February 1866, as its president again. He led a right-liberal faction, named after him.

In 1866, he declined to be re-elected president, in order to allow a reconciliation with the government. In the previous years, he had repeatedly protested against the weak budgetary powers of the second house, which had put him at odds with Otto von Bismarck's ministers.
