= Hans Felix Husadel =

German composer and conductor

Hans Felix Husadel (18 May 1897 – 25 July 1964) was a German composer and conductor, particularly noted for modernizing the military band and for his march compositions.

== Early life ==
Husadel, born in Prenzlau, Uckermark, took Piano lessons from an early age. He also showed an affinity for painting, but music won out as a career choice. He served as a military musician in World War I (possibly running away from home to voluntarily serve). After the war he attended the Staatlichen Hochschule für Musik in Berlin. He studied piano and composition with Franz Schreker und Leo Schrattenholz.

On 1 January 1923 he entered the German Army as a military musician in the 5th Preussische Infantry Regiment in Prenzlau. He was transferred between 1925 and 1928 back to Berlin to complete his musical training. He took over the Military band of the training battalion of Infantry Regiment No. 14 in Donaueschingen. His Sunday concerts included radio broadcasts and Husadel became conductor of the local orchestra too.

At this time he became interested in modernizing military bands and creating new compositions for these organizations. His zeal in reorganizing and reforming the military band brought him to the attention of the newest armed service in Germany.

== Luftwaffe career ==
Husadel was transferred to the new Luftwaffe in 1935 and appointed Obermusikmeister with the request he organize the Musikkorps of this elite new service. On 1 April 1935 he was also appointed as professor at the Hochschule für Musik, where he would teach theory and composition until 1945. One of his students was composer and conductor Kurt Graunke, who he taught conducting.

Husadel proved to be a great reformer of military bands, dedicating himself to the job with what has been called incredible vigor. In 1935 he introduced the saxophone to the German military band – with the enthusiastic support of his commander Hermann Göring. Göring supposedly enjoyed having the saxophone included in his bands since his puritanical arch-rival Heinrich Himmler despised it as a “degenerate” instrument. One has only to hear the trio in "Fliegergeschwader Horst Wessel" (which later became Silberkondor) to hear Husadel's exposure of the unique register of the saxophones in his Luftwaffe band. According to an article by Gerhart Winter in the January 1940 Zeitschrift für Musik, saxophones caught on with German infantry band clarinetists who began procuring the instruments at their own expense.

Husadel chose Italian symphonic brass orchestras as models for the new Luftwaffe Musikkorps. He was particularly impressed with the reform work initiated by Alessandro Vessela (1860-1929) with the Carabinieri Band of Rome. There were other models: the bands of the Guardia di Finanza, the Polizia di Pubblica Sicurezza (now Banda Musicale della Polizia di Stato), and Italy's Air Force Band - the Banda della Reggia Aeronautica Militare (which had the honor of the composer Pietro Mascagni conducting its first concert).

Husadel introduced additional instruments: the Cor anglais (English Horn); a fuller range of Clarinet including A♭ piccolo clarinet, soprano clarinet, basset clarinet, and contrabass clarinet; Trumpet; and alto slide trombone. Tenor and baritone Tuba were modified so their bells faced forward, with the mechanics of the instruments adjusted to allow better handling while on the march. The traditional rotary valves on bass trumpets were also replaced with pump valves. The openings of the higher pitched brass instruments were narrowed to achieve greater sharpness and clarity of sound. The effect was to give Husadel's Luftwaffe bands a unique timbre with strong and varied middle voices.

Husadel's bands chose silver-plated instruments, giving them a modern look compared to the standard army and navy band instrument brass finishes. Husadel's Luftwaffe bands became models for both the Bundeswehr's music corps of the Germany and also the musical organization of the Nationalen Volksarmee of the German Democratic Republic (GDR) including the Zentralorchester der NVA (a point made at a symposium on Husadel by the Robert-Schumann-Hochschule Düsseldorf held in Bonn on 21–22 October 2004).

Husadel engaged composers to write music for the new air force bands including Erwin Dressel "Scherzo", Harald Genzmer "Fliegermusik in 3 Sätzen", Hermann Grabner "I bin Soldat, valera" Var. op. 54, Paul Hoffer "Fliegermorgen", Otto Meyer "Über den Wolken", "Ouvertüre über "h-f-h-a-d" - dedicated to Husadel, Bruno Stürmer? "Freier Flug", "Ernste Musik", and Eberhard L. Wittmer "Sinfonische Musik".

Husadel was appointed to the highest position in the Musikkorps as Luftwaffenmusikinspizient (Chief of Music for the Air Force) on 13 August 1936 and his continuing reorganization of bands along with lectures and demonstrations and radio broadcasts led to his being honored with the title Oberinspizienten der Luftwaffe in 1941.

Husadel introduced the 6/8 march to the Luftwaffe and composed several marches for his service to provide a new tradition, naming several of his marches after famous German aviators from the First World War such as the march that is his most famous composition “Jagdgeschwader Richthofen”. This 1935 march became No FM III, 39 of the Official "Märsche der Luftwaffe" that Husadel compiled. He also composed a well-received fanfare march in 1936: “Fliegerfanfare” with great emphasis on the high brass. It is a minute longer than most of his marches, which typically time out at two minutes. Another fanfare march, “Siegesfanfare”, was composed in 1940 in the euphoria of victory but was renamed "Europafanfare" after the war.

Other marches he composed for the Luftwaffe included “Kampfgeschwader Immelmann” (1938), "Kampfgeschwader Hindenburg" (1938?), and “Fliegergeschwader Horst Wessel” (1939), de-nazified as well as made more commercially suitable by being renamed “Silberkondor” after the war). In the first iteration of the final section of this march Husadel released a full saxophone sound that must have surprised audiences of his time. The "Peronne-Marsch" was another war-time march which may have been a reminiscence of Husadel's own career in World War I, Péronne, Somme being the scene of major battles. The march includes a typically jaunty introduction followed by a powerful conclusion. "Schwert am Himmel" (Sword in the Sky, 1940) may represent Husadel's most modern sounding Luftwaffe march.

Husadel's marches were un-Germanic sounding – unconventional, jaunty, and vibrant and more reminiscent of the compositions of Louis Ganne and John Philip Sousa. Husadel incorporated new harmonies, transparent instrumentation, and engaging melodies in his marches.

Husadel organized the music of the Luftwaffe into a publication (mentioned above) titled "Märsche der Luftwaffe", Verlag Arthur Parrhysius, Berlin - "Marches of the Air Force" to correspond with the longstanding Armeemarschsammlung and Heeresmarsch collections. His collection consisted of:

I. Präsentiermärsche (6); II Slow marches (6); III. Geschwindmärsche (46); IV Great tattoo - Großer Zapfenstreiche, V. a) funeral music, b) funeral marches; VI. Appendix.

For the marching songs important to German military units, Husadel and Carl Clewing cooperated on a "Liederbuch der Luftwaffe".

== Husadel Pre-War Concerts ==
On 13 August 1936 Husadel and his counterpart Heeresmusikinspizient Hermann Schmidt led a Großer Zapfenstreich (great tattoo) of 4,000 musicians at the 1936 Summer Olympics. In one venue, the Berlin Sportpalast in the Schöneberg section of Berlin, Husadel led concerts on 4 March and 1 December 1936 as well as a 3 March 1937 concert of 300 Luftwaffe musicians for the benefit of the Provincial Federation of the Red Cross.

== Post-war ==
After the war Husadel left his prized residence in Finkenkrug. He cultivated friendly relations with Franz Lehár and Paul Lincke while working as a theater director in Berlin and Stendal. In Berlin he also created a symphonic band which gave famous zoo concerts of sophisticated music.

In 1953, on advice from his doctor as well as encouragement from his wife, he moved to Ravensburg. He conducted the local orchestra society Städtische Orchester Weingarten, and involved himself in pops concerts, broadcasts, and major music festivals. He commissioned works of modern composers including Arnold Ebel, Boris Blacher, Herbert Brust, Eberhard Ludwig Wittmer, Werner Egk and Rudolf Wagner-Régeny. He was awarded the Bundesehrenmedaille for his work.

His final composition was likely “Der deutschen Luftwaffe gewidmet”, located after his sudden death in the papers of his estate as score and parts and likely from 1963. This was Husadel's final "Luftwaffe march". It may not have the esprit of his earlier marches for his old service but is a recognizably Husadel composition.

Husadel died from a heart attack while conducting musicians in a high level band competition at the District Music Festival in Aulendorf on 25 July 1964. He fell dead as he conducted the last chords of the overture to "Il Guarany" by Antônio Carlos Gomes.

== Husadel’s Compositions ==
Husadel created over 300 compositions and arrangements including marches, overtures, suites, and concert pieces. A partial list of his works follows:

- Aldeutsche Tanzweisen
- Alice Valse musette (1957)
- Arizona
- Bella Aurora (Spanischer Marsch, 1956)
- The Berlin Post (Marsch der Berliner U.S. Garrison, 1952; incorporating music from his own "Jagdgeschwader Mölders" and also "Columbia the Gem of the Ocean")
- Bundermarsch Präsentiermarsch (1953)
- Burlesk (alto saxophone solo)
- La Cathédrale Engloutie of Claude Debussy (transcription)
- Concordia-Marsch (1953)
- Consolation
- Cordial Marsch
- Der deutschen Luftwaffe gewidmet (a 1963 march, likely Husadel's final composition, manuscript located in his estate)
- Deutsche Feierabend
- Elegische Serenade für Blasmusik
- Es steht ein kleines Edelweiss (based on folk melody, 1942)
- Europafanfare (formerly Siegesfanfare)
- Evelyn Walzer (1956)
- Fallschirmjager Marsch (1933)
- Favoriten Marsch
- Fest in Suden
- Feuervogel Foxtr. (1957)
- Flieger-Fanfare Marsch (1936)
- Fliegerhelden (composed for the Bundesluftwaffe)
- Fliegergeschwader Horst Wessel Marsch (1939)
- Frohliche Heimkehr
- Frohsinn im Gleichschritt Marschpotp. (1955)
- Gesang der Gondelführer (Barcarola, 1956)
- Herodias Overture
- Hinaus in die Ferne! Wanderliederpotpourri (1956)
- Ich bin ein Freier Wildpretschutz
- Indische Ballet Suite
- Jagdgeschwader Mölders Marsch (1944)
- Jagdgeschwader Richthofen (1935)
- Junge Truppe Marsch (1943)
- Jupiter-Marsch (1955)
- Kampfgeschwader Hindenburg Marsch (1938?)
- Kampfgeschwader Immelmann (1938)
- Das Kleine Platzkonzert (suite)
- Larifari Intermezzo (1955)
- Legende
- Lyrisches Capriccio
- Magasan repulsion a Daru (Hungarian march, 1952)
- Marsch der Vereinten Nationen (1953)
- Mein Schlesierland Liedermarsch (based on folk melody, 1951)
- Menuett (1955)
- Militärsignal (Marsch)
- Minister-Fanfare (Präsentiermarsch)
- Der Nock Overture (umlaut over the o of nock)
- Olé Torero! (Spanischer marsch, 1953)
- Olympia-Marsch (1953)
- Partita musical
- Le Petit Tambour Franz Marsch (1954)
- Morgengruß Marsch (1955)
- Péronne-Marsch
- Pico Bello lustige Polka (1959)
- Polizei Marsch (1952)
- Polowetzer Tänze of Alexander Borodin (arr.)
- Postawy-Marsch
- Rauber Marsch (Räubermarsch es wollt ein Mädchen früh aufsteh’n, 52)
- Rokoko-Serenade (1955)
- Rüpeltanz (1956)
- Schlag auf Schlag Marsch (1951)
- Schotische Rahpsodie
- Schwert am Himmel
- Sentimental Serenade
- Siegesfanfare (1940)
- Silberkondor Marsch (a renaming of Fliegergeschwader Horst Wessel)
- Sissi (Fox-Intermetzzo; für Akkordeon, 1957)
- Tanzimpressionen (1955)
- Tarragona Pasodoble (1955)
- Toccata und Fuge d-Moll BWV 565 by J.S. Bach (arr. 1943)
- Tod und Verklärung of Richard Strauss (transcription, may be lost)
- 12 Sohne, legende
- Valse rouge (1954)
- Valse rubato (1957)
- Volksweisen aus dem Schwarzwald
- Westerwald Marsch (based on folk melody, 1951)
- Westfalen-Marsch Liedermarsch (based on folk melody, 1952)
- Wo die Alpentosen blüh’n (Lieder d. Berge; Potpourri 1956)
- Zu Neuen Siegen

== Discography ==
Outside of the CD that accompanies Hans Felix Husadel: Werk, Wirken, Wirkung; Dokumentation zum Symposium, there is no full program of Husadel music available. The CD from the Großkonzert given as part of the symposium included members of Luftwaffenmusikorps 1 and 2 as well as the Musikkorps der Bundeswehr all conducted by Michael Schramm. The CD includes four marches: “Fliegerfanfare”; “Silberkondor”; “Der deutschen Luftwaffe gewidmet”; and “Peronne-Marsch”. There are also two transcriptions by Husadel: “Die versunkene Kathedrale” and “Toccata und Fuge in d-moll”.
