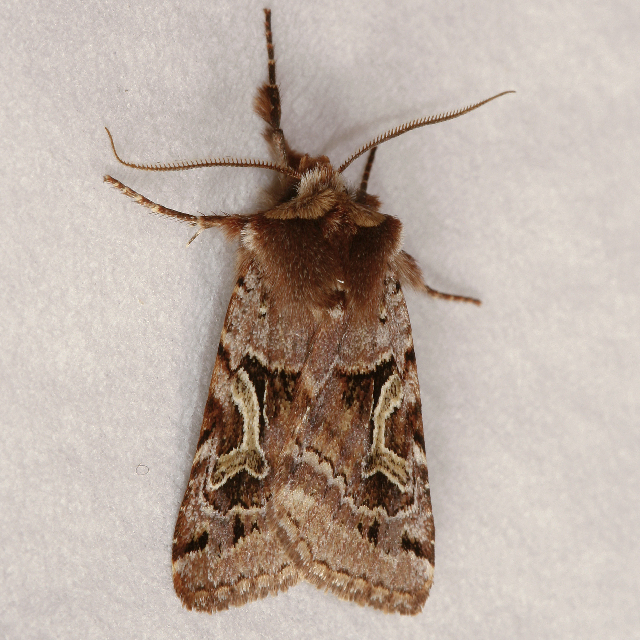

Scientific classification
- Domain: Eukaryota
- Kingdom: Animalia
- Phylum: Arthropoda
- Class: Insecta
- Order: Lepidoptera
- Superfamily: Noctuoidea
- Family: Noctuidae
- Tribe: Noctuini
- Subtribe: Noctuina
- Genus: Cerastis
- Species: C. enigmatica

Binomial name
- Cerastis enigmatica Lafontaine & L. G. Crabo, 1997

= Cerastis enigmatica =

Species of moth

Cerastis enigmatica, the enigmatic dart, is a species of cutworm or dart moth in the family Noctuidae. It is found in North America.

The MONA or Hodges number for Cerastis enigmatica is 10995.2.
