= Cerastis salicarum =

Scientific classification
- Kingdom: Animalia
- Phylum: Arthropoda
- Class: Insecta
- Order: Lepidoptera
- Superfamily: Noctuoidea
- Family: Noctuidae
- Tribe: Noctuini
- Subtribe: Noctuina
- Genus: Cerastis
- Species: C. salicarum

Binomial name
- Cerastis salicarum (Walker, 1857)

Species of moth

Cerastis salicarum, the willow dart, is a species of cutworm or dart moth from the family Noctuidae.

The MONA or Hodges number for Cerastis salicarum is 10996.
