= René Bielke =

German ice hockey player

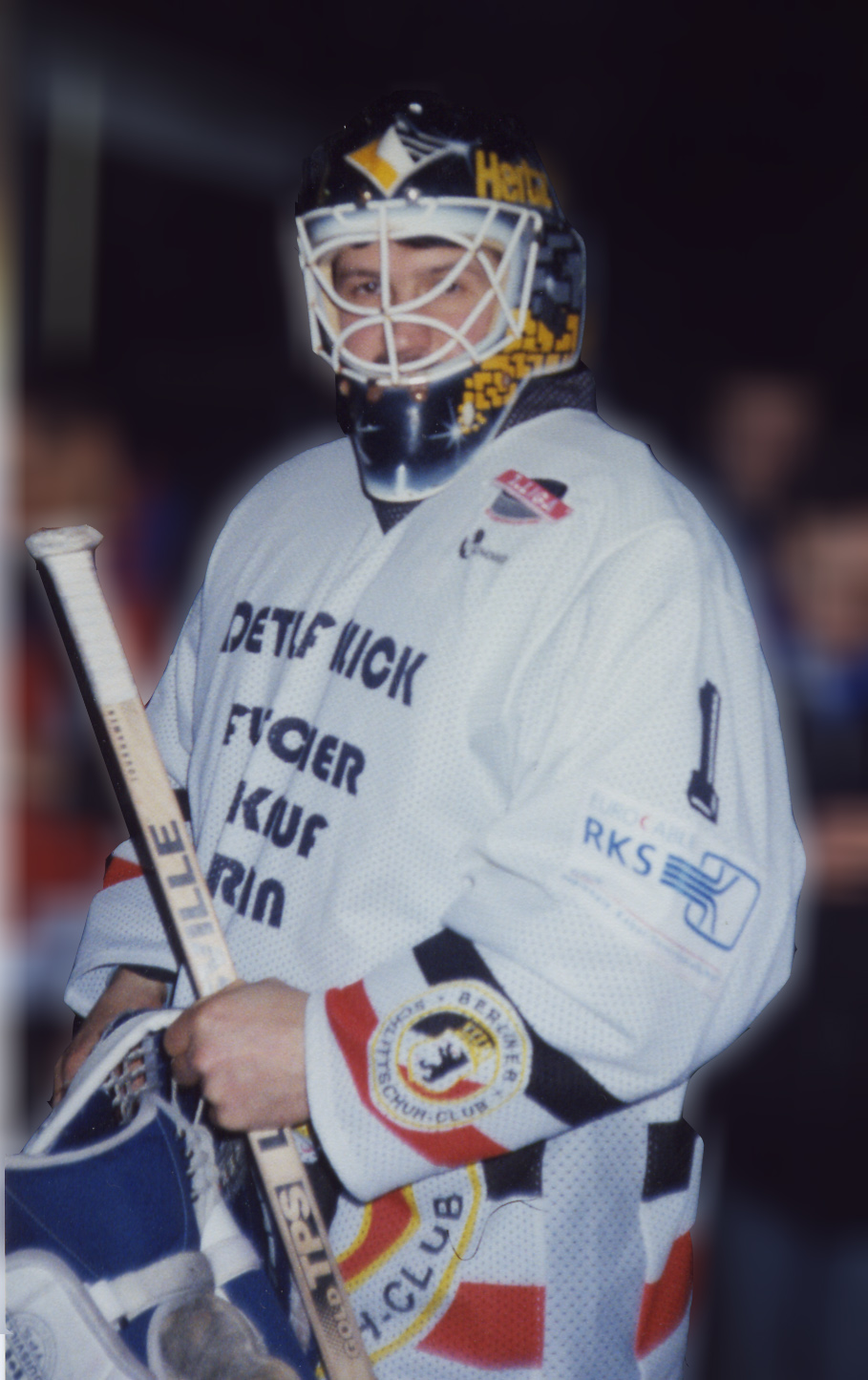
- René Bielke
- Born: 9 April 1962 (age 63) Prenzlau, Bezirk Neubrandenburg, East Germany
- Height: 6 ft 2 in (188 cm)
- Weight: 201 lb (91 kg; 14 st 5 lb)
- Position: Goalie
- Caught: Left
- Played for: EHC Dynamo Berlin; EC Ratingen; Krefeld Pinguine
- National team: East Germany and Germany
- Playing career: 1980–1997

René Bielke (born 9 April 1962) is a German former ice hockey goaltender.

Bielke played for EHC Dynamo Berlin (now Eisbären Berlin) from 1980 to 1992. His goals against average of 1.17 in 1982 is still unbeaten in Eisbären history. He later played for EC Ratingen and the Krefeld Pinguine. After retiring in 1997 he made a one-game return for Eisbären Juniors Berlin in the Oberliga during the 2004-05 season.

Internationally, Bielke gained 31 international caps for East Germany and 2 for the reunified Germany.

His son Dominik Bielke also played professional ice hockey for Eisbären Berlin before retiring in 2013 due to a hip injury.
