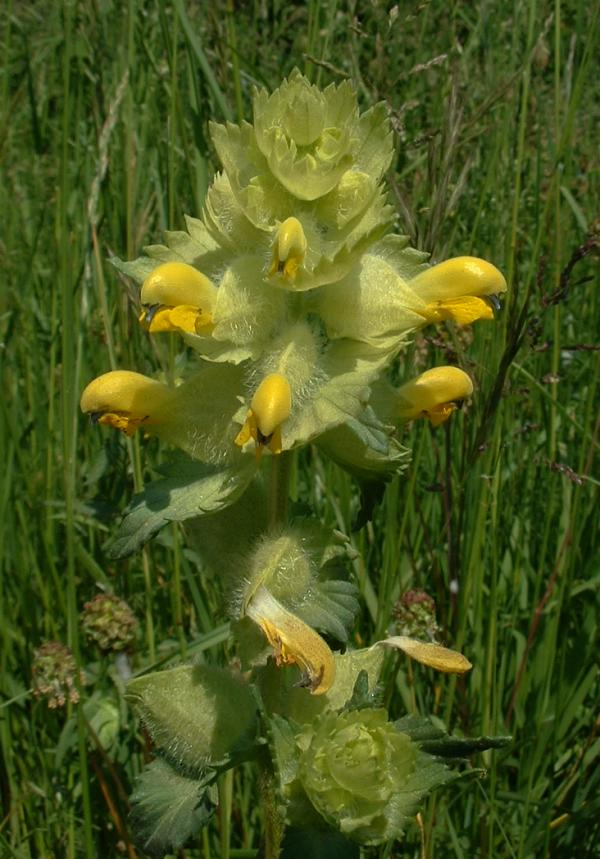

Scientific classification
- Kingdom: Plantae
- Clade: Embryophytes
- Clade: Tracheophytes
- Clade: Spermatophytes
- Clade: Angiosperms
- Clade: Eudicots
- Clade: Asterids
- Order: Lamiales
- Family: Orobanchaceae
- Genus: Rhinanthus
- Species: R. alectorolophus

Binomial name
- Rhinanthus alectorolophus (Scop.) Pollich

Synonyms
- List: * Alectorolophus arvensis Semler; * Alectorolophus ellipticus (Hausskn.) Sterneck; * Alectorolophus facchinii (Chabert) Sterneck; * Alectorolophus grandiflorus var. wallrothii Rouy; * Alectorolophus hirsutus (Lam.) All.; * Alectorolophus kerneri Sterneck; * Alectorolophus patulus Sterneck; * Alectorolophus semleri Sterneck; * Rhinanthus alectorolophus var. wallrothii (Rouy) Lambinon; * Rhinanthus buccalis Wallr.; * Rhinanthus ellipticus Hausskn.; * Rhinanthus facchinii Chabert; * Rhinanthus hirsutus Lam.; * Rhinanthus patulus (Sterneck) Schinz & Thell.; * Rhinanthus semleri (Sterneck) Schinz & Thell.; * Mimulus alectorolophus Scop

= Rhinanthus alectorolophus =

Species of flowering plant in the broomrape family

Rhinanthus alectorolophus, the European yellow-rattle, is a plant species of the genus Rhinanthus, native to Europe.
