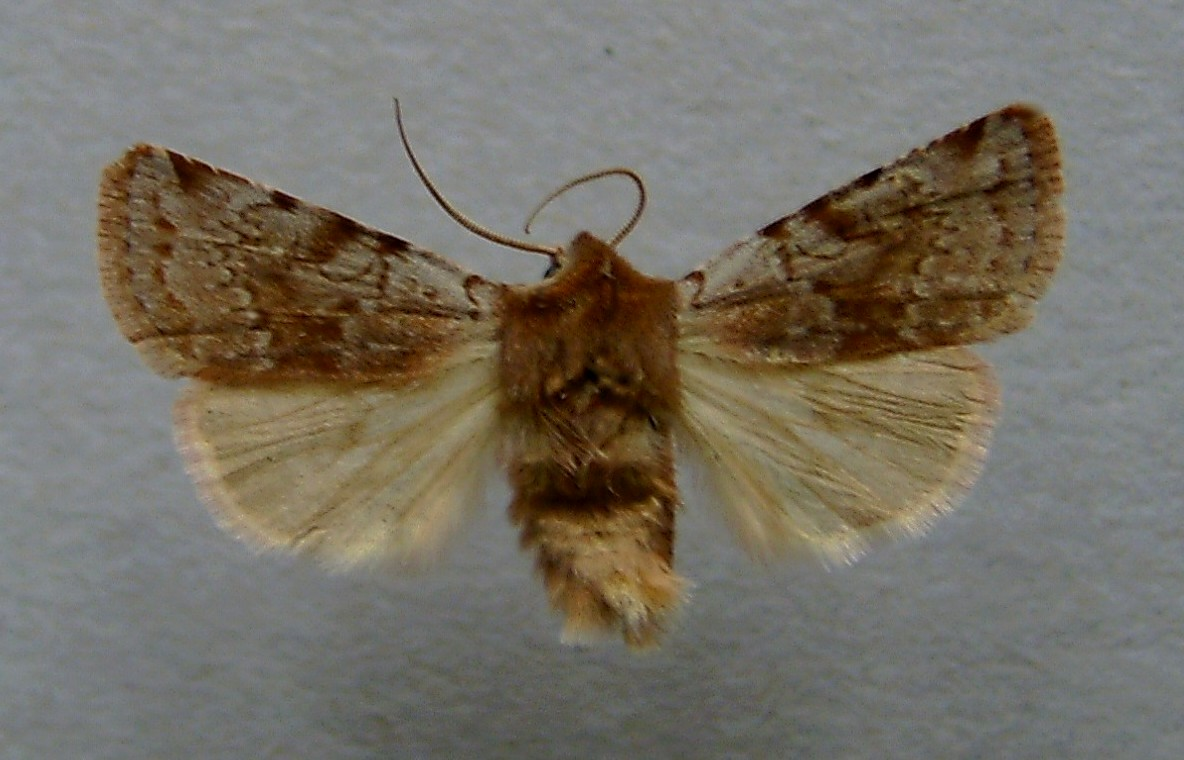
- Cerastis rubricosa

Scientific classification
- Kingdom: Animalia
- Phylum: Arthropoda
- Clade: Pancrustacea
- Class: Insecta
- Order: Lepidoptera
- Superfamily: Noctuoidea
- Family: Noctuidae
- Subtribe: Noctuina
- Genus: Cerastis; Ochsenheimer, 1816

Synonyms
- Metalepsis Grote, 1875; Facastis Beck, 1991

= Cerastis =

Genus of moths

Cerastis is a genus of moths of the family Noctuidae.

== Species ==
There are 15 accepted species based on the Global Lepidoptera Index:

- Cerastis cornuta Grote, 1874
- Cerastis enigmatica Lafontaine & Crabo, 1997
- Cerastis faceta Treitschke, 1835
- Cerastis fishii Grote, 1878
- Cerastis gloriosa Crabo & Lafontaine, 1997
- Cerastis griseiorbis Hreblay & Ronkay, 1997
- Cerastis leucographa ([Denis & Schiffermüller], 1775)
- Cerastis orientalia Boursin, 1948
- Cerastis pallescens Butler, 1878
- Cerastis robertsoni Lafontaine & Crabo, 1997
- Cerastis rubricosa [Denis & Schiffermüller], 1775
- Cerastis rufomedialis Marumo, 1920
- Cerastis salicarum Walker, 1857
- Cerastis tenebrifera Walker, 1865
- Cerastis violetta Boursin, 1948

Markku Savela's database lists 16 species in two subgenera:

Subgenus Cerastis

- Cerastis aspira Gyulai, Ronkay & Saldaitis, 2011
- Cerastis faceta (Treitschke, 1835)
- Cerastis flagellata Gyulai, Ronkay & Saldaitis, 2011
- Cerastis griseiorbis Hreblay & Ronkay, 1997
- Cerastis leucographa (Denis & Schiffermüller, 1775)
- Cerastis orientalis Boursin, 1948
- Cerastis pallescens (Butler, 1878)
- Cerastis rubricosa (Denis & Schiffermüller, 1775)
- Cerastis tenebrifera (Walker, 1865)
- Cerastis violetta Boursin, 1955

Subgenus Metalepsis Grote, 1875

- Cerastis cornuta (Grote, 1874)
- Cerastis enigmatica Crabo & Lafontaine, 1997
- Cerastis fishii (Grote, 1878)
- Cerastis gloriosa Crabo & Lafontaine, 1997
- Cerastis robertsoni Crabo & Lafontaine, 1997
- Cerastis salicarum (Walker, 1857)

Apart from the subgenus structure, these lists differ in that Savela recognizes Cerastis aspira and Cerastis flagellata missing from the Global Lepidoptera Index, whereas the opposite is true for Cerastis rufomedialis.
