= Christian Friedrich Schwan =

German publisher and bookseller (1733–1815)

Christian Friedrich Schwan (12 December 1733 in Prenzlau – 29 June 1815 in Heidelberg) was a German publisher and bookseller.

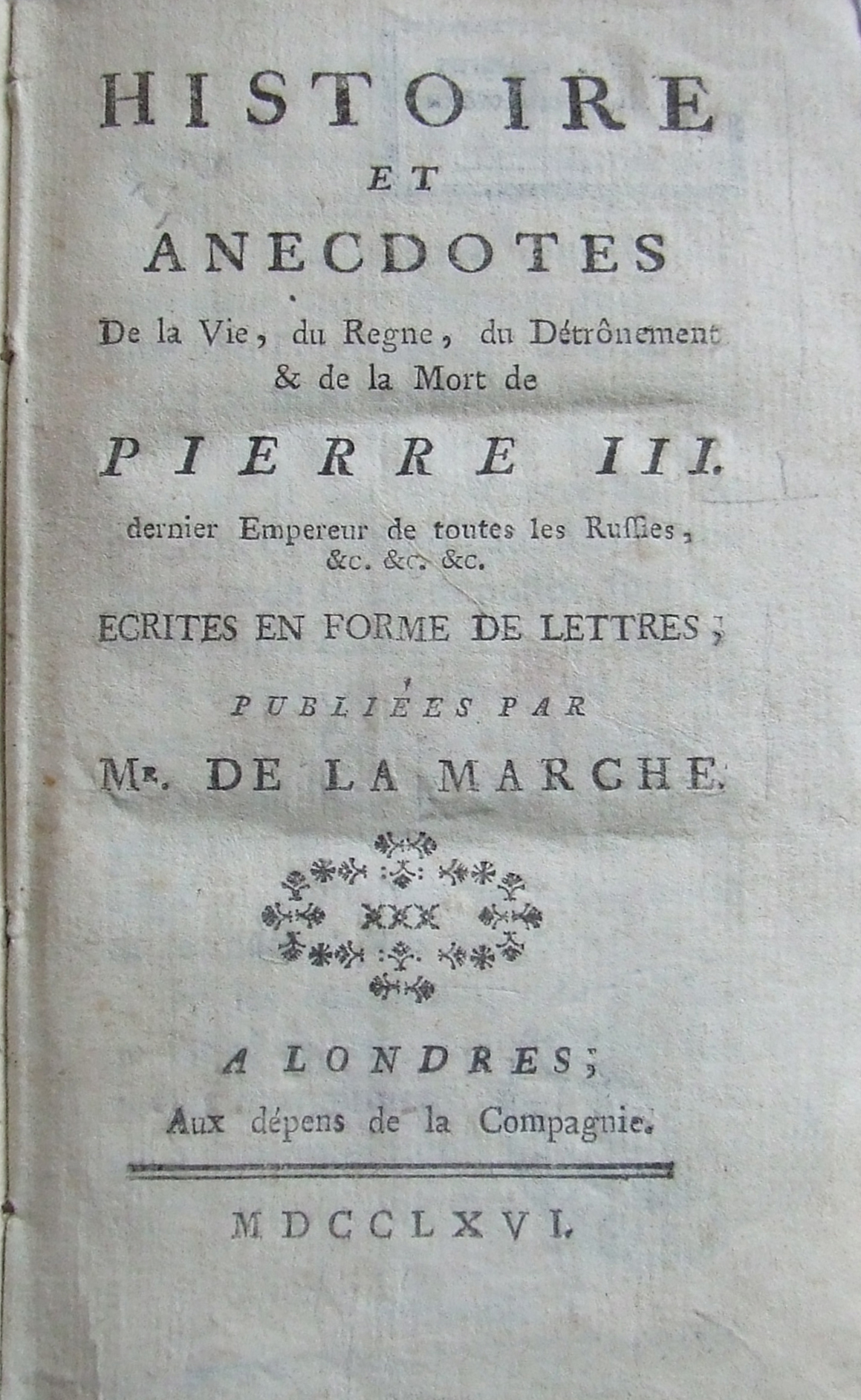
Ch.-Fr. Schwan. A history of Peter III. The last edition of 1766

After studies of theology in Halle and Jena, he worked as a proofreader at the academy in St. Petersburg. In 1762 he was a legal assistant in the regiment of Prince Georg von Holstein-Gottorp, later working in the Netherlands, where he published Anecdotes russes ou lettres d'un officier anglais. In 1764 he started a weekly literary journal in Frankfurt am Main.

In 1765 he became manager of a bookstore in Mannheim that was owned by his father-in-law. In Mannheim he established its "state theatre", and in doing so, played an active role in theatrical affairs. Schwan's bookstore and home were centers of literary life in Mannheim, where authors Lessing, Wieland, Herder, Goethe, Lenz, Schubart and Schiller were among the occasional visitors. In April 1785, Schiller made a proposal of marriage for Schwan's eldest daughter, Margarethe.

To avoid the distractions of war, he left Mannheim in 1794, taking up residency in Heilbronn, then in Stuttgart, and finally in Heidelberg.

Among his literary works was the publication of numerous French-German dictionaries. Other works attributed to Schwan include:

- Russische Anekdoten von der Regierung und Tod Peters des Dritten, 1764
- Histoire et anecdotes de la vie, du règne, du détrônement & de la mort de Pierre III ... Ecrites en forme de lettres, publiées par Mr. de la Marche, 1766
- Abbildungen der vorzüglichsten geistlichenorden in ihren gewöhnlichsten ordenskleidungen, 1791.
  - Works about Christian Friedrich Schwan:
- Christian Friedrich Schwan, Kurfürstlicher Hofbuchhändler zu Mannheim : 1733-1815 by Rudi Dorsch, 1991.
