= Großer See =

Lake in Uckermark District, Brandenburg, Germany

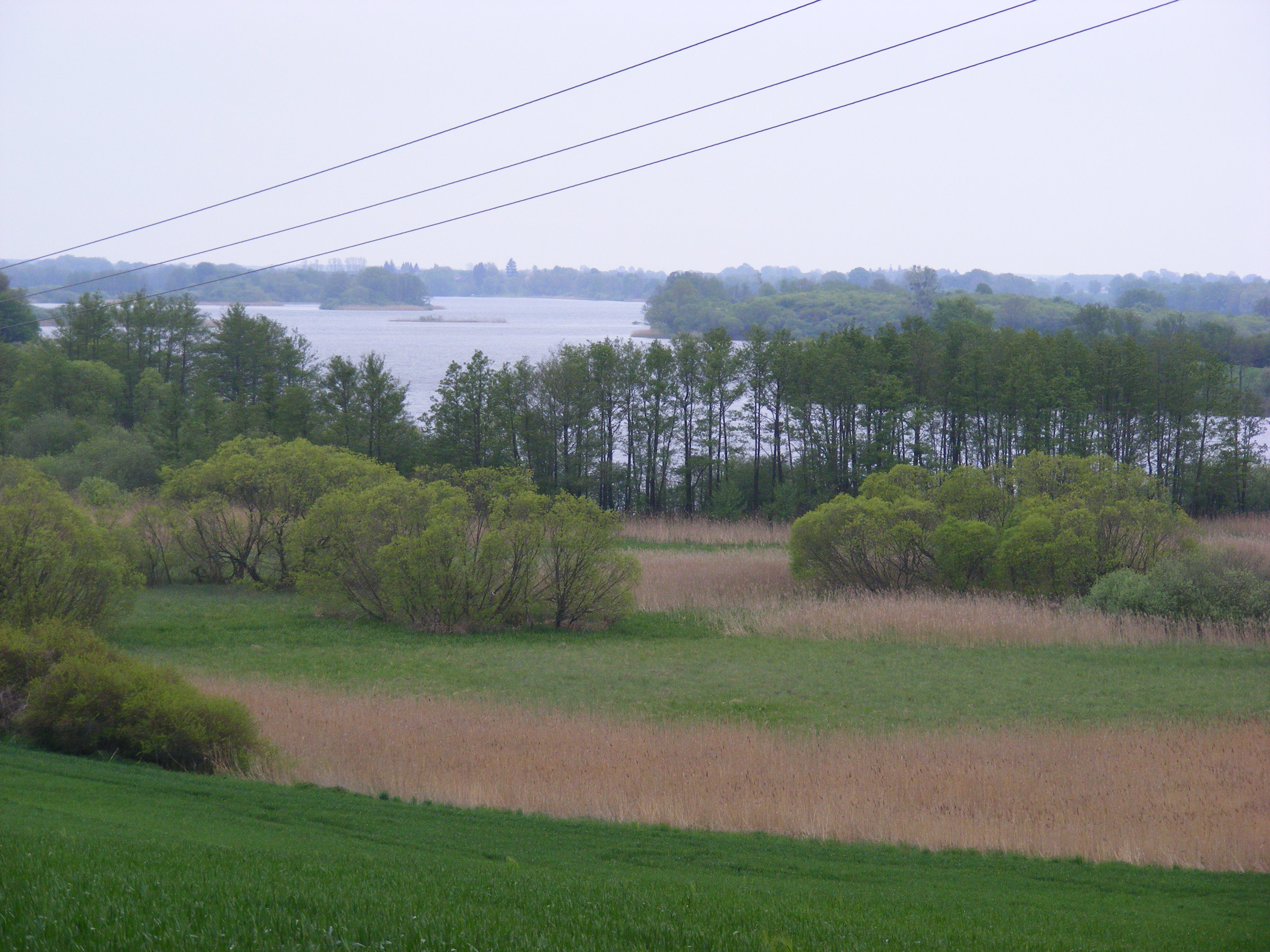
- Großer See - near Fürstenwerder (western Uckermark) from the north (L 25 at the state border)

- Location within Brandenburg
- Location: Landkreis Uckermark, Brandenburg
- Coordinates: 53°23′24″N 13°33′45″E
- Basin countries: Germany
- Surface area: 2.6 km^{2} (1.0 sq mi)
- Surface elevation: 93 m (305 ft)

Großer See is a lake in Landkreis Uckermark, Brandenburg, Germany. At an elevation of 93 m, its surface area is 2.6 km^{2}. It is situated in Fürstenwerder, part of the municipality of Nordwestuckermark.
