= Luca Piwodda =

German local politician and mayor

Mayor of Gartz
- Incumbent
- Assumed office 9 June 2024
- Preceded by: Inge Reppenhagen

Personal details
- Born: 4 September 1999 (age 27) Schwedt/Oder, Germany
- Party: Party of Progress (since 2024)
- Other political affiliations: Free Parliamentary Alliance (2018–2024)
- Education: University of Greifswald
- Website: www.luca-piwodda.de

Luca Piwodda (born 4 September 1999) is a German politician who has served as the mayor of Gartz since 9 June 2024. He is the third youngest mayor in Germany, being elected at the age of 25.

== Early life ==
Piwodda was born on 4 September 1999 in Schwedt/Oder and grew up in Gartz. He completed his Abitur at the Carl-Friedrich-Gauß-Gymnasium in 2017. Piwodda attended the University of Greifswald, where he studied politics, history, and philosophy.

== Political career ==
Piwodda's political career began at the age of 15, when his family took him to a local Social Democratic Party (SPD) gathering. Later being able to secure an internship at the Bundestag, Piwodda grew disillusioned with the SPD by the 2017 federal election and founded his own political party, the Free Parliamentary Alliance (FPA) in summer of 2018, a self-proclaimed centre-left party for the youth.

During the 2024 Brandenburg local elections, Piwodda ran as an independent for four positions simultaneously: a seat on the Uckermark district council as well as mayor, Ortsbeirat, and city council of Gartz; all of which he won. As the mayor of Gartz, Piwodda succeeded Inge Reppenhagen of the FPA who ran in place of Piwodda during the 2019 mayoral election against Piwodda's SPD grandfather. In his 2024 mayoral bid, he won 74.35% of the vote (919 votes), defeating the only other candidate, Evelin Wenzel of The Left, in the first round.

Piwodda's party, the FPA, merged with the Party of Progress (PdF) in 2024. Piwodda has since served on the PdF's presidium.

== Personal life ==
Piwodda is a midfielder at the local SV Blau-Weiß 90 Gartz football club. His grandfather, Burkhard Fleischmann of the SPD, was the mayor of Gartz for 11 years.
