= Schönfeld, Brandenburg =

Schönfeld
- Municipality
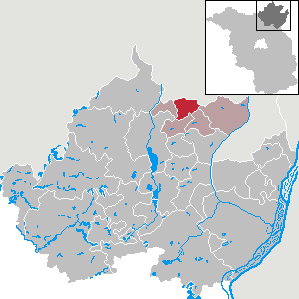
- Location of Schönfeld within Uckermark district
- Interactive map of Schönfeld
- Location within Germany Location within Brandenburg
- Coordinates: 53°25′00″N 13°59′12″E
- Country: Germany
- State: Brandenburg
- District: Uckermark
- Municipal assoc.: Brüssow (Uckermark)

Government
  - Mayor (2024–29): Hardy Müller

Area
  - Total: 29.03 km^{2} (11.21 sq mi)
- Elevation: 57 m (187 ft)

Population (2025-12-31)
  - Total: 529
  - Density: 18.2/km^{2} (47.2/sq mi)
- Time zone: UTC+01:00 (CET)
  - Summer (DST): UTC+02:00 (CEST)
- Postal codes: 17291
- Dialling codes: 039854
- Vehicle registration: UM
- Website: www.amt-bruessow.de

Schönfeld is a municipality in the Uckermark district, in Brandenburg, Germany.

== Demography ==
Development of population since 1875 within the current boundaries (Blue line: Population; Dotted line: Comparison to population development of Brandenburg state; Grey background: Time of Nazi rule; Red background: Time of communist rule)

Schönfeld [Uckermark]: Population development
within the current boundaries (2017)

Year	Pop.	±% p.a.
1875	646	—
1890	659	+0.13%
1910	856	+1.32%
1925	1,004	+1.07%
1933	921	−1.07%
1939	918	−0.05%
1946	1,296	+5.05%
1950	1,414	+2.20%
1964	1,180	−1.28%
1971	1,067	−1.43%
1981	924	−1.43%
1985	893	−0.85%
1989	862	−0.88%
1990	851	−1.28%

Year	Pop.	±% p.a.
1991	855	+0.47%
1992	847	−0.94%
1993	846	−0.12%
1994	843	−0.35%
1995	845	+0.24%
1996	820	−2.96%
1997	810	−1.22%
1998	804	−0.74%
1999	799	−0.62%
2000	778	−2.63%
2001	784	+0.77%
2002	753	−3.95%
2003	734	−2.52%
2004	722	−1.63%

Year	Pop.	±% p.a.
2005	728	+0.83%
2006	705	−3.16%
2007	674	−4.40%
2008	670	−0.59%
2009	650	−2.99%
2010	633	−2.62%
2011	614	−3.00%
2012	612	−0.33%
2013	644	+5.23%
2014	624	−3.11%
2015	615	−1.44%
2016	597	−2.93%
2017	593	−0.67%
