= Göritz =

- Municipality
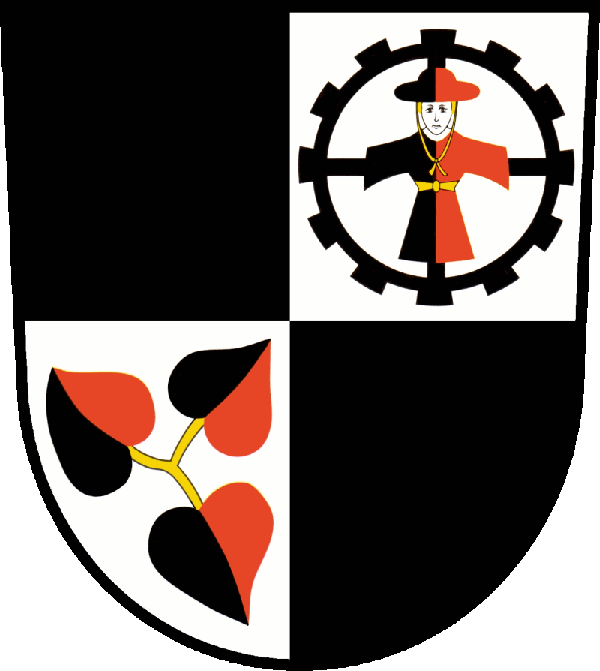
- Coat of arms

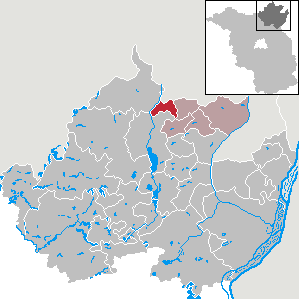
- Location of Göritz within Uckermark district
- Interactive map of Göritz
- Location within Germany Location within Brandenburg
- Coordinates: 53°25′N 13°55′E
- Country: Germany
- State: Brandenburg
- District: Uckermark
- Municipal assoc.: Brüssow (Uckermark)

Government
  - Mayor (2024–29): Daniel Manke

Area
  - Total: 25.42 km^{2} (9.81 sq mi)
- Elevation: 37 m (121 ft)

Population (2025-12-31)
  - Total: 790
  - Density: 31/km^{2} (80/sq mi)
- Time zone: UTC+01:00 (CET)
  - Summer (DST): UTC+02:00 (CEST)
- Postal codes: 17291
- Dialling codes: 039851
- Vehicle registration: UM
- Website: www.amt-bruessow.de

Göritz is a municipality in the Uckermark district, in Brandenburg, Germany.

== Demography ==
Development of Population since 1875 within the Current Boundaries (Blue Line: Population; Dotted Line: Comparison to Population Development of Brandenburg state; Grey Background: Time of Nazi rule; Red Background: Time of Communist rule)

Göritz: Population development
within the current boundaries (2017)

Year	Pop.	±% p.a.
1875	654	—
1890	565	−0.97%
1910	695	+1.04%
1925	638	−0.57%
1933	783	+2.59%
1939	695	−1.97%
1946	1,170	+7.72%
1950	1,187	+0.36%
1964	856	−2.31%
1971	837	−0.32%
1981	822	−0.18%
1985	947	+3.60%
1989	951	+0.11%
1990	943	−0.84%

Year	Pop.	±% p.a.
1991	947	+0.42%
1992	934	−1.37%
1993	925	−0.96%
1994	923	−0.22%
1995	932	+0.98%
1996	932	+0.00%
1997	944	+1.29%
1998	954	+1.06%
1999	944	−1.05%
2000	928	−1.69%
2001	927	−0.11%
2002	903	−2.59%
2003	882	−2.33%
2004	856	−2.95%

Year	Pop.	±% p.a.
2005	836	−2.34%
2006	836	+0.00%
2007	844	+0.96%
2008	831	−1.54%
2009	822	−1.08%
2010	804	−2.19%
2011	796	−1.00%
2012	781	−1.88%
2013	796	+1.92%
2014	794	−0.25%
2015	780	−1.76%
2016	793	+1.67%
2017	805	+1.51%
