= Flieth-Stegelitz =

- Municipality
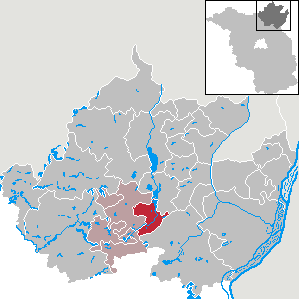
- Location of Flieth-Stegelitz within Uckermark district
- Interactive map of Flieth-Stegelitz
- Location within Germany Location within Brandenburg
- Coordinates: 53°10′00″N 13°49′00″E
- Country: Germany
- State: Brandenburg
- District: Uckermark
- Municipal assoc.: Gerswalde

Government
  - Mayor (2024–29): Matthias Böge

Area
  - Total: 46.60 km^{2} (17.99 sq mi)
- Elevation: 41 m (135 ft)

Population (2025-12-31)
  - Total: 500
  - Density: 11/km^{2} (28/sq mi)
- Time zone: UTC+01:00 (CET)
  - Summer (DST): UTC+02:00 (CEST)
- Postal codes: 17268
- Dialling codes: 039887
- Vehicle registration: UM
- Website: www.amt-gerswalde.de

Flieth-Stegelitz is a municipality in the Uckermark district, in Brandenburg, Germany. It is part of the Amt ("collective municipality") Gerswalde. The municipality arose on 31 December 2001 by merging the former autonomous municipalities of Flieth and Stegelitz.

== Geography ==
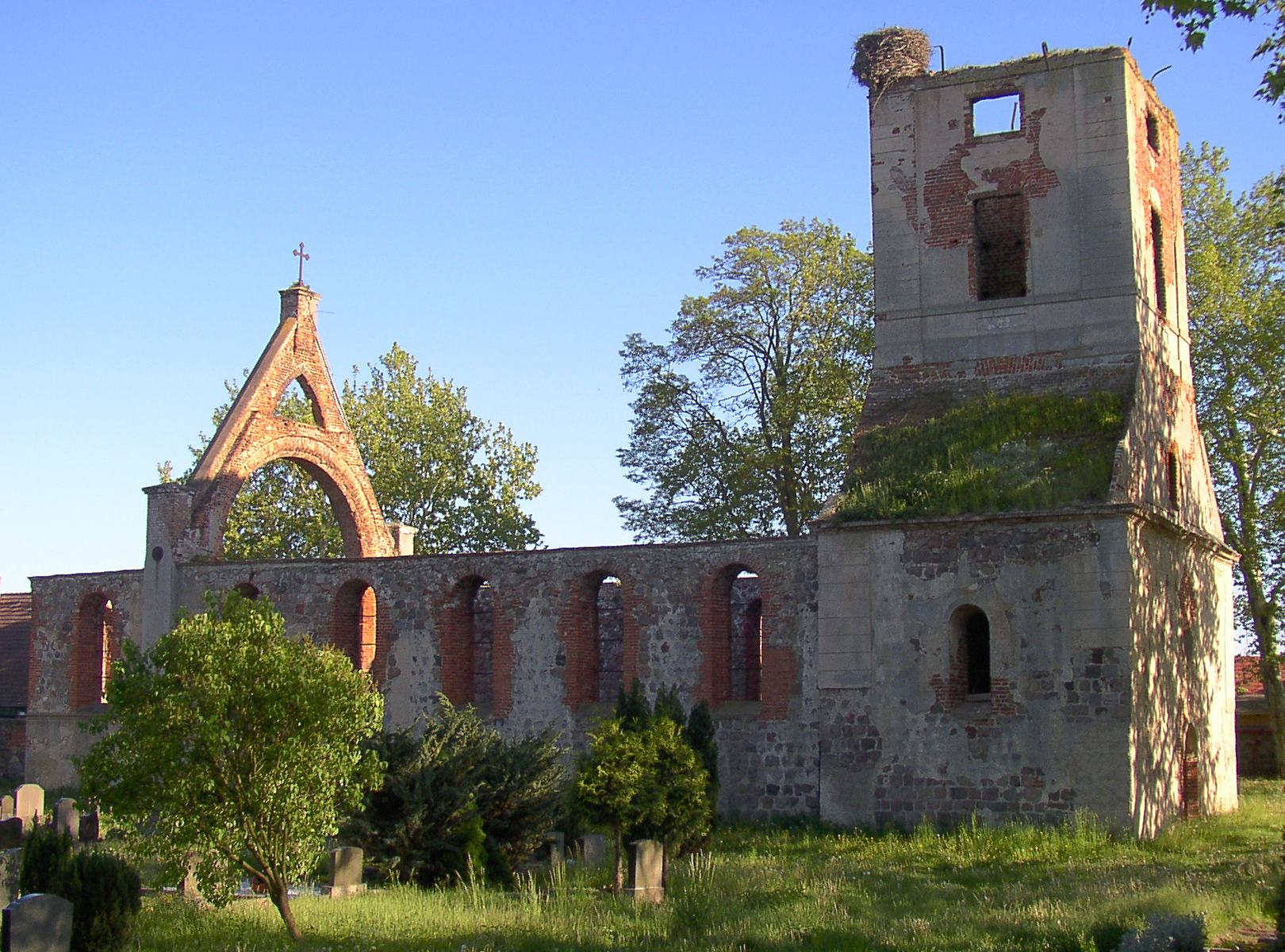
Church ruin in Flieth

The municipal area is located in the rural Uckermark region of northeastern Brandenburg, within the Schorfheide-Chorin Biosphere Reserve. In the north it borders on the shore of Lake Oberuckersee, fed and drained by the Uecker River. The municipality contains six localities (Ortsteile):

- Flieth
- Hessenhagen
- Pfingstberg
- Stegelitz
- Suckow
- Voßberg

== History ==
Both Flieth (Vlete) and Stegelitz in the Margraviate of Brandenburg were first mentioned in a 1269 deed, probably founded by the scions of one Stegelitz noble dynasty. While Flieth passed to the Arnim noble family in the mid 15th century, Stegelitz was sold several times, until both villages were devastated during the Thirty Years' War.

In 1734 the Arnim dynasty held Flieth and Stegelitz, they built a lavish manor house in Suckow, which was burnt to the ground in the late days of World War II.

== Demography ==
Development of Population since 1875 within the Current Boundaries (Blue Line: Population; Dotted Line: Comparison to Population Development of Brandenburg state; Grey Background: Time of Nazi rule; Red Background: Time of Communist rule)

Flieth-Stegelitz: Population development
within the current boundaries (2018)

Year	Pop.	±% p.a.
1875	1,238	—
1890	1,198	−0.22%
1910	1,337	+0.55%
1925	1,111	−1.23%
1933	948	−1.96%
1939	977	+0.50%
1946	1,592	+7.22%
1950	1,613	+0.33%
1964	1,096	−2.72%
1971	1,053	−0.57%
1981	825	−2.41%
1985	787	−1.17%
1989	826	+1.22%
1990	834	+0.97%

Year	Pop.	±% p.a.
1991	784	−6.00%
1992	776	−1.02%
1993	766	−1.29%
1994	775	+1.17%
1995	774	−0.13%
1996	750	−3.10%
1997	775	+3.33%
1998	771	−0.52%
1999	766	−0.65%
2000	767	+0.13%
2001	748	−2.48%
2002	741	−0.94%
2003	725	−2.16%
2004	715	−1.38%

Year	Pop.	±% p.a.
2005	699	−2.24%
2006	697	−0.29%
2007	685	−1.72%
2008	660	−3.65%
2009	652	−1.21%
2010	631	−3.22%
2011	578	−8.40%
2012	550	−4.84%
2013	551	+0.18%
2014	551	+0.00%
2015	546	−0.91%
2016	542	−0.73%
2017	536	−1.11%
2018	529	−1.31%
