= Gartz =

- Town
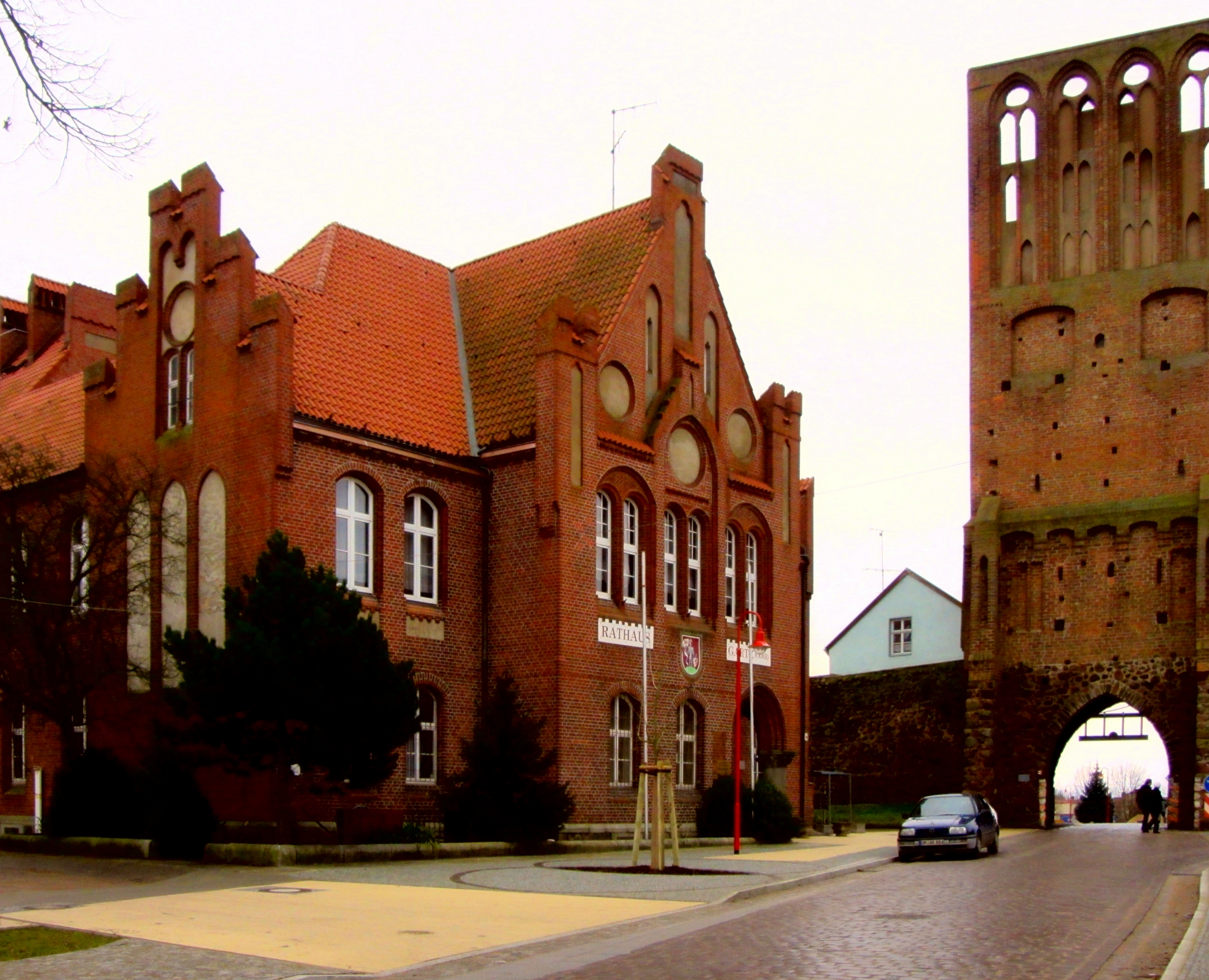
- Town hall

- Coat of arms

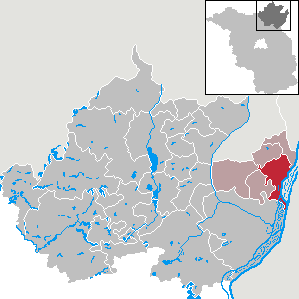
- Location of Gartz within Uckermark district
- Interactive map of Gartz
- Location within Germany Location within Brandenburg
- Coordinates: 53°12′N 14°23′E
- Country: Germany
- State: Brandenburg
- District: Uckermark
- Municipal assoc.: Gartz (Oder)

Government
  - Mayor (2024–29): Luca Piwodda (PdF)

Area
  - Total: 61.89 km^{2} (23.90 sq mi)
- Elevation: 6 m (20 ft)

Population (2025-12-31)
  - Total: 2,295
  - Density: 37.08/km^{2} (96.04/sq mi)
- Time zone: UTC+01:00 (CET)
  - Summer (DST): UTC+02:00 (CEST)
- Postal codes: 16307
- Dialling codes: 03332
- Vehicle registration: UM
- Website: www.gartz.de

Gartz (German pronunciation: [ɡaʁts]) is a border town in the Uckermark district in Brandenburg, in north-eastern Germany. It is located on the West bank of the Oder River, on the border with Poland, about 20 kilometres (12 mi) south of Szczecin, Poland. It is located within the historic region of Western Pomerania.

== History ==
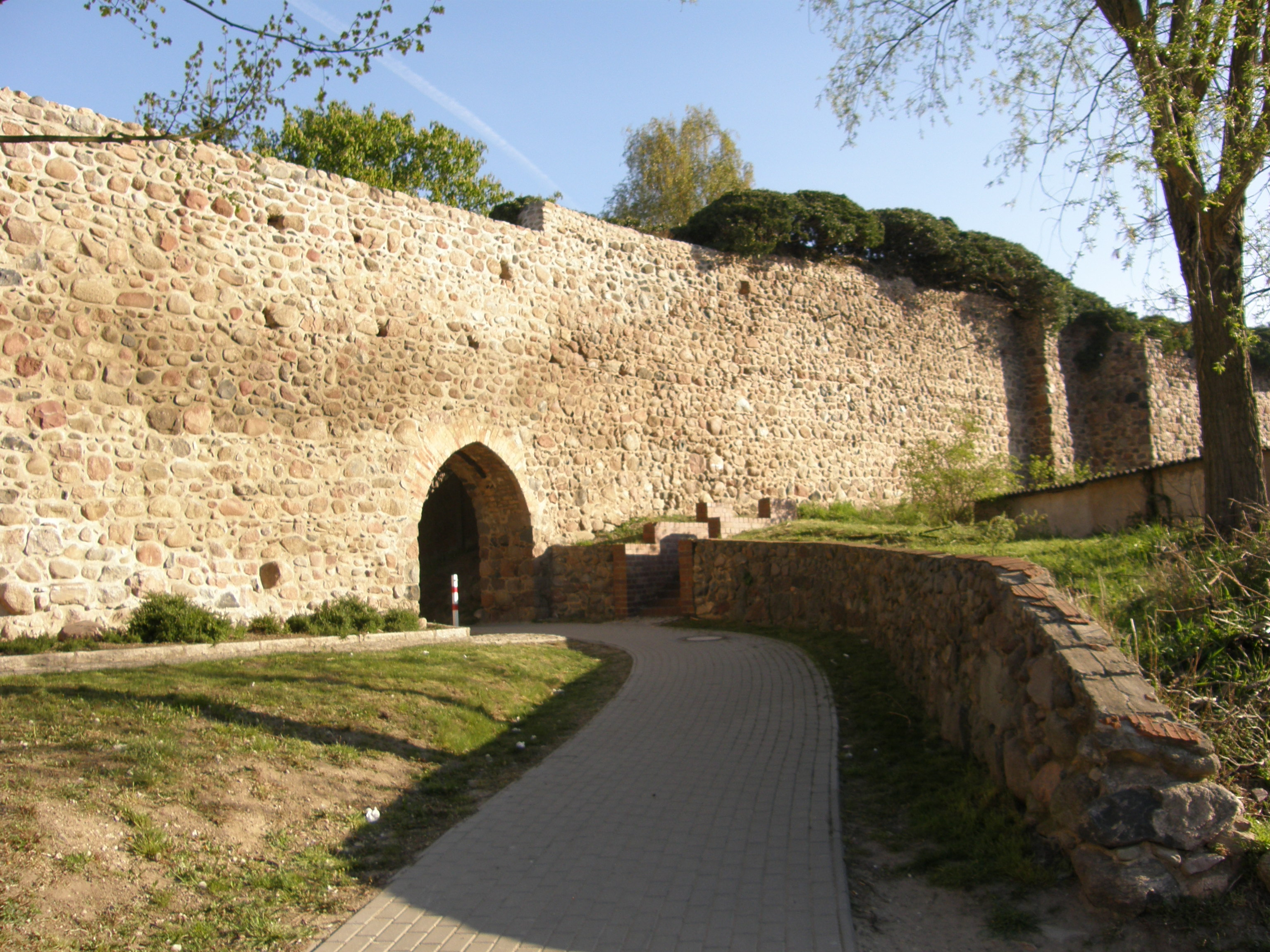
Preserved medieval town walls

The existence of the town was first documented in 1124, when it was part of the Duchy of Pomerania, which had been conquered by the Polish duke Bolesław III Wrymouth. It was then visited by Otto of Bamberg, who was entrusted by Bolesław III Wrymouth with the Christianization of Western Pomerania. The name of the town derives from Old-Polabian from the word *gardec < *gordьcь, meaning "small fortified settlement". Following the fragmentation of Poland in 1138 it was part of the separate Duchy of Pomerania, which in 1227 fell under the overlordship of the multi-ethnic Holy Roman Empire. In 1236, the castle was the seat of the local Slavic castellan. In 1249 Gartz was granted town privileges by Duke Barnim I the Good. Because of its strategic location on the river, the town was frequently vulnerable during military campaigns. In 1284, it was one of the Pomeranian towns that guaranteed a peace treaty between the Duchy of Pomerania and the Margraviate of Brandenburg. It was granted several privileges by Pomeranian dukes in the following decades. During a Pomeranian succession war, in 1468, the town opened its gates to Brandenburgians, what was taken in other Pomeranian cities and towns as an act of treason. In 1473, the Duchy of Pomerania made an unsuccessful attempt to recapture the town, however in 1477, with the help of the cities of Stargard and Szczecin, Gartz was finally recaptured, which was confirmed in a subsequent peace treaty. In 1502, Bogislaw X, Duke of Pomerania temporarily resided in the town.

The town was devastated in the Thirty Years' War, the Polish–Swedish War and the Great Northern War in the 17th–18th century. From 1648 to 1720 it was part of Swedish Pomerania, in 1720 it was annexed by Prussia, and from 1871 it formed part of the German Empire. From 1720 to 1945, Gartz was part of the Prussian Province of Pomerania. In the final stages of World War II, in 1945, the town was heavily destroyed. Since the Oder-Neisse line was made the German-Polish border after the defeat of Nazi Germany in the war in 1945, Gartz is now a border town. From 1945 to 1952, it was part of the state of Mecklenburg-Vorpommern, from 1952 to 1990 of the Bezirk Frankfurt of East Germany and since 1990 of Brandenburg. After the fall of communism in Central Europe and the German reunification, in 1990 Gartz entered a partnership with the nearby Polish town of Gryfino as its twin town, and in 1998 river cruises between the towns were launched. In 1990, the town was assigned to the state of Brandenburg, despite historically belonging to Pomerania. In 1993, a Polish-German school project was established at the local school. The town was affected by the 1997 Central European flood. Many Poles moved to Gartz, and as of 2014, 32 of 62 children in the local kindergarten had non-German parents.

== Geography ==
Across the river lies an industrial area of the Polish town of Gryfino. Gartz is part of Lower Oder Valley National Park.

Towns near Gartz

- Szczecin City (Poland)
- Penkun (Germany)
- Schwedt (Germany)
- Gryfino (Poland)

== Demography ==
Development of population since 1875 within the current boundaries (Blue line: Population; Dotted line: Comparison to population development of Brandenburg state; Grey background: Time of Nazi rule; Red background: Time of communist rule)

Residents by country of birth
Nationality	Population (2022)	
Germany	2,005	84.9%
Poland	296	12.5%
Ukraine	14	0.59%

Gartz (Oder): Population development
within the current boundaries (2020)

Year	Pop.	±% p.a.
1875	6,440	—
1890	5,877	−0.61%
1910	5,369	−0.45%
1925	4,830	−0.70%
1933	4,998	+0.43%
1939	5,231	+0.76%
1946	5,430	+0.53%
1950	5,381	−0.23%
1964	4,045	−2.02%
1971	3,699	−1.27%
1981	3,013	−2.03%
1985	2,943	−0.59%
1989	2,835	−0.93%
1990	2,806	−1.02%
1991	2,747	−2.10%

Year	Pop.	±% p.a.
1992	2,668	−2.88%
1993	2,652	−0.60%
1994	2,673	+0.79%
1995	2,714	+1.53%
1996	2,711	−0.11%
1997	2,730	+0.70%
1998	2,754	+0.88%
1999	2,725	−1.05%
2000	2,730	+0.18%
2001	2,703	−0.99%
2002	2,669	−1.26%
2003	2,654	−0.56%
2004	2,647	−0.26%
2005	2,588	−2.23%
2006	2,521	−2.59%

Year	Pop.	±% p.a.
2007	2,505	−0.63%
2008	2,492	−0.52%
2009	2,470	−0.88%
2010	2,477	+0.28%
2011	2,461	−0.65%
2012	2,438	−0.93%
2013	2,470	+1.31%
2014	2,482	+0.49%
2015	2,478	−0.16%
2016	2,515	+1.49%
2017	2,550	+1.39%
2018	2,550	+0.00%
2019	2,508	−1.65%
2020	2,524	+0.64%

== Twin towns ==
Gartz is twinned with:

- Gryfino, Poland
