= Temmen-Ringenwalde =

- Municipality
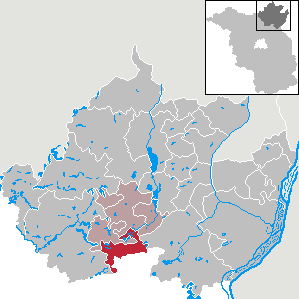
- Location of Temmen-Ringenwalde within Uckermark district
- Interactive map of Temmen-Ringenwalde
- Location within Germany Location within Brandenburg
- Coordinates: 53°03′00″N 13°44′00″E
- Country: Germany
- State: Brandenburg
- District: Uckermark
- Municipal assoc.: Gerswalde

Government
  - Mayor (2024–29): Thomas Rommenhöller

Area
  - Total: 63.18 km^{2} (24.39 sq mi)
- Elevation: 67 m (220 ft)

Population (2025-12-31)
  - Total: 477
  - Density: 7.55/km^{2} (19.6/sq mi)
- Time zone: UTC+01:00 (CET)
  - Summer (DST): UTC+02:00 (CEST)
- Postal codes: 17268
- Dialling codes: 039881
- Vehicle registration: UM
- Website: www.amt-gerswalde.de

Temmen-Ringenwalde is a municipality in the Uckermark district, in Brandenburg, Germany.

== Demography ==
Development of population since 1875 within the current boundaries (Blue line: Population; Dotted line: Comparison to population development of Brandenburg state; Grey background: Time of Nazi rule; Red background: Time of communist rule)

Temmen-Ringenwalde: Population development
within the current boundaries (2017)

Year	Pop.	±% p.a.
1875	962	—
1890	977	+0.10%
1910	841	−0.75%
1925	933	+0.69%
1933	869	−0.88%
1939	894	+0.47%
1946	1,305	+5.55%
1950	1,339	+0.65%
1964	1,073	−1.57%
1971	1,024	−0.67%
1981	831	−2.07%
1985	878	+1.38%
1989	858	−0.57%
1990	849	−1.05%

Year	Pop.	±% p.a.
1991	822	−3.18%
1992	812	−1.22%
1993	813	+0.12%
1994	822	+1.11%
1995	811	−1.34%
1996	791	−2.47%
1997	780	−1.39%
1998	800	+2.56%
1999	796	−0.50%
2000	787	−1.13%
2001	762	−3.18%
2002	769	+0.92%
2003	757	−1.56%
2004	739	−2.38%

Year	Pop.	±% p.a.
2005	737	−0.27%
2006	707	−4.07%
2007	690	−2.40%
2008	664	−3.77%
2009	639	−3.77%
2010	623	−2.50%
2011	577	−7.38%
2012	566	−1.91%
2013	555	−1.94%
2014	538	−3.06%
2015	548	+1.86%
2016	539	−1.64%
2017	530	−1.67%
