= Brüssow =

- Town
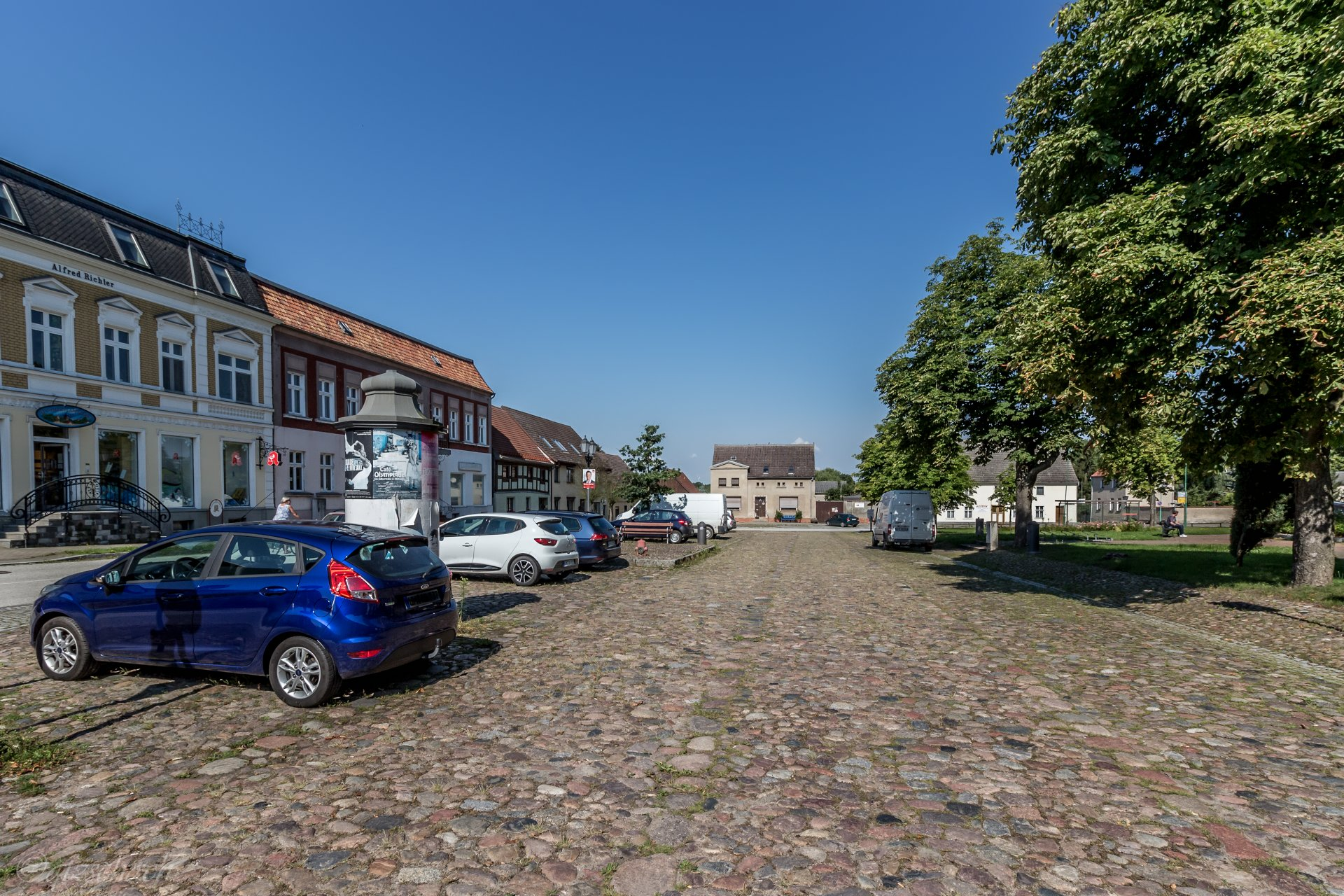
- Market Square

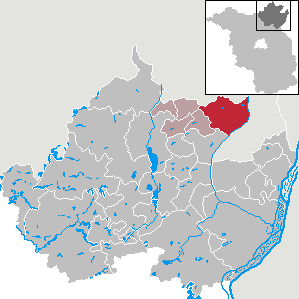
- Location of Brüssow within Uckermark district
- Interactive map of Brüssow
- Location within Germany Location within Brandenburg
- Coordinates: 53°24′N 14°08′E
- Country: Germany
- State: Brandenburg
- District: Uckermark
- Municipal assoc.: Brüssow (Uckermark)

Government
  - Mayor (2024–29): Torsten Eich

Area
  - Total: 101.83 km^{2} (39.32 sq mi)
- Elevation: 55 m (180 ft)

Population (2025-12-31)
  - Total: 1,855
  - Density: 18.22/km^{2} (47.18/sq mi)
- Time zone: UTC+01:00 (CET)
  - Summer (DST): UTC+02:00 (CEST)
- Postal codes: 17326
- Dialling codes: 039742
- Vehicle registration: UM
- Website: www.amt-bruessow.de

Brüssow (German pronunciation: [ˈbʁʏsoː]) is a town in the Uckermark district, in Brandenburg, in north-eastern Germany. It is situated 16 kilometres (10 mi) southeast of Pasewalk, and 27 km (17 mi) west of Szczecin.

== History ==
In 1685, a French Huguenot commune was founded in Battin, now part of Brüssow.

== Demography ==
Development of Population since 1875 within the Current Boundaries (Blue Line: Population; Dotted Line: Comparison to Population Development of Brandenburg state; Grey Background: Time of Nazi rule; Red Background: Time of Communist rule)

According to the 2022 census, Poles constituted 11.5% of the population.

Brüssow: Population development
within the current boundaries (2020)

Year	Pop.	±% p.a.
1875	4,048	—
1890	3,850	−0.33%
1910	3,874	+0.03%
1925	4,163	+0.48%
1939	3,927	−0.42%
1950	5,659	+3.38%
1964	4,242	−2.04%

Year	Pop.	±% p.a.
1971	3,948	−1.02%
1981	3,252	−1.92%
1985	3,159	−0.72%
1990	2,961	−1.29%
1995	2,715	−1.72%
2000	2,604	−0.83%
2005	2,315	−2.33%

Year	Pop.	±% p.a.
2010	2,023	−2.66%
2015	1,876	−1.50%
2016	1,883	+0.37%
2017	1,859	−1.27%
2018	1,831	−1.51%
2019	1,800	−1.69%
2020	1,804	+0.22%
