= Mittenwalde, Uckermark =

Mittenwalde
- Municipality
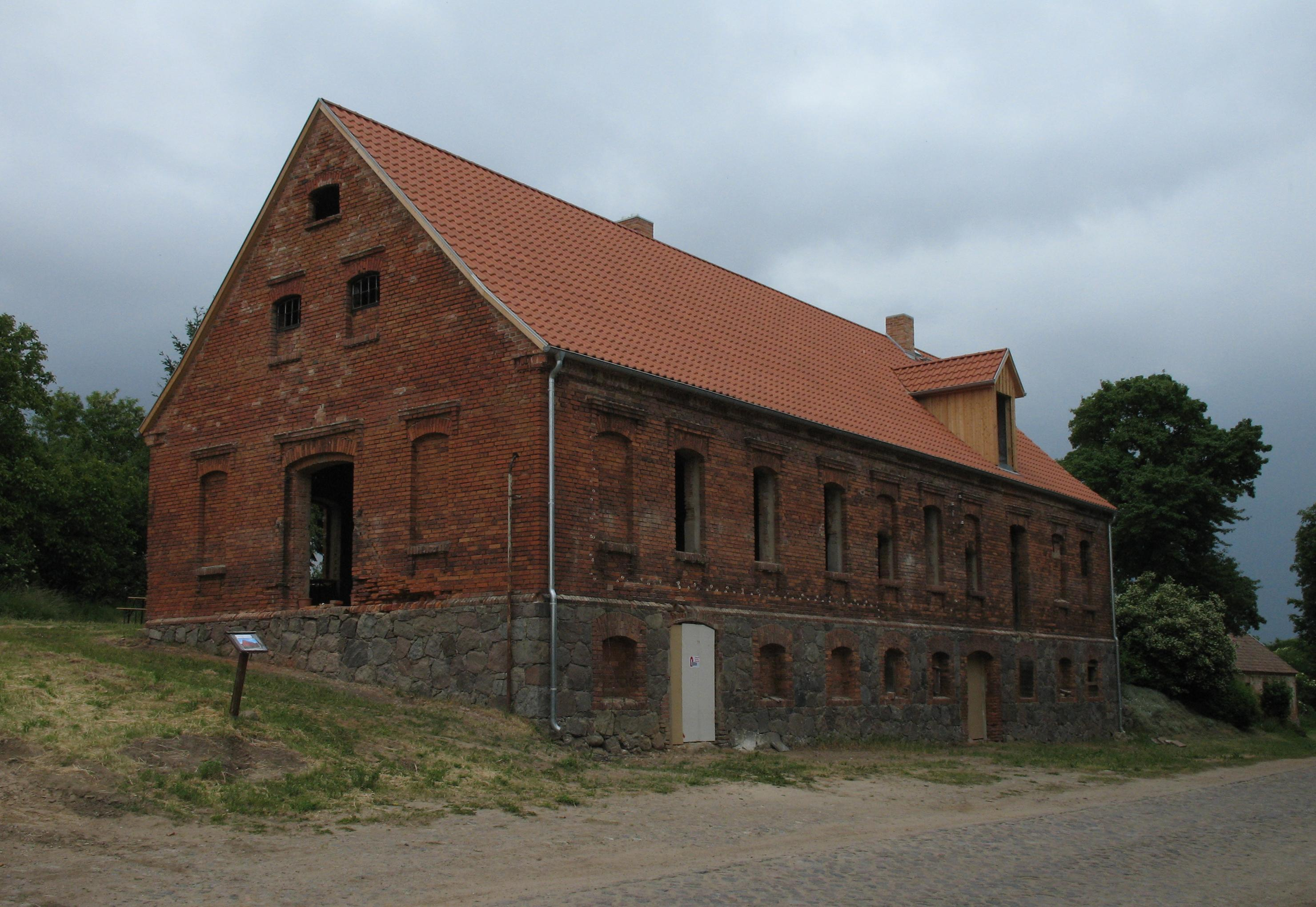
- Former oil mill in Blankensee

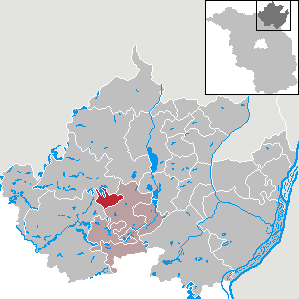
- Location of Mittenwalde within Uckermark district
- Interactive map of Mittenwalde
- Location within Germany Location within Brandenburg
- Coordinates: 53°11′00″N 13°40′00″E
- Country: Germany
- State: Brandenburg
- District: Uckermark
- Municipal assoc.: Gerswalde

Government
  - Mayor (2024–29): Simone Boltz

Area
  - Total: 22.87 km^{2} (8.83 sq mi)
- Elevation: 71 m (233 ft)

Population (2025-12-31)
  - Total: 364
  - Density: 15.9/km^{2} (41.2/sq mi)
- Time zone: UTC+01:00 (CET)
  - Summer (DST): UTC+02:00 (CEST)
- Postal codes: 17268
- Dialling codes: 039884
- Vehicle registration: UM
- Website: www.amt-gerswalde.de

Mittenwalde (German pronunciation: [mɪtn̩ˈvaldə]) is a municipality in the Uckermark district, in Brandenburg, Germany.

== Demography ==
Development of population since 1875 within the current boundaries (Blue line: Population; Dotted line: Comparison to population development of Brandenburg state; Grey background: Time of Nazi rule; Red background: Time of communist rule)

Mittenwalde [Uckermark]: Population development
within the current boundaries (2017)

Year	Pop.	±% p.a.
1875	507	—
1890	382	−1.87%
1910	549	+1.83%
1925	531	−0.22%
1933	621	+1.98%
1939	590	−0.85%
1946	1,152	+10.03%
1950	1,163	+0.24%
1964	795	−2.68%
1971	753	−0.77%
1981	610	−2.08%
1985	581	−1.21%
1989	570	−0.48%
1990	551	−3.33%

Year	Pop.	±% p.a.
1991	536	−2.72%
1992	522	−2.61%
1993	526	+0.77%
1994	527	+0.19%
1995	527	+0.00%
1996	538	+2.09%
1997	518	−3.72%
1998	522	+0.77%
1999	528	+1.15%
2000	508	−3.79%
2001	509	+0.20%
2002	500	−1.77%
2003	494	−1.20%
2004	494	+0.00%

Year	Pop.	±% p.a.
2005	483	−2.23%
2006	462	−4.35%
2007	430	−6.93%
2008	404	−6.05%
2009	399	−1.24%
2010	391	−2.01%
2011	408	+4.35%
2012	406	−0.49%
2013	400	−1.48%
2014	386	−3.50%
2015	372	−3.63%
2016	367	−1.34%
2017	358	−2.45%
