= Lukas Sieper =

German politician (born 1997)

Lukas Sieper MEP
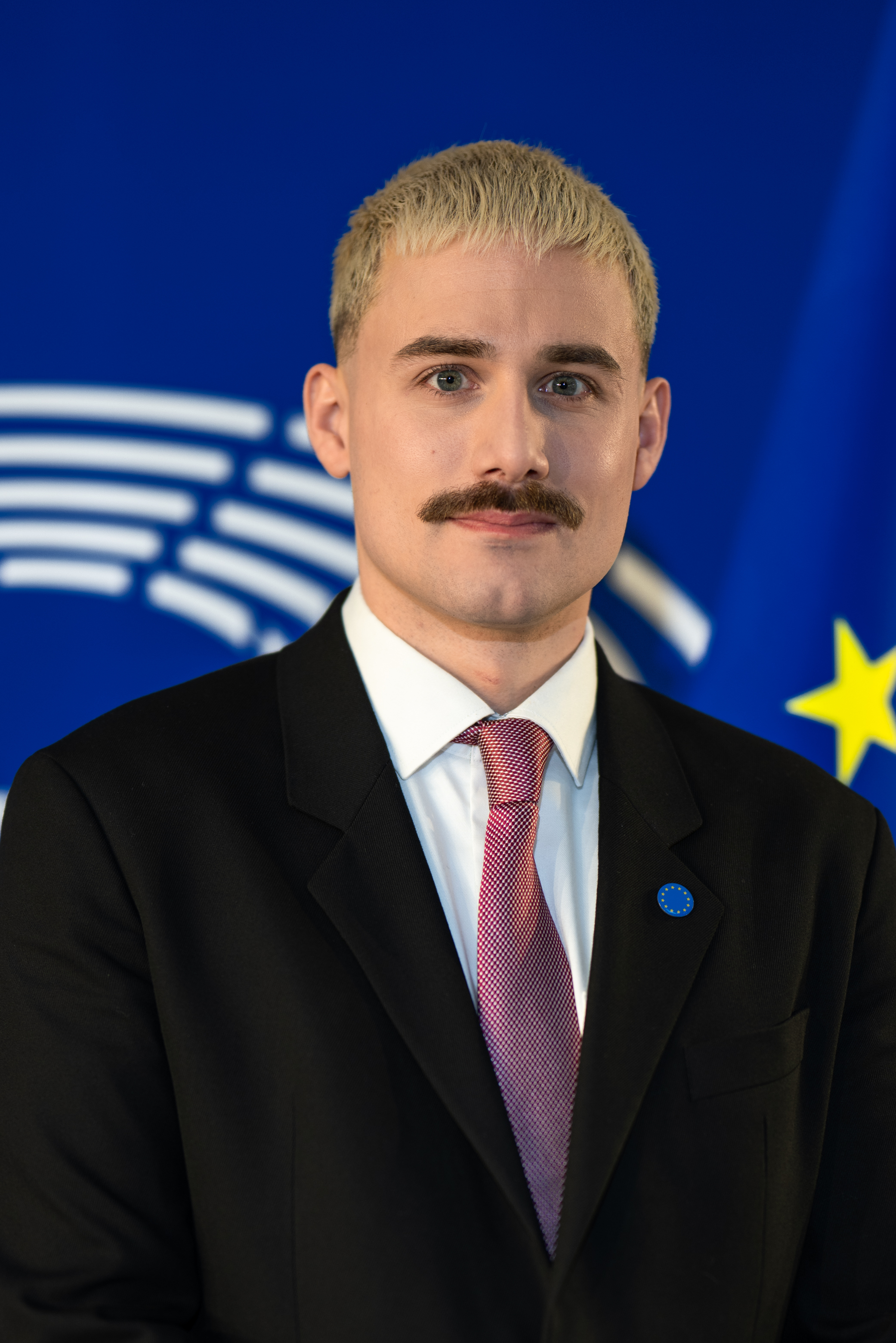

Member of the European Parliament for Germany
- Incumbent
- Assumed office 16 July 2024

Chairman of Party of Progress
- Incumbent
- Assumed office March 2020
- Preceding: Office established

Personal details
- Born: 22 March 1997 (age 29) Bergisch Gladbach, Germany
- Citizenship: German
- Party: Party of Progress (since 2020); Independent (before 2020)
- Other political affiliations: Renew Europe (since 2026); Non-Inscrits (2024–2026)
- Education: University of Cologne
- Website: https://lukas-sieper.de/

Lukas Sieper (born 22 March 1997) is a German politician. In the 2024 European Parliament election, he was elected as the lead candidate of his party (Party of Progress) and has since been a member of the 10th European Parliament.

== Biography ==
=== Education ===
Sieper was educated at the Dietrich-Bonhoeffer-Gymnasium in Wiehl, North Rhine-Westphalia. Between school and university, he undertook voluntary military service in the German Federal Armed Forces. In 2020, he founded the Partei des Fortschritts (Party of Progress; PdF), a grassroots democratic party. He studied law at the University of Cologne, during which he undertook an Erasmus semester at Amsterdam University where he studied International Law and Legal Studies. He passed with honours the first law examination in September 2023. Since 2023, he has been a doctoral student in the Department of Public Law, International Law and European Law at the University of Cologne.

=== Political career ===
In the June 2024 European Parliament election, he was elected as an Member of the European Parliament. He was first on the list for his political party, Partei des Fortschritts (Party of Progress; PdF), which received 228,148 (0.6%) votes in that election, winning one seat. Lukas Sieper is a full member of the Committee on International Trade (INTA), as well as delegations for relations with Iraq (D-IQ), Afghanistan (D-AF), the Euro-Latin American Parliamentary Assembly (DLAT), and the Euronest Parliamentary Assembly (DEPA). Additionally, he serves as a substitute member in the delegations for relations with Mercosur (DMER) and the People’s Republic of China (D-CN).

In September 2025, Sieper was criticized after inviting members of a militia linked to the Rapid Support Forces, a Sudanese paramilitary group that launched a rebellion against the Sudanese government in 2023 and under EU sanctions for carrying out crimes against humanity.

On 9 September 2025, during the visit of the President of Moldova Maia Sandu to the European Parliament, in response to another MEP, Diana Șoșoacă, claiming Moldova is an "artificial state" and that Moldova should be part of Romania, Sieper said that "Moldova is not Romania. Moldova is Europe, just like Romania".

== Political positions ==
Lukas Sieper is politically positioned within the Partei des Fortschritts (PdF), a party that emphasizes pragmatism over ideology, participatory democracy, and evidence-based policymaking. His political orientation reflects a commitment to democratic values, social justice, and technological progress. He advocates for a modernized state guided by transparency, digital innovation, and active civic involvement. Rejecting traditional left-right categorizations, Lukas promotes inclusive policies grounded in human dignity, solidarity, and environmental responsibility, both at the national and European levels.

=== Human rights and anti-discrimination ===
Sieper is a vocal advocate for the protection of minorities and a strong opponent of antisemitism, racism, queerphobia, and ableism. He urges for a society rooted in empathy, where every person can live freely and without fear of hatred. His speeches often call for unity, human dignity, and a society that defends liberal democracy against extremist threats.

=== Digitalization and social media ===
Sieper frequently criticizes the lack of digital competence among older lawmakers and calls for evidence-based digital policy. He emphasizes the dangers of disinformation and algorithmic manipulation on platforms like TikTok.

=== Foreign policy and human rights ===
Sieper supports a values-based foreign policy, advocating for the protection of political prisoners in authoritarian regimes like Belarus and Cuba. He calls for international criminal prosecution of war crimes and stresses that defending democracy abroad is a precondition for defending it at home.

=== Climate and disaster response ===
Sieper sees climate change as the greatest threat to human civilization and calls for immediate, collective action at the European and global level. He has proposed the creation of a Europe-wide disaster relief service and frequently emphasizes the importance of nature-based solutions like forest conservation and wetland restoration.

=== Economy and consumer protection ===
He strongly opposes the import of goods produced through forced labor, especially in contexts like the Uyghur region in China. Sieper advocates for fair trade, robust customs enforcement, and protection of the European single market from unfair competition and unsafe products. He also highlights the importance of maintaining manufacturing in Europe.

=== Education and Erasmus+ ===
Sieper champions education and academic exchange as pillars of European integration. He is a strong supporter of the Erasmus+ program and opposes budget cuts, arguing that investment in youth and education is the best strategy against extremism and social division.

=== Migration ===
On migration, Sieper promotes a pragmatic and rights-based approach. He recognizes migration as a challenge but also as a major opportunity—especially in solving issues like labor shortages and pension system sustainability. He supports weakening rules to allow faster access to work for refugees and illegal migrants.

=== Parliamentary reform and political culture ===
Sieper has repeatedly criticized the use of procedural rules for partisan grandstanding in Parliament. He calls for reforms that foster real debate, respectful disagreement, and genuine deliberation. He views Parliament not just as a legislative chamber, but as the "heartbeat of the European idea" that should live up to its democratic potential.

== See also ==
- Members of the European Parliament (2024–2029)
