= Hohenselchow-Groß Pinnow =

- Municipality
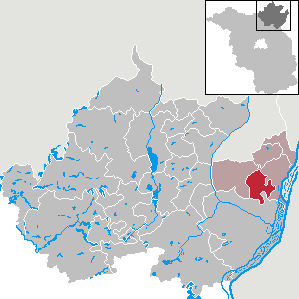
- Location of Hohenselchow-Groß Pinnow within Uckermark district
- Interactive map of Hohenselchow-Groß Pinnow
- Location within Germany Location within Brandenburg
- Coordinates: 53°12′N 14°17′E
- Country: Germany
- State: Brandenburg
- District: Uckermark
- Municipal assoc.: Gartz (Oder)

Government
  - Mayor (2024–29): Angelika Böcker

Area
  - Total: 41.10 km^{2} (15.87 sq mi)
- Elevation: 45 m (148 ft)

Population (2025-12-31)
  - Total: 696
  - Density: 16.9/km^{2} (43.9/sq mi)
- Time zone: UTC+01:00 (CET)
  - Summer (DST): UTC+02:00 (CEST)
- Postal codes: 16306
- Dialling codes: 033331
- Vehicle registration: UM
- Website: www.gartz.de

Hohenselchow-Groß Pinnow is a municipality in the Uckermark district, in Brandenburg, Germany.

== History ==
The municipality of Hohenselchow-Groß Pinnow was formed in 2003 as an amalgamation of the municipalities of Hohenselchow and Groß Pinnow. From 1648 to 1720, the constituent localities of Hohenselchow-Groß Pinnow were part of Swedish Pomerania. From 1720 to 1945, they were part of the Prussian Province of Pomerania, from 1945 to 1952 of the State of Mecklenburg-Vorpommern, from 1952 to 1990 of the Bezirk Frankfurt of East Germany and since 1990 of Brandenburg.

== Demography ==
Development of Population since 1875 within the Current Boundaries (Blue Line: Population; Dotted Line: Comparison to Population Development of Brandenburg state; Grey Background: Time of Nazi rule; Red Background: Time of Communist rule)

Hohenselchow-Groß Pinnow: Population development
within the current boundaries (2020)

Year	Pop.	±% p.a.
1875	1,746	—
1890	1,759	+0.05%
1910	1,346	−1.33%
1925	1,506	+0.75%
1933	1,637	+1.05%
1939	1,642	+0.05%
1946	2,042	+3.16%
1950	2,169	+1.52%
1964	1,733	−1.59%
1971	1,649	−0.71%
1981	1,212	−3.03%
1985	1,113	−2.11%
1989	1,090	−0.52%
1990	1,071	−1.74%
1991	1,015	−5.23%

Year	Pop.	±% p.a.
1992	1,003	−1.18%
1993	980	−2.29%
1994	973	−0.71%
1995	974	+0.10%
1996	982	+0.82%
1997	986	+0.41%
1998	989	+0.30%
1999	968	−2.12%
2000	948	−2.07%
2001	953	+0.53%
2002	915	−3.99%
2003	903	−1.31%
2004	888	−1.66%
2005	880	−0.90%
2006	882	+0.23%

Year	Pop.	±% p.a.
2007	870	−1.36%
2008	873	+0.34%
2009	871	−0.23%
2010	853	−2.07%
2011	818	−4.10%
2012	795	−2.81%
2013	792	−0.38%
2014	795	+0.38%
2015	817	+2.77%
2016	785	−3.92%
2017	780	−0.64%
2018	765	−1.92%
2019	759	−0.78%
2020	738	−2.77%
