= Tantow =

- Municipality
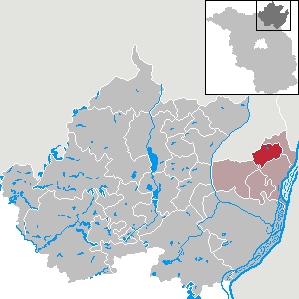
- Location of Tantow within Uckermark district
- Interactive map of Tantow
- Location within Germany Location within Brandenburg
- Coordinates: 53°16′00″N 14°20′00″E
- Country: Germany
- State: Brandenburg
- District: Uckermark
- Municipal assoc.: Gartz (Oder)

Government
  - Mayor (2024–29): Silke Natter

Area
  - Total: 35.38 km^{2} (13.66 sq mi)
- Elevation: 18 m (59 ft)

Population (2025-12-31)
  - Total: 736
  - Density: 20.8/km^{2} (53.9/sq mi)
- Time zone: UTC+01:00 (CET)
  - Summer (DST): UTC+02:00 (CEST)
- Postal codes: 16307
- Dialling codes: 033333
- Vehicle registration: UM
- Website: www.gartz.de

Tantow is a municipality in the Uckermark district, in Brandenburg, Germany.

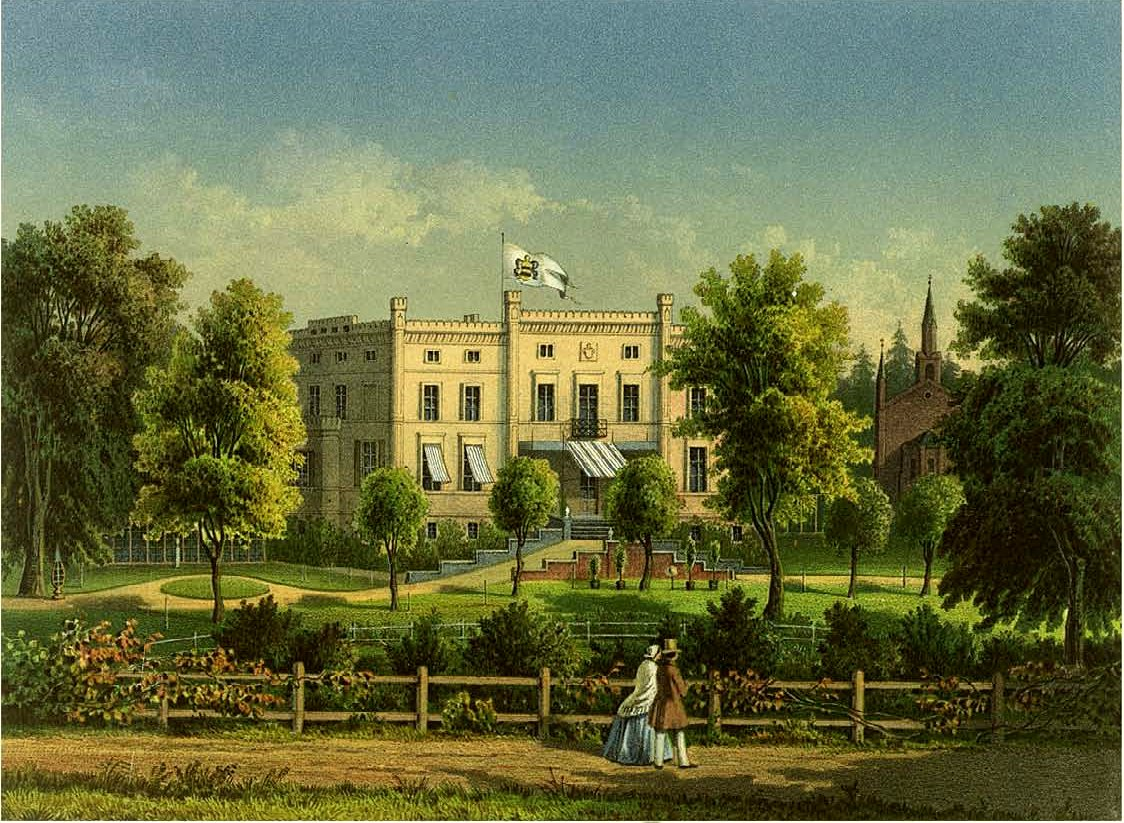
Palace Tantow around 1860, Edition by Alexander Duncker

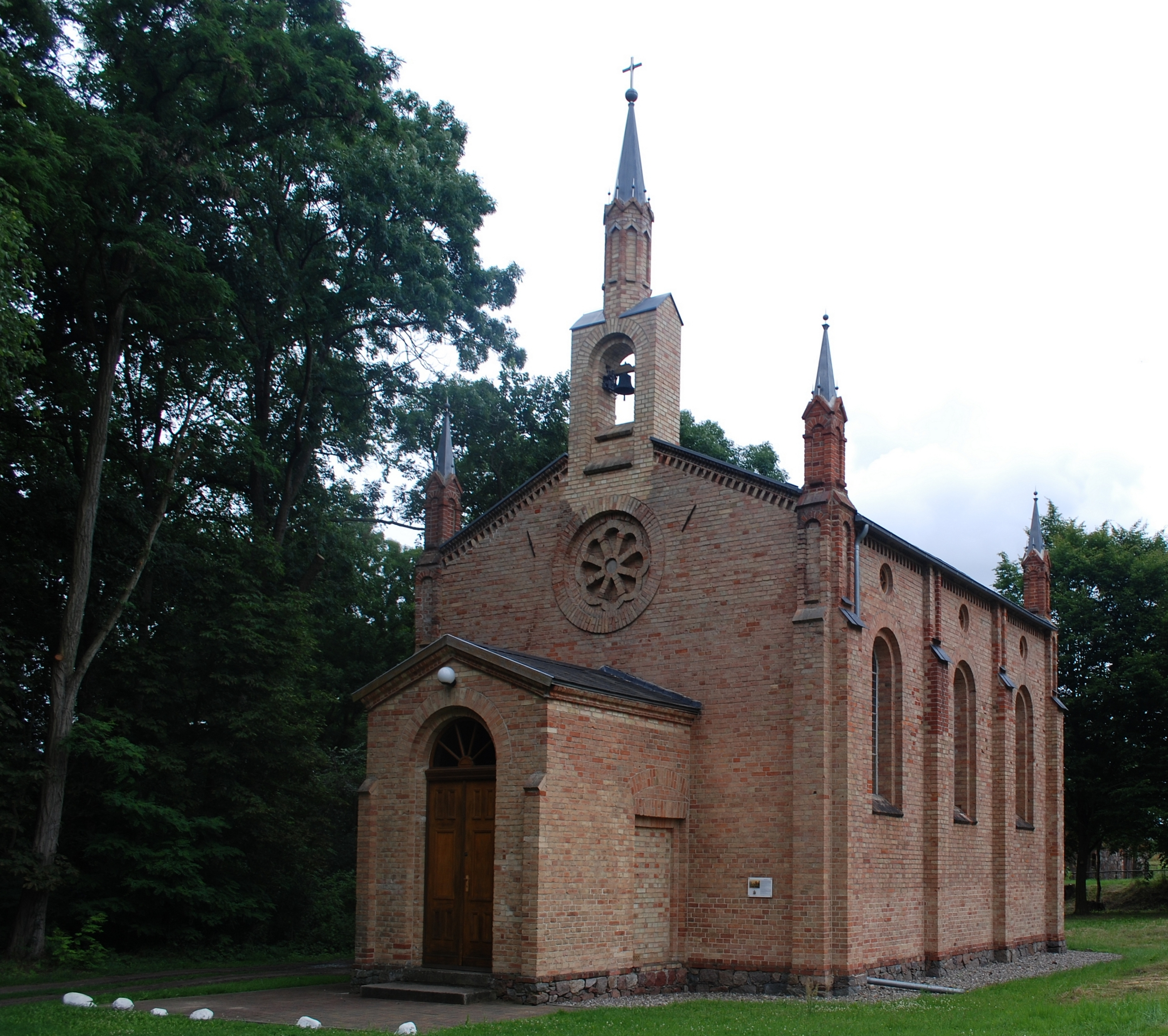
Tantow, Church

== Demography ==
Development of population since 1875 within the current boundaries (Blue line: Population; Dotted line: Comparison to population development of Brandenburg state; Grey background: Time of Nazi rule; Red background: Time of communist rule)

Tantow: Population development
within the current boundaries (2020)

Year	Pop.	±% p.a.
1875	899	—
1890	1,028	+0.90%
1910	965	−0.32%
1925	1,369	+2.36%
1933	1,275	−0.89%
1939	1,227	−0.64%
1946	1,970	+7.00%
1950	2,013	+0.54%
1964	1,575	−1.74%
1971	1,461	−1.07%
1981	1,086	−2.92%
1985	988	−2.34%
1989	913	−1.95%
1990	910	−0.33%
1991	901	−0.99%

Year	Pop.	±% p.a.
1992	877	−2.66%
1993	850	−3.08%
1994	854	+0.47%
1995	838	−1.87%
1996	847	+1.07%
1997	860	+1.53%
1998	849	−1.28%
1999	845	−0.47%
2000	825	−2.37%
2001	802	−2.79%
2002	797	−0.62%
2003	795	−0.25%
2004	787	−1.01%
2005	754	−4.19%
2006	744	−1.33%

Year	Pop.	±% p.a.
2007	742	−0.27%
2008	756	+1.89%
2009	755	−0.13%
2010	776	+2.78%
2011	753	−2.96%
2012	749	−0.53%
2013	734	−2.00%
2014	756	+3.00%
2015	763	+0.93%
2016	780	+2.23%
2017	801	+2.69%
2018	814	+1.62%
2019	825	+1.35%
2020	772	−6.42%
