= Mescherin =

- Municipality
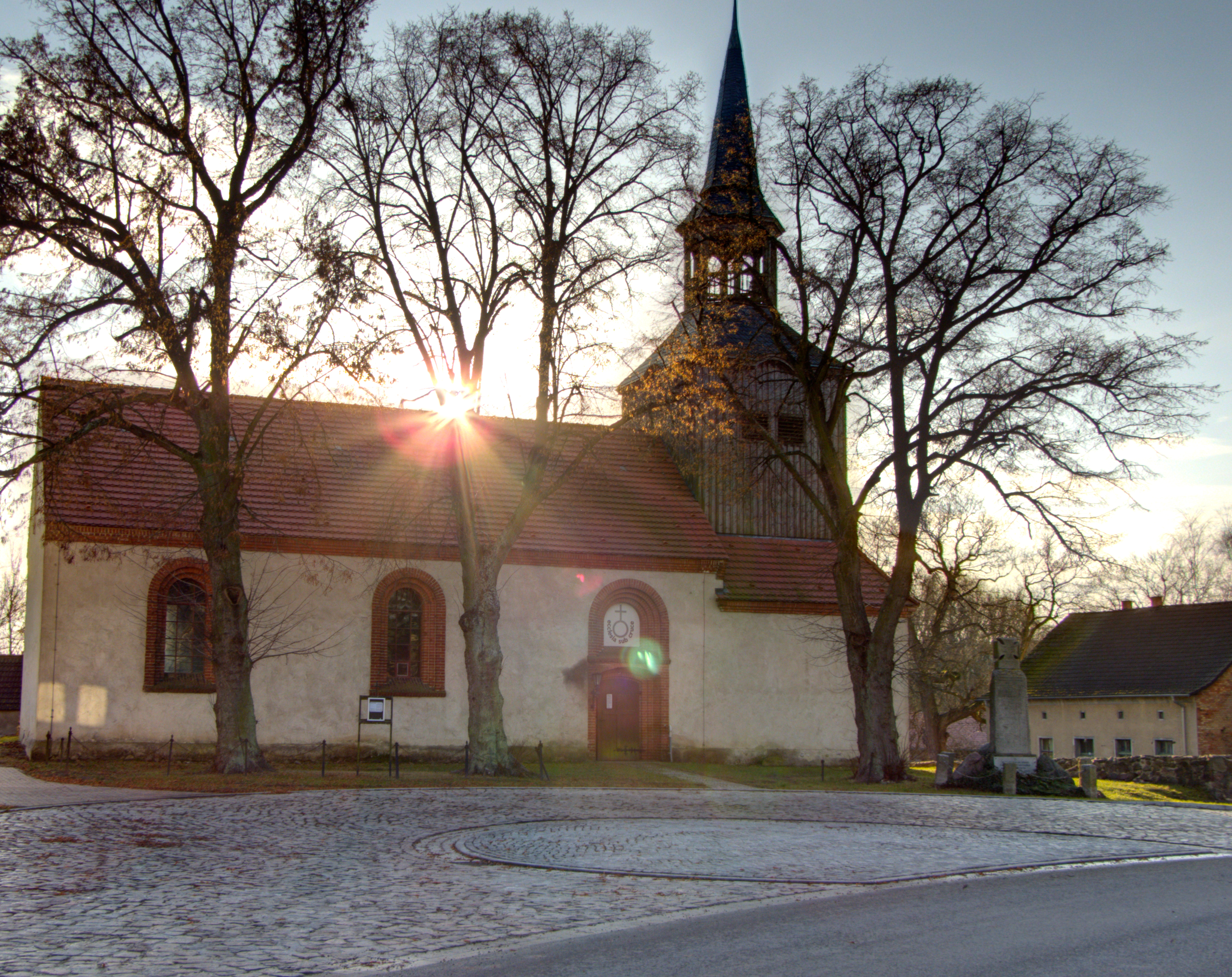
- Church in Mescherin

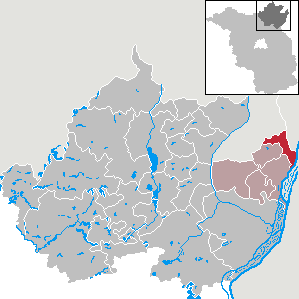
- Location of Mescherin within Uckermark district
- Interactive map of Mescherin
- Location within Germany Location within Brandenburg
- Coordinates: 53°15′00″N 14°26′00″E
- Country: Germany
- State: Brandenburg
- District: Uckermark
- Municipal assoc.: Gartz (Oder)

Government
  - Mayor (2024–29): Udo Augustinat

Area
  - Total: 30.96 km^{2} (11.95 sq mi)
- Elevation: 4 m (13 ft)

Population (2025-12-31)
  - Total: 740
  - Density: 24/km^{2} (62/sq mi)
- Time zone: UTC+01:00 (CET)
  - Summer (DST): UTC+02:00 (CEST)
- Postal codes: 16307
- Dialling codes: 033332
- Vehicle registration: UM
- Website: www.gartz.de

Mescherin is a municipality in the Uckermark district, in Brandenburg, in north-eastern Germany. It is located on the western shore of the Oder river and the German-Polish border.

== Overview ==
A road bridge links Mescherin with the Polish-Pomeranian town of Gryfino across the river. The nearest city is Szczecin, about 20 km (12 mi) to the north. Mescherin is located on the northern edge of Lower Oder Valley National Park.

On December 31, 2002, the municipalities of Neurochlitz, Radekow and Rosow were incorporated into Mescherin. In Rosow, a 13th-century church serves as a joint German-Polish memorial site for the flight and expulsion of Germans during and after World War II and the resettlement of Poles from Soviet-annexed eastern Polish territory into former eastern German provinces which became part of Poland in 1945. Rosow was chosen as the Pomeranian village became a border checkpoint of both the federal highway Bundesstraße 2 and the Berlin-Szczecin railway.

== Demography ==
Development of population since 1875 within the current Boundaries (Blue Line: Population; Dotted Line: Comparison to Population development in Brandenburg state; Grey Background: Time of Nazi Germany; Red Background: Time of communist East Germany)

Mescherin: Population development
within the current boundaries (2020)

Year	Pop.	±% p.a.
1875	2,221	—
1890	1,950	−0.86%
1910	1,948	−0.01%
1925	1,711	−0.86%
1933	1,622	−0.67%
1939	1,630	+0.08%
1946	1,914	+2.32%
1950	1,982	+0.88%
1964	1,549	−1.75%
1971	1,460	−0.84%
1981	1,021	−3.51%
1985	964	−1.43%
1989	864	−2.70%
1990	856	−0.93%
1991	809	−5.49%

Year	Pop.	±% p.a.
1992	821	+1.48%
1993	827	+0.73%
1994	859	+3.87%
1995	856	−0.35%
1996	848	−0.93%
1997	843	−0.59%
1998	824	−2.25%
1999	863	+4.73%
2000	857	−0.70%
2001	832	−2.92%
2002	809	−2.76%
2003	800	−1.11%
2004	785	−1.88%
2005	776	−1.15%
2006	778	+0.26%

Year	Pop.	±% p.a.
2007	783	+0.64%
2008	777	−0.77%
2009	788	+1.42%
2010	785	−0.38%
2011	760	−3.18%
2012	791	+4.08%
2013	784	−0.88%
2014	795	+1.40%
2015	786	−1.13%
2016	802	+2.04%
2017	825	+2.87%
2018	825	+0.00%
2019	822	−0.36%
2020	820	−0.24%
