= Nordwestuckermark =

- Municipality
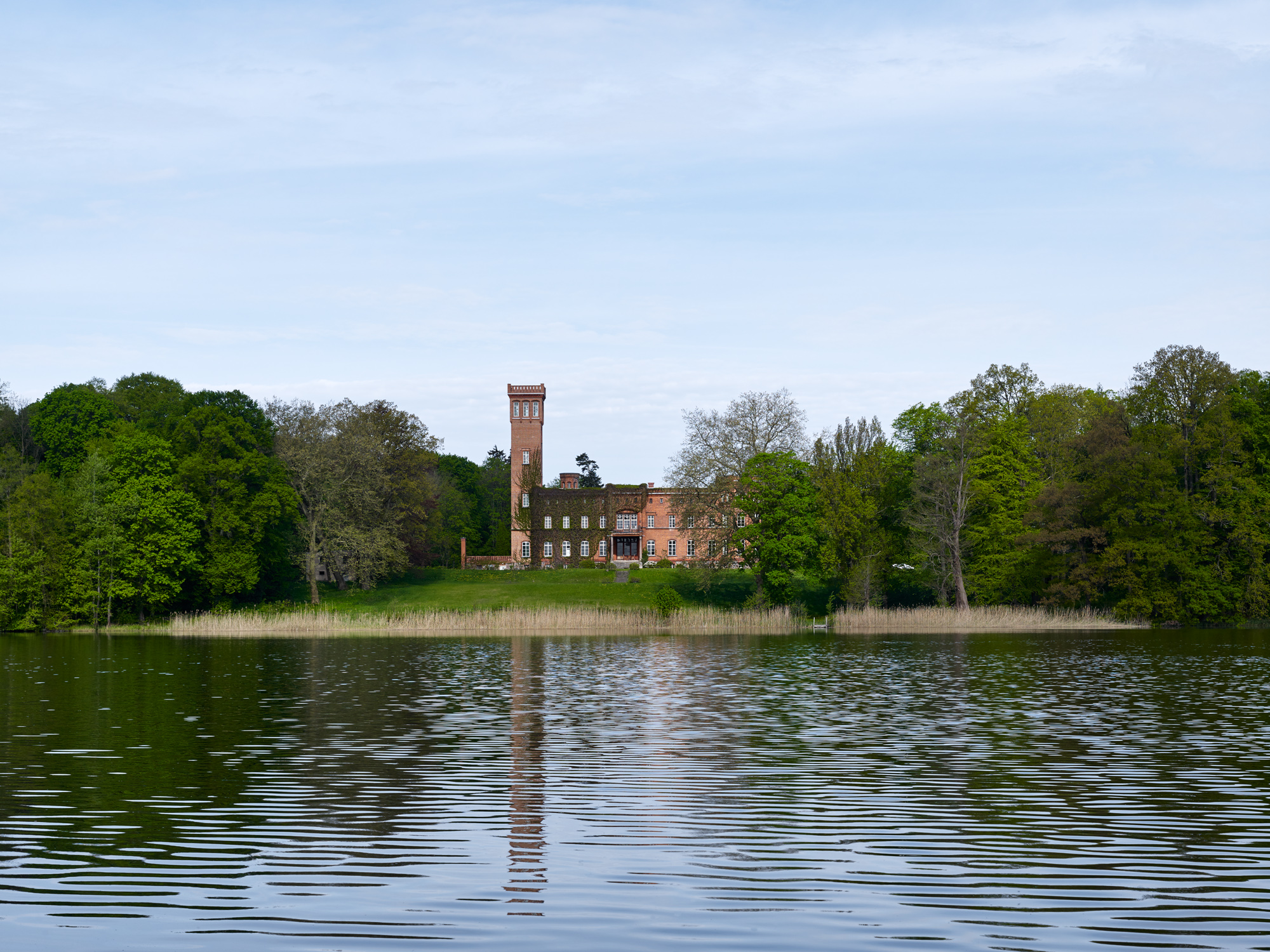

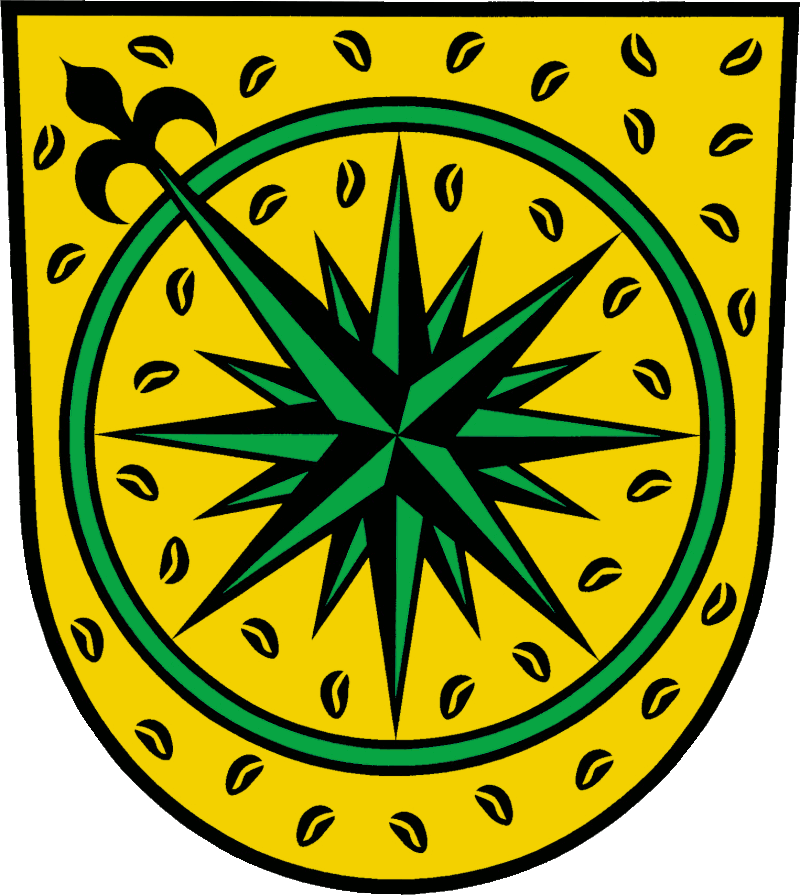
- Coat of arms

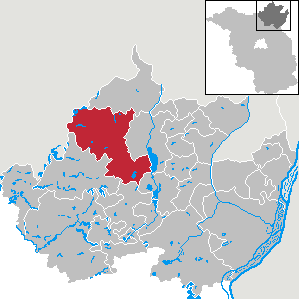
- Location of Nordwestuckermark within Uckermark district
- Interactive map of Nordwestuckermark
- Location within Germany Location within Brandenburg
- Coordinates: 53°23′N 13°40′E
- Country: Germany
- State: Brandenburg
- District: Uckermark

Government
  - Mayor (2020–28): Roland Klatt

Area
  - Total: 253.14 km^{2} (97.74 sq mi)
- Elevation: 80 m (260 ft)

Population (2025-12-31)
  - Total: 4,036
  - Density: 15.94/km^{2} (41.29/sq mi)
- Time zone: UTC+01:00 (CET)
  - Summer (DST): UTC+02:00 (CEST)
- Postal codes: 17291
- Dialling codes: 039852, 039859
- Vehicle registration: UM
- Website: www.gemeinde-nordwestuckermark.de

Nordwestuckermark (German pronunciation: [nɔʁtˈvɛstʔʊkɐˌmaʁk], lit. 'Northwest Uckermark') is a municipality in the Uckermark district, in Brandenburg, in north-eastern Germany.

== History and community structure ==
The community Nordwestuckermark was formed on 1 November 2001 from the previously independent municipalities Ferdinandshorst, Fürstenwerder, Gollmitz, Kraatz, Naugarten, Röpersdorf/Sternhagen, Schapow, Schönermark und Weggun (Amt Nordwestuckermark) and the municipality Holzendorf (department Prenzlau-Land).

The community Nordwestuckermark has the following districts:

- Ferdinandshorst
- Fürstenwerder
- Gollmitz
- Holzendorf
- Kraatz
- Naugarten
- Röpersdorf/Sternhagen
- Schapow
- Schönermark
- Weggun

During the final stages of World War II, on 8 February 1945, Wittstock (now part of Schönermark) was the site of a stopover during the German-organised march of some 2,700 French prisoners of war from the Oflag II-B camp headed westwards.

== Demography ==
Development of population since 1875 within the current Boundaries (Blue Line: Population; Dotted Line: Comparison to Population development in Brandenburg state; Grey Background: Time of Nazi Germany; Red Background: Time of communist East Germany)

Recent Population Development and Projections (Population Development before Census 2011 (blue line); Recent Population Development according to the Census in Germany in 2011 (blue bordered line); Official projections for 2005-2030 (yellow line); for 2017-2030 (scarlet line); for 2020-2030 (green line)

Nordwestuckermark: Population development
within the current boundaries (2020)

Year	Pop.	±% p.a.
1875	8,210	—
1890	7,665	−0.46%
1910	7,704	+0.03%
1925	7,868	+0.14%
1939	7,439	−0.40%
1950	11,413	+3.97%
1964	8,481	−2.10%

Year	Pop.	±% p.a.
1971	7,920	−0.97%
1981	6,301	−2.26%
1985	5,964	−1.36%
1990	5,659	−1.04%
1995	5,546	−0.40%
2000	5,512	−0.12%
2005	5,164	−1.30%

Year	Pop.	±% p.a.
2010	4,762	−1.61%
2015	4,288	−2.08%
2016	4,272	−0.37%
2017	4,248	−0.56%
2018	4,209	−0.92%
2019	4,194	−0.36%
2020	4,182	−0.29%

== Photo gallery ==
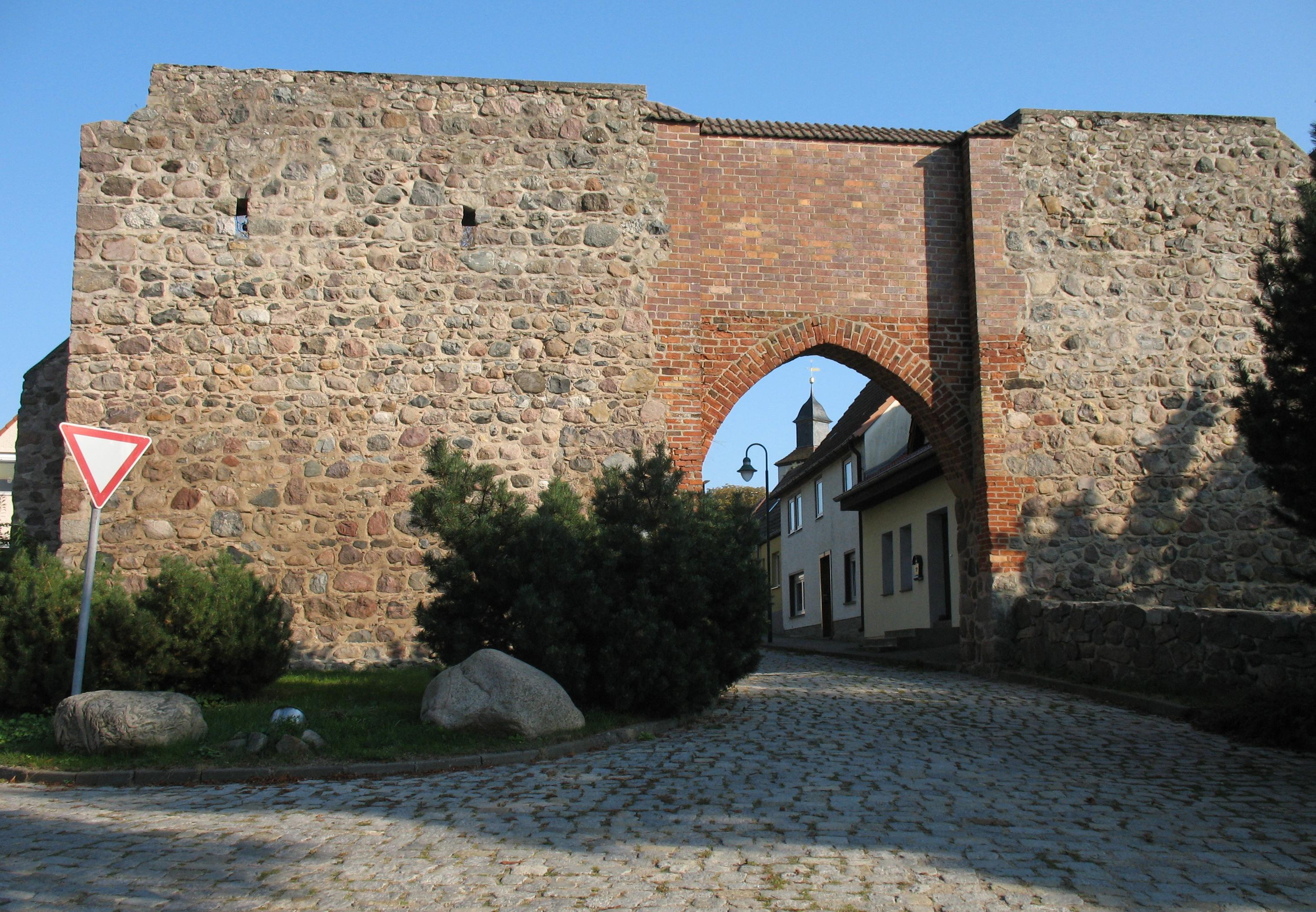
Woldegk Gate in Fürstenwerder

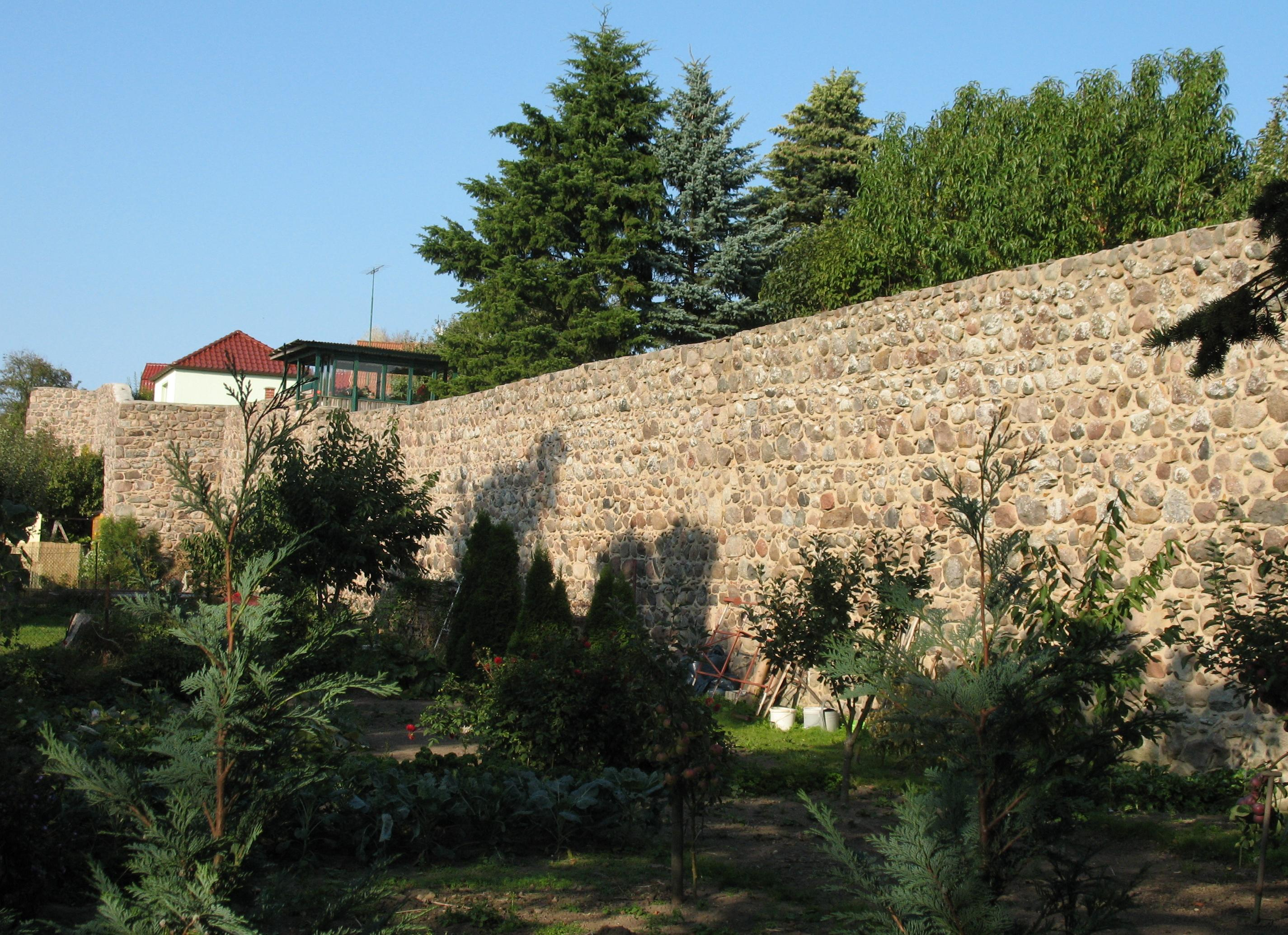
Defensive wall in Fürstenwerder

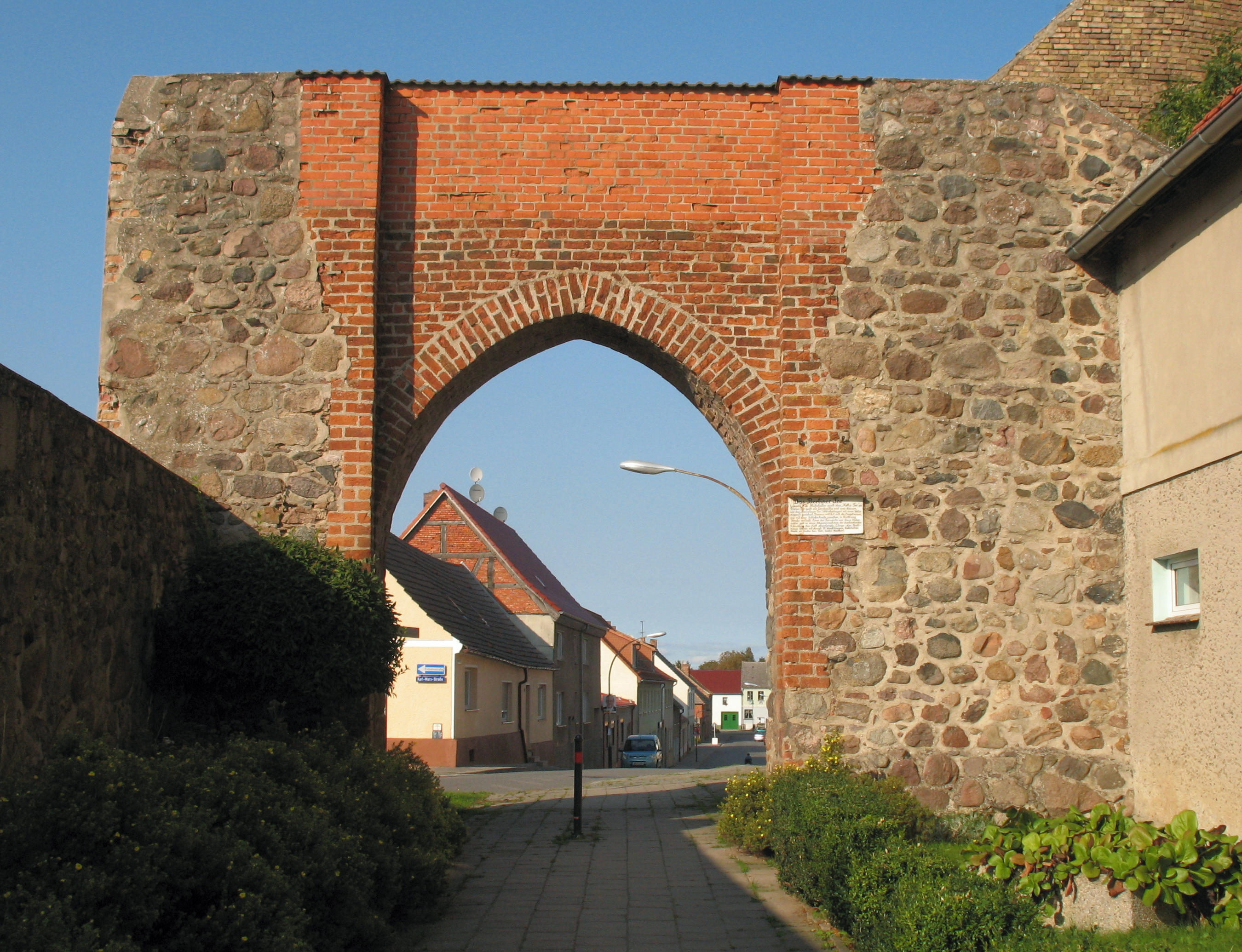
Berlin Gate in Fürstenwerder

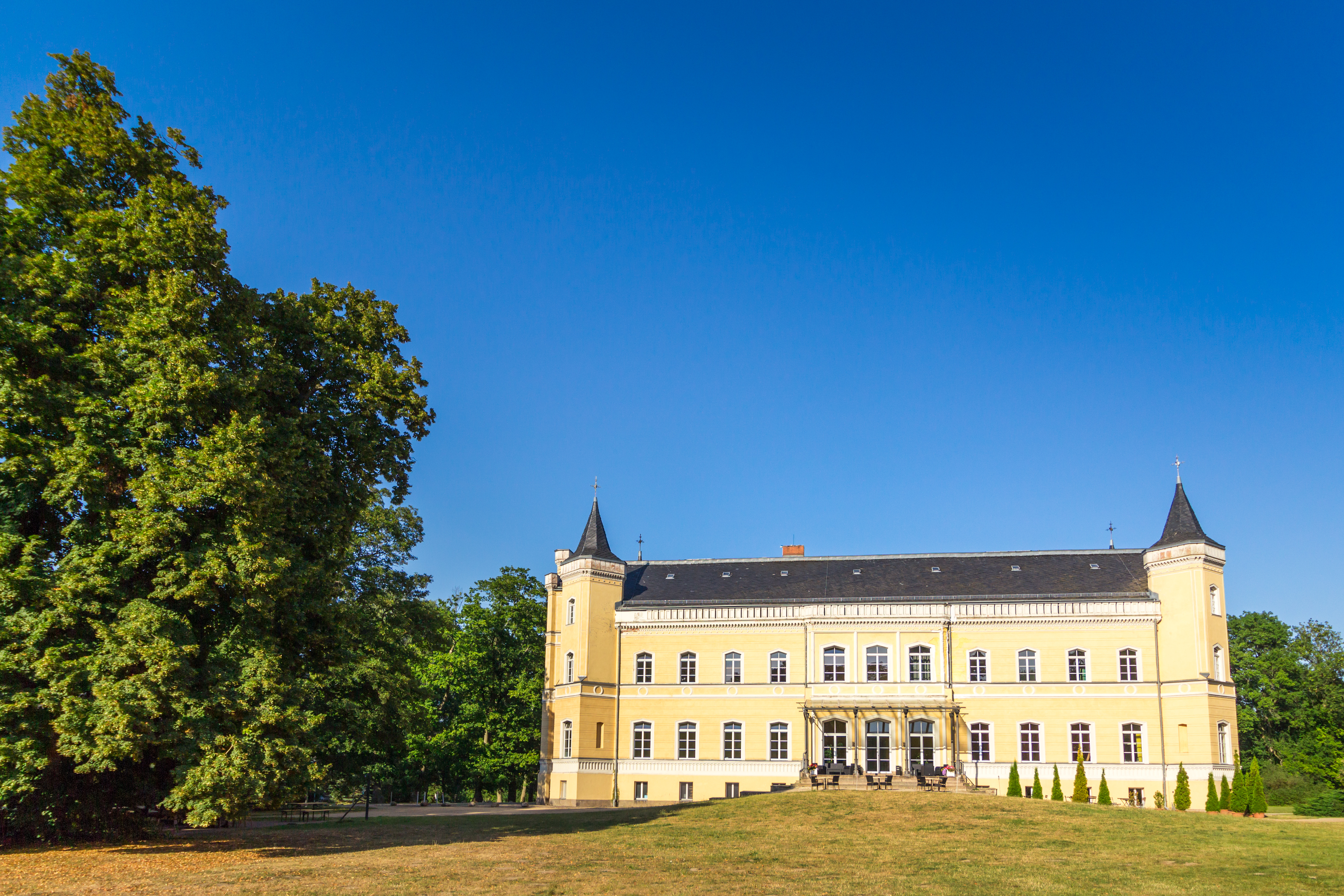
Kröchlendorff Palace

== See also ==
- Fürstenwerder
- Großer See
