= Schenkenberg, Brandenburg =

Schenkenberg
- Municipality
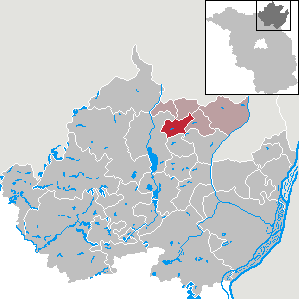
- Location of Schenkenberg within Uckermark district
- Interactive map of Schenkenberg
- Location within Germany Location within Brandenburg
- Coordinates: 53°22′1″N 13°57′0″E
- Country: Germany
- State: Brandenburg
- District: Uckermark
- Municipal assoc.: Brüssow (Uckermark)

Government
  - Mayor (2024–29): Thomas Golz

Area
  - Total: 30.04 km^{2} (11.60 sq mi)
- Elevation: 43 m (141 ft)

Population (2025-12-31)
  - Total: 616
  - Density: 20.5/km^{2} (53.1/sq mi)
- Time zone: UTC+01:00 (CET)
  - Summer (DST): UTC+02:00 (CEST)
- Postal codes: 17291
- Dialling codes: 039851
- Vehicle registration: UM
- Website: www.amt-bruessow.de

Schenkenberg is a municipality in the Uckermark district, in Brandenburg, Germany.

== Demography ==
Development of population since 1875 within the current boundaries (Blue line: Population; Dotted line: Comparison to population development of Brandenburg state; Grey background: Time of Nazi rule; Red background: Time of communist rule)

Schenkenberg [Uckermark]: Population development
within the current boundaries (2017)

Year	Pop.	±% p.a.
1875	1,225	—
1890	1,165	−0.33%
1910	1,475	+1.19%
1925	1,536	+0.27%
1933	1,384	−1.29%
1939	1,263	−1.51%
1946	1,877	+5.82%
1950	2,040	+2.10%
1964	1,785	−0.95%
1971	1,657	−1.06%
1981	1,216	−3.05%
1985	1,127	−1.88%
1989	1,077	−1.13%
1990	1,051	−2.41%

Year	Pop.	±% p.a.
1991	1,025	−2.47%
1992	999	−2.54%
1993	994	−0.50%
1994	971	−2.31%
1995	937	−3.50%
1996	944	+0.75%
1997	944	+0.00%
1998	959	+1.59%
1999	938	−2.19%
2000	951	+1.39%
2001	732	−23.03%
2002	720	−1.64%
2003	707	−1.81%
2004	689	−2.55%

Year	Pop.	±% p.a.
2005	667	−3.19%
2006	636	−4.65%
2007	639	+0.47%
2008	634	−0.78%
2009	629	−0.79%
2010	583	−7.31%
2011	603	+3.43%
2012	603	+0.00%
2013	572	−5.14%
2014	586	+2.45%
2015	600	+2.39%
2016	609	+1.50%
2017	625	+2.63%
