= Brüssow (Amt) =

Brüssow (Uckermark)
- Amt
- Map of Uckermark highlighting Brüssow (Uckermark)
- Interactive map of Brüssow (Uckermark)
- Location within Germany Location within Brandenburg
- Coordinates: 53°24′N 14°07′E
- Country: Germany
- State: Brandenburg
- District: Uckermark
- Seat: Brüssow
- Subdivisions: 5 municipalities

Area
  - Total: 218.84 km^{2} (84.49 sq mi)

Population (2025-12-31)
  - Total: 4,355
  - Density: 19.90/km^{2} (51.54/sq mi)
- Time zone: UTC+01:00 (CET)
  - Summer (DST): UTC+02:00 (CEST)
- Website: www.amt-bruessow.de

Amt Brüssow (Uckermark) is an Amt ("collective municipality") in the district of Uckermark, in Brandenburg, Germany. Its seat is in Brüssow.

The Amt Brüssow (Uckermark) consists of the following municipalities:

1. Brüssow
2. Carmzow-Wallmow
3. Göritz
4. Schenkenberg
5. Schönfeld

== Demography ==
Development of population since 1875 within the current Boundaries (Blue Line: Population; Dotted Line: Comparison to Population development in Brandenburg state; Grey Background: Time of Nazi Germany; Red Background: Time of communist East Germany)

Recent Population Development and Projections (Population Development before Census 2011 (blue line); Recent Population Development according to the Census in Germany in 2011 (blue bordered line); Official projections for 2005-2030 (yellow line); for 2017-2030 (scarlet line); for 2020-2030 (green line)

Amt Brüssow (Uckermark): Population development
within the current boundaries (2020)

Year	Pop.	±% p.a.
1875	7,349	—
1890	6,977	−0.35%
1910	7,929	+0.64%
1925	8,603	+0.55%
1939	7,882	−0.62%
1950	12,019	+3.91%
1964	9,254	−1.85%
1971	8,697	−0.88%
1981	7,105	−2.00%

Year	Pop.	±% p.a.
1985	6,996	−0.39%
1990	6,620	−1.10%
1995	6,177	−1.38%
2000	5,997	−0.59%
2005	5,261	−2.58%
2010	4,721	−2.14%
2015	4,505	−0.93%
2020	4,416	−0.40%
2025	4,355	−0.28%
