= Party of Progress (Germany) =

Party of Progress Partei des Fortschritts
- Abbreviation: PdF
- Leader: Lukas Sieper; Michelle Kahlich
- Presidium: Erik Oetjen; Luca Piwodda; Artemij Kiel; Armin Schmeling; Peter Klaus; Bastian Große; Mustafa Kramer-Resit; Heike Herden; Christian Hickel; Paul Strauß; Kilian Ebert; Diana Neumann; Tim Koch
- Founder: Lukas Sieper; Lukas Reis; Carlo Lüdorf
- Founded: March 2020
- Headquarters: Esserstraße 2, 51105 Köln
- Youth wing: Young. Political. Good-looking. (Jung. Politisch. Gutaussehend.)
- Membership (2026): 1000
- Ideology: Grassroots democracy Social liberalism Pro-Europeanism
- Political position: Centre-left
- European affiliation: European Democratic Party (since 2026)
- European Parliament group: Renew Europe (since 2026); Non-Inscrits (2024–2026)
- Colours: Orange; Turquoise; White
- Bundestag: 0 / 630
- State Parliaments: 0 / 1,855
- European Parliament: 1 / 96

Website
- partei-des-fortschritts.de

The Party of Progress (German: Partei des Fortschritts, PdF), also known as Party of Progress – Free Parliamentary Alliance (PdF–FPA) is a political party in Germany founded in Cologne in 2020. While the party sees itself as being beyond the left–right political spectrum, it is classified as left-liberal by political scientists.

The PdF claims to be active throughout Germany. Joining the PdF is not tied to German nationality and, according to the party's statutes, is open to every resident of Germany and every EU citizen. In the 2024 European elections in Germany, it received 0.6% of the vote and entered the European Parliament with one Member of the European Parliament. In 2024, Luca Piwodda was elected as the mayor of Gartz (Oder). In May 2025, Tim Sieper became the mayor of Eckenroth after his father Michael stepped down due to issues concerning his health. With that, Sieper became Germany's youngest mayor to date at age 20.

== History ==
The Party of Progress ran for the first time in the NRW local elections in the Cologne- Kalk constituency and received 20 votes there. Its second participation in the election took place in the 2021 German federal election, where it received 3,228 votes. At the state level, the PdF ran for the first time in the 2022 North Rhine-Westphalia state election, where it won 0.1% of all second votes with 6,154 votes.

The Party of Progress was admitted to the June 2024 European Parliament election and was thus eligible to stand for election throughout Germany for the first time. It received 0.6% of the vote and thus a seat in the European Parliament, as there is no threshold in European elections. Party leader Lukas Sieper was elected. Luca Piwodda was elected mayor of Gartz (Oder) in the same year.

In the September 2024 Saxony state election the PdF won 248 votes (0.01%). On 18 May, 2025, the PdF held their 19th Federal Party Conference (German: Bundesparteitag) in Hanover, where they officially announced the creation of the party's youth wing, JPG (Jung. Politisch. Gutaussehend.). Kilian Ebert and Pauline Leist were elected as co-chairpersons of the JPG, with Ole Hamann being elected deputy chairperson. They also elected a new presidium, with Erik Oetjen, Luca Piwodda, Artemij Kiel and Paul Strauß retaining their posts in the presidium. The Party of Progress also plans to take part in the state elections in Baden-Württemberg, Berlin, Rhineland-Palatinate and Saxony-Anhalt. The PdF also had two major candidates in the 2025 North Rhine-Westphalia local elections, Joel Cristobal Chamorro in Wiehl and Heike Flora Herden in Cologne. In May 2025, Tim Sieper became the mayor of Eckenroth after his father Michael stepped down due to issues concerning his health. With that, Sieper became Germany's youngest mayor to date at age 20.

On September 19, 2025, the party announced that the merger with the Free Citizens of Central Germany, which had been planned for several months, had been completed. This gave the PdF a total of 69 seats, including several city and local council seats in the Mansfeld-Südharz district, as well as (local) mayoral offices. Effective immediately, these seats will operate under the name Party of Progress–Free Citizens of Central Germany (PdF–FBM). Andreas Koch was mayor of Mansfeld.

On March 21, 2026, the delegates of the annual party congress elected Lukas Sieper and Michelle Kahlich as co-presidents of the PdF. Sieper also announced that he'd be joining Renew Europe, a move that was ratified by the party on the same day. On April 9, 2026, the party announced that it joined the European Democratic Party (EDP). At the same time, it's youth wing also joined the Young Democrats for Europe.

== Programme ==
Basic principles

The PdF sees one of the main problems of politics in Germany as clientelist politics. It is of the opinion that the democratic competition of opinions provided for in the Basic Law has been reinterpreted as a competition between different social groups for influence and power to shape things.

The basic program deals with issues at the state, federal and European level. The PdF advocates "pragmatic democracy" beyond the ideological categories of right and left, which is to be achieved through referendums. The Basic Law is given particular importance. In addition, everyone should be treated equally regardless of external characteristics, religion or culture, and the weakest should be protected. Those who are capable should, on the other hand, be able to benefit from their achievements.

In addition, lobbying in politics, which the party considers undemocratic, is to be combatted through transparency. The party also comments on topics that are currently being discussed in current German affairs. The PdF is against Upload-Filter, and for new regulations on drug policy and for IT training for young citizens.

=== Human rights and values ===
The basic program begins with a commitment to the Basic Law and democracy, which is seen as the only solution to reconcile conflicting interests and ideologies within society. The PdF sees the state as having a responsibility to enable all citizens to participate equally in social and political development, regardless of any characteristics such as gender, religion, origin, external characteristics, sexuality or culture. The party is also committed to the social market economy.

=== Social image ===
The Party of Progress sees the basic principles of society in a democratic guarantee of freedom and security for citizens. It sees the state as having the primary responsibility to serve the people. Society as a whole should seek a balance between the personal freedom of individuals and the interests of the whole. In the eyes of the party, solidarity and humanity oblige the individual to support everyone. Weaker parts of society should not be ignored, for example, but at the same time everyone who works hard and honestly should also be able to enjoy the fruits of their labour. The Party of Progress states that society should not impose values on individuals, but should ensure that everyone can live out their personal values.

=== Digitalisation ===
The PdF sees the comprehensive digitisation of all areas, including public administration and government processes, as a basic prerequisite for the progress of society. To achieve this, it says, broadcast media should be expanded and network neutrality should be guaranteed.

=== European policy ===
The Party of Progress is committed to the European community of values, the European single market and supranational European integration. At the European level, it is committed to strengthening and expanding the European Parliament as the only directly democratically legitimized body of the EU. In addition, bureaucratic processes in the European Parliament, the European Commission and the Council of the European Union should be made more tangible for the population. According to the party, Germany should significantly advance the project of European integration and take on a pioneering role. The Party also supports the expansion of the European internal market, the European financial world and the common European security and defense policy.

=== Internal security ===
The PdF sees the state as having an obligation to protect its population and their rights. To this end, it demands that there should be no ungoverned areas in either the analogue or digital space.

=== Social policy and labour market ===
With regard to social and labour market policy, the PdF is committed to the principle of the welfare state and supports an increase in the minimum wage for care workers, the reform of the pension system, the improved reintegration of the unemployed and job seekers, the expansion of permanent employment contracts, further incentives for part-time retirement, equality between the genders in the labour market and the promotion of partnerships for all genders, including a pluralistic image of the family.

=== Education and research ===
With regard to education and research, the PdF calls for nationwide uniform educational standards, the simplification of educational paths, priority-oriented funding, the simplification of access to second-chance education, significantly smaller class sizes, free afternoon/homework supervision, the introduction of modern subjects, the digitization of teaching materials, the integration of children with a migrant background and better teacher training.

=== Transport and mobility ===
For the PdF, the expansion of local and long-distance public transport, rail freight and investments in new technologies are basic requirements for a functioning transport system in the future. To this end, it is committed to strengthening public passenger transport, promoting alternative drives, shifting freight transport to rail and opposing the privatization of roads.

=== Environmental policy and agriculture ===
The Party of Progress recognizes climate change as one of the greatest challenges for Germany and calls for an ideology-free and scientifically based environmental policy. In addition to fulfilling climate protection agreements and agreed climate protection goals, it works to preserve biodiversity, subsidize small and medium-sized agricultural businesses and maintain soil fertility. The Party of Progress advocates the "preservation of biodiversity" and calls for a "significant part of the land used by humans to be ecologically upgraded again".

=== Resources and energy policy ===
The PdF wants a more consistent and structured energy transition. To achieve this, it is focusing on the promotion of renewable energies, the expansion of energy storage, the establishment of a safe final storage facility for nuclear waste, the improvement of Germany's energy efficiency and waste avoidance.

=== Integration policy ===
For effective integration and inclusion, the Party of Progress is in favour of issuing work visas to committed asylum seekers, educating asylum seekers, returning rejected asylum seekers to their safe places of origin, abolishing the right to asylum in the event of criminal offences, reducing the costs of asylum seekers and establishing the identity of asylum seekers.

=== Geopolitical policy ===
The PdF is committed to the United Nations and human rights as the foundations for peace, freedom and justice. In their view, war is not a means of politics.

=== Economy, finance and taxes ===
In order to enable the state to act, the PdF considers stable state finances to be necessary. It also advocates the fight against tax fraud, the reduction of bureaucracy for start-ups and the promotion of a start-up culture in schools and universities.

== Party structure ==
The PdF is divided into a federal association, 16 state associations and district associations corresponding to the constituencies of the German Bundestag . The federal association determines the general political direction of the party. The state association determines the party's position on all issues of state politics . The district associations control the party's local politics and are mainly responsible for direct communication with citizens and voters.

=== Party parliaments ===
The central program organ of the PdF are the party parliaments. These take on the function of a program party conference that meets on a permanent basis and are held before the party conferences in accordance with Section 9 of the Party Law. Membership in the party parliament is independent of membership in the Party of Progress. This means that non-members have equal rights to contribute to the PdF's programs, even if their votes are scaled down compared to the votes of members as a safeguard against extremist and undemocratic infiltration.

The PdF has permanent party parliaments at all levels. These serve as a permanent party congress and are intended to find answers to current issues.

The federal party parliament ratifies the programmatic and political goals of the federal association. It formulates the party's official positions on goals for society as a whole or current issues. Its members are appointed by the federal association upon written application. Applications are open to any member and are made informally. The state party parliaments send assessors to the federal party parliament. They have the right to speak but not to vote.

The state party parliament ratifies the programmatic and political goals of the respective state association. It formulates the official positions of the state association on state-specific or current issues. Its members are elected by the state association from among its members. Any member can apply and submits a written declaration to the chairman of the state association. Every 10 district associations sends one assessor to the federal party parliament. These district associations must be geographically or programmatically related.

The district party parliament formulates the programmatic and political goals of the district association. It sets the goals and concerns of the district association. Its members are initially elected by the district association from among its members. Each district association can appoint representatives of civil society or personalities of regional importance to its district party parliament at its own discretion. The number of MPs who are also members of the party must always be more than half of the MPs.

Two thirds of the party parliaments are made up of party members and one third are non-members from various associations. The party's political lines are determined in the parliaments

The meetings of the party parliaments take place online and in hybrid form. Voting takes place in a decentralized manner.

=== Working groups ===
There are two types of working groups in the Party of Progress: Some are subdivisions of the party parliaments and are responsible for individual current issues, certain program papers or election programs. Like the party parliaments, they are also open to non-members. The others are organizational working groups that are legitimized by the executive board and to which only members and individually approved supporters have access. Like the party parliaments, the working groups meet primarily digitally. The working groups provide suggestions for solving problems that are taken up by the parliaments. Anyone can participate in the working groups as long as the points discussed concern them personally.

=== Financing ===
The PdF is financed primarily through donations. The party wants to operate independently of large donations and lobbyists and therefore tries to acquire supporters and small donors. The membership fee is voluntary, which is intended to facilitate participation in the democratic process within the party.

=== Federal state parties ===
The Party for Progress has the following state parties:

Federal state party	Spokesperson	Chairperson	Foundation	Membership	As of
Baden-Württemberg	Daniel Putz	Klaus Boldt	10 November 2024	—	2025
Bavaria	Ralf Lembach	Jürgen Lindolf	—	—	2024
Berlin	Salem Rezik	Babak Rohani	—	—	2025
Brandenburg	Karolin Werkmeister	Dennis Latzke	16 November 2024	—	2024
Bremen	Patrick Söhnen	Hartmut Meya	—	—	2025
Hamburg	Gabriele Brumm	Marco Ruddat	27 October 2024	—	2024
Hesse	Leon Elias Pfeiffer	Niklas Klein	—	—	2025
Lower Saxony	Christian Hickel	Sebastian Hahn	13 November 2024	—	2024
Saxony	Agata Trofimiak; Adrian Weber	Luka Götze	—	—	2025
Saxony-Anhalt	Jenny Rinoa Rosenau	Felix Neumann	—	—	2025
Schleswig-Holstein	Matthias Riedinger	Mike Albertsen	18 May 2025		2025
North Rhine-Westphalia	Heike Herden	Marcel Huckestein	25 August 2024	217	2025
Mecklenburg-Vorpommern	Christian Stapel	Bastian Große	–		2026
Rhineland-Palatinate	Kevin Schmidt	Lars Schier	15 December 2024	—	2024
Thuringia	Michelle Kahlich	Kai Koppmann	—	—	2025

== Election results ==
=== Federal parliament (Bundestag) ===
Election	Leader	Constituency		Party list		Seats	+/–	Government
Election	Leader	Votes	%	Votes	%	Seats	+/–	Government
2021	Lukas Sieper	—N/a		3,228	0.01 (#38)	0 / 735	New	Extra-parliamentary
2025	Lukas Sieper	1,282	0.00 (#25)	21,377	0.04 (#18)	0 / 630	0	Extra-parliamentary

=== European Parliament ===
Election	List leader	Votes	%	Seats	+/–	EP Group
2024	Lukas Sieper	227,631	0.57 (#15)	1 / 96	New	Renew
