= Amt Gartz (Oder) =

Collective municipality in Brandenburg state, Germany

Gartz (Oder)
- Amt
- Map of Uckermark highlighting Gartz (Oder)
- Interactive map of Gartz (Oder)
- Location within Germany Location within Brandenburg
- Coordinates: 53°12′N 14°23′E
- Country: Germany
- State: Brandenburg
- District: Uckermark
- Seat: Gartz
- Subdivisions: 5 municipalities

Area
  - Total: 264.15 km^{2} (101.99 sq mi)

Population (2025-12-31)
  - Total: 6,200
  - Density: 23/km^{2} (61/sq mi)
- Time zone: UTC+01:00 (CET)
  - Summer (DST): UTC+02:00 (CEST)
- Website: www.gartz.de

Amt Gartz (Oder) is an Amt ("collective municipality") in the district of Uckermark, in Brandenburg, Germany. Its seat is in Gartz.

The Amt Gartz (Oder) consists of the following municipalities:

1. Casekow
2. Gartz
3. Hohenselchow-Groß Pinnow
4. Mescherin
5. Tantow

== Demography ==
About 2000 inhabitants are Polish.

Development of population since 1875 within the current Boundaries (Blue Line: Population; Dotted Line: Comparison to Population development in Brandenburg state; Grey Background: Time of Nazi Germany; Red Background: Time of communist East Germany)

Recent Population Development and Projections (Population Development before Census 2011 (blue line); Recent Population Development according to the Census in Germany in 2011 (blue bordered line); Official projections for 2005-2030 (yellow line); for 2020-2030 (green line); for 2017-2030 (scarlet line)

Amt Gartz (Oder): Population development
within the current boundaries (2020)

Year	Pop.	±% p.a.
1875	13,932	—
1890	13,233	−0.34%
1910	12,328	−0.35%
1925	12,778	+0.24%
1939	13,079	+0.17%
1950	16,704	+2.25%
1964	12,560	−2.02%
1971	11,809	−0.88%
1981	9,231	−2.43%

Year	Pop.	±% p.a.
1985	8,796	−1.20%
1990	8,371	−0.99%
1995	8,074	−0.72%
2000	7,895	−0.45%
2005	7,343	−1.44%
2010	7,057	−0.79%
2015	6,737	−0.92%
2020	6,724	−0.04%
2025	6,200	−1.61%
