= Milmersdorf =

- Municipality
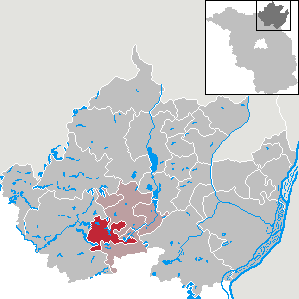
- Location of Milmersdorf within Uckermark district
- Interactive map of Milmersdorf
- Location within Germany Location within Brandenburg
- Coordinates: 53°07′00″N 13°39′00″E
- Country: Germany
- State: Brandenburg
- District: Uckermark
- Municipal assoc.: Gerswalde

Government
  - Mayor (2024–29): Elke Grabowski

Area
  - Total: 62.86 km^{2} (24.27 sq mi)
- Elevation: 60 m (200 ft)

Population (2025-12-31)
  - Total: 1,373
  - Density: 21.84/km^{2} (56.57/sq mi)
- Time zone: UTC+01:00 (CET)
  - Summer (DST): UTC+02:00 (CEST)
- Postal codes: 17268
- Dialling codes: 039886
- Vehicle registration: UM
- Website: www.amt-gerswalde.de

Milmersdorf is a municipality in the Uckermark district, in Brandenburg, Germany.

== Demography ==
Development of population since 1875 within the current boundaries (Blue line: Population; Dotted line: Comparison to population development of Brandenburg state; Grey background: Time of Nazi rule; Red background: Time of communist rule)

Milmersdorf: Population development
within the current boundaries (2017)

Year	Pop.	±% p.a.
1875	888	—
1890	747	−1.15%
1910	777	+0.20%
1925	916	+1.10%
1933	878	−0.53%
1939	835	−0.83%
1946	1,326	+6.83%
1950	1,297	−0.55%
1964	2,525	+4.87%
1971	2,717	+1.05%
1981	2,617	−0.37%
1985	2,572	−0.43%
1989	2,543	−0.28%
1990	2,561	+0.71%

Year	Pop.	±% p.a.
1991	2,472	−3.48%
1992	2,413	−2.39%
1993	2,149	−10.94%
1994	2,122	−1.26%
1995	2,092	−1.41%
1996	2,082	−0.48%
1997	2,053	−1.39%
1998	1,995	−2.83%
1999	1,958	−1.85%
2000	1,927	−1.58%
2001	1,884	−2.23%
2002	1,860	−1.27%
2003	1,837	−1.24%
2004	1,813	−1.31%

Year	Pop.	±% p.a.
2005	1,814	+0.06%
2006	1,791	−1.27%
2007	1,766	−1.40%
2008	1,716	−2.83%
2009	1,650	−3.85%
2010	1,626	−1.45%
2011	1,531	−5.84%
2012	1,500	−2.02%
2013	1,452	−3.20%
2014	1,459	+0.48%
2015	1,466	+0.48%
2016	1,448	−1.23%
2017	1,447	−0.07%
