= Gerswalde (Amt) =

- Amt
- Map of Uckermark highlighting Gerswalde
- Interactive map of Gerswalde
- Location within Germany Location within Brandenburg
- Coordinates: 53°08′N 13°45′E
- Country: Germany
- State: Brandenburg
- District: Uckermark
- Seat: Gerswalde
- Subdivisions: 5 municipalities

Area
  - Total: 293.93 km^{2} (113.49 sq mi)

Population (2025-12-31)
  - Total: 4,145
  - Density: 14.10/km^{2} (36.52/sq mi)
- Time zone: UTC+01:00 (CET)
  - Summer (DST): UTC+02:00 (CEST)
- Website: www.amt-gerswalde.de

Amt Gerswalde is an Amt ("collective municipality") in the district of Uckermark in Brandenburg, Germany. Its seat is in Gerswalde.

The Amt Gerswalde consists of the following municipalities:

1. Flieth-Stegelitz
2. Gerswalde
3. Milmersdorf
4. Mittenwalde
5. Temmen-Ringenwalde

== Demography ==
Development of population since 1875 within the current Boundaries (Blue Line: Population; Dotted Line: Comparison to Population development in Brandenburg state; Grey Background: Time of Nazi Germany; Red Background: Time of communist East Germany)

Recent Population Development and Projections (Population Development before Census 2011 (blue line); Recent Population Development according to the Census in Germany in 2011 (blue bordered line); Official projections for 2005-2030 (yellow line); for 2017-2030 (scarlet line); for 2020-2030 (green line)

Amt Gerswalde: Population development
within the current boundaries (2020)

Year	Pop.	±% p.a.
1875	6,896	—
1890	6,320	−0.58%
1910	6,326	+0.00%
1925	6,566	+0.25%
1939	6,355	−0.23%
1950	9,671	+3.89%
1964	8,569	−0.86%
1971	8,568	−0.00%
1981	7,295	−1.60%

Year	Pop.	±% p.a.
1985	7,183	−0.39%
1990	7,011	−0.48%
1995	6,222	−2.36%
2000	5,963	−0.85%
2005	5,548	−1.43%
2010	4,943	−2.28%
2015	4,536	−1.70%
2020	4,448	−0.39%
2025	4,145	−1.40%
