= Gerswalde =

- Municipality
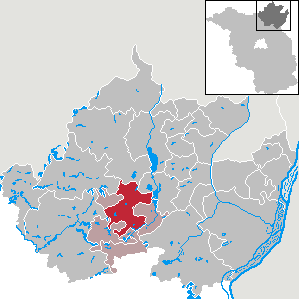
- Location of Gerswalde within Uckermark district
- Interactive map of Gerswalde
- Location within Germany Location within Brandenburg
- Coordinates: 53°10′00″N 13°46′00″E
- Country: Germany
- State: Brandenburg
- District: Uckermark
- Municipal assoc.: Gerswalde

Government
  - Mayor (2024–29): Eva-Maria Meister (CDU)

Area
  - Total: 96.79 km^{2} (37.37 sq mi)
- Elevation: 52 m (171 ft)

Population (2025-12-31)
  - Total: 1,431
  - Density: 14.78/km^{2} (38.29/sq mi)
- Time zone: UTC+01:00 (CET)
  - Summer (DST): UTC+02:00 (CEST)
- Postal codes: 17268
- Dialling codes: 039887
- Vehicle registration: UM
- Website: www.gerswalde-uckermark.de

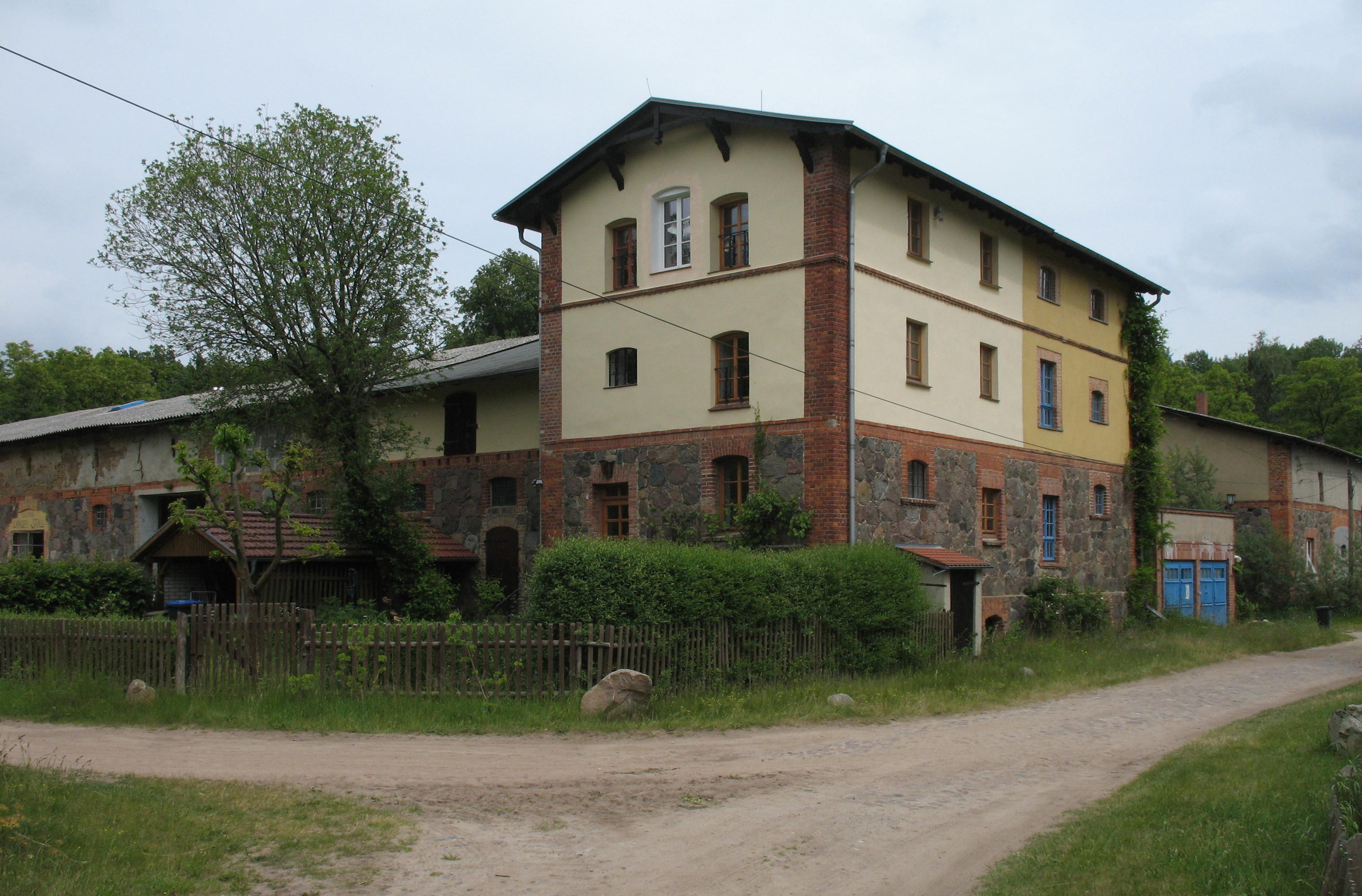
Arnimswalde

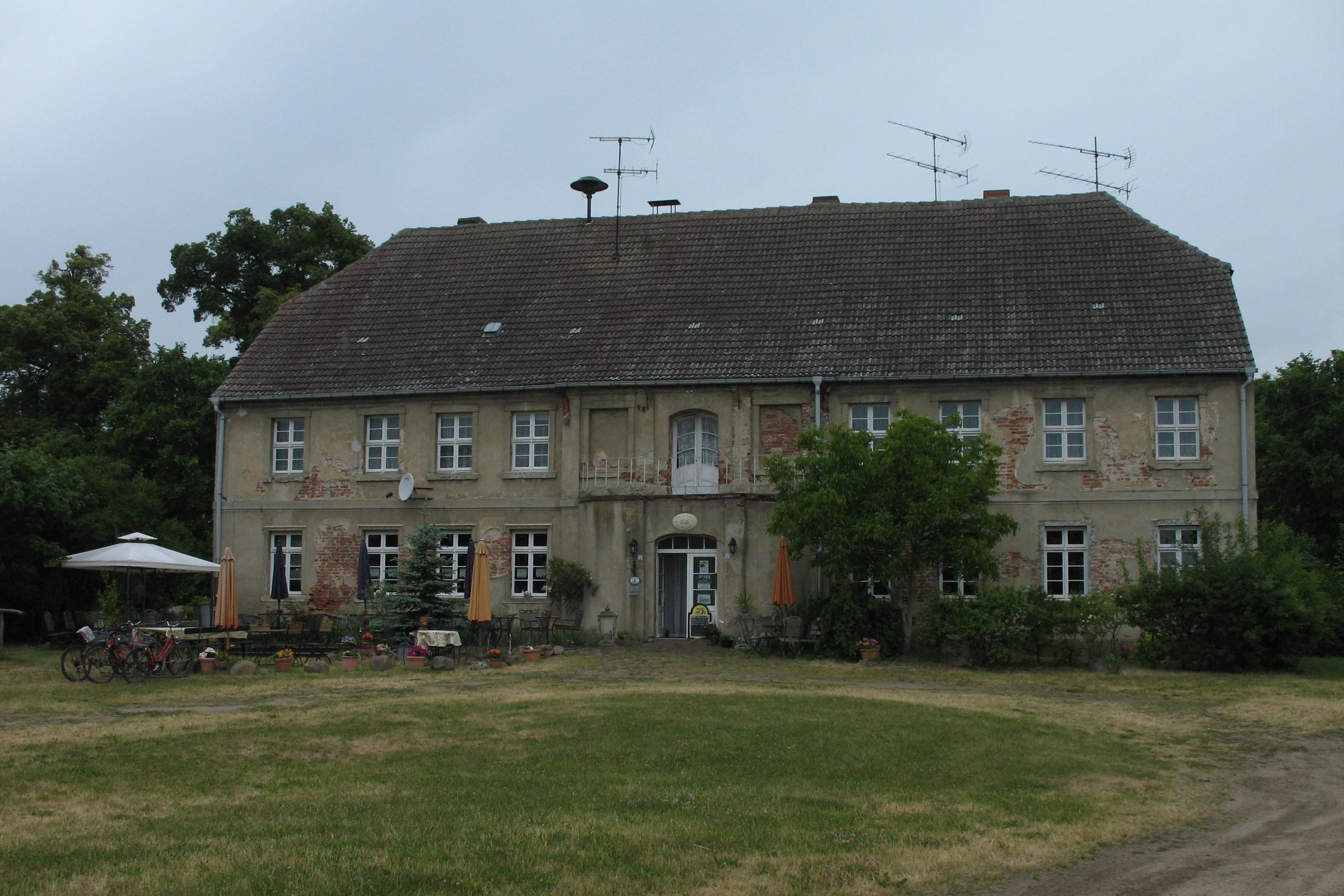
Manor in Friedenfelde

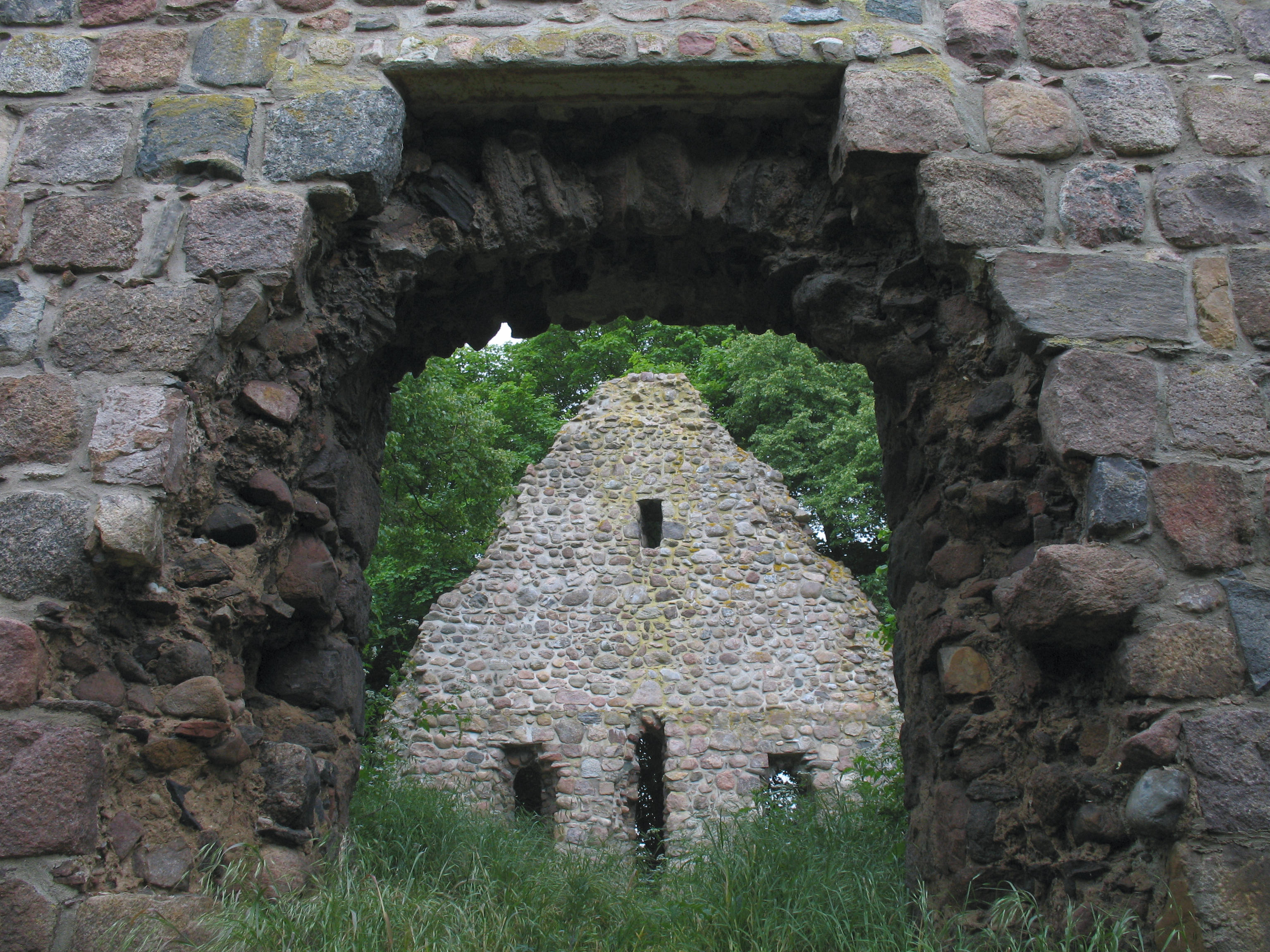
Church ruin in Berkenlatten

Gerswalde is a municipality in the Uckermark district, in Brandenburg, Germany.

== Demography ==
Development of Population since 1875 within the Current Boundaries (Blue Line: Population; Dotted Line: Comparison to Population Development of Brandenburg state; Grey Background: Time of Nazi rule; Red Background: Time of Communist rule)

Gerswalde: Population development
within the current boundaries (2017)

Year	Pop.	±% p.a.
1875	3,301	—
1890	3,016	−0.60%
1910	2,822	−0.33%
1925	3,075	+0.57%
1933	3,159	+0.34%
1939	3,059	−0.53%
1946	4,441	+5.47%
1950	4,259	−1.04%
1964	3,080	−2.29%
1971	3,021	−0.28%
1981	2,412	−2.23%
1985	2,365	−0.49%
1989	2,266	−1.06%
1990	2,216	−2.21%

Year	Pop.	±% p.a.
1991	2,151	−2.93%
1992	2,090	−2.84%
1993	2,052	−1.82%
1994	2,049	−0.15%
1995	2,018	−1.51%
1996	1,999	−0.94%
1997	1,980	−0.95%
1998	1,974	−0.30%
1999	1,977	+0.15%
2000	1,974	−0.15%
2001	1,956	−0.91%
2002	1,924	−1.64%
2003	1,889	−1.82%
2004	1,844	−2.38%

Year	Pop.	±% p.a.
2005	1,815	−1.57%
2006	1,763	−2.87%
2007	1,723	−2.27%
2008	1,723	+0.00%
2009	1,680	−2.50%
2010	1,672	−0.48%
2011	1,656	−0.96%
2012	1,637	−1.15%
2013	1,612	−1.53%
2014	1,611	−0.06%
2015	1,604	−0.43%
2016	1,592	−0.75%
2017	1,568	−1.51%
