= Uckermark (district) =

Coordinates: 53°15′N 13°52′E

- District
- Flag Coat of arms
- Country: Germany
- State: Brandenburg
- Capital: Prenzlau

Government
  - District admin.: Karina Dörk (CDU)

Area
  - Total: 3,058.2 km^{2} (1,180.8 sq mi)

Population (31 December 2025)
  - Total: 116,422
  - Density: 38.069/km^{2} (98.598/sq mi)
- Time zone: UTC+01:00 (CET)
  - Summer (DST): UTC+02:00 (CEST)
- Vehicle registration: UM, ANG, PZ, SDT, TP
- Website: www.uckermark.de

Uckermark (German pronunciation) is a Kreis (district) in the northeastern part of Brandenburg, Germany. Neighbouring districts are (clockwise from the south) Barnim and Oberhavel, the districts Mecklenburgische Seenplatte and Vorpommern-Greifswald in Mecklenburg-Vorpommern, and to the east Poland (Police County and Gryfino County). It is one of the largest districts of Germany areawise. The district is named after the historical region of Uckermark.

== Geography ==
The Uckermark is named after the Uecker river. The Oder River, forming the Polish border, bounds the district in the east. The district is characterised by 600 lakes and 2,800 km of rivers. Rare animals still live in the lakeland, such as ospreys, beavers and otters.

The western parts of the Lower Oder Valley National Park are located in the district.

== History ==
The Uckermark was originally divided between the administrative units Uckerkreis and Stolpirischer Kreis. In 1817 as part of the Province of Brandenburg, a third district was created in the area, the district Angermünde, and the other two districts were renamed to Prenzlau and Templin. The current district Uckermark was created in 1993 by merging the previous districts Angermünde, Prenzlau and Templin, as well as the previously district-free city Schwedt. The district encompasses a small part of historical Western Pomerania, namely the area of Amt Gartz (Oder), while on the other hand, a part of the historical Uckermark around Löcknitz is currently included in the Vorpommern-Greifswald District.

== Demography ==
Development of Population since 1875 within the Current Boundaries (Blue Line: Population; Dotted Line: Comparison to Population Development of Brandenburg state; Grey Background: Time of Nazi rule; Red Background: Time of Communist rule)

Recent Population Development and Projections (Population Development before Census 2011 (blue line); Recent Population Development according to the Census in Germany in 2011 (blue bordered line); Official projections for 2005-2030 (yellow line); for 2014-2030 (red line); for 2017-2030 (scarlet line)

Landkreis Uckermark: Population development
within the current boundaries (2025)

Year	Pop.	±% p.a.
1875	129,964	—
1890	128,385	−0.08%
1910	132,931	+0.17%
1925	140,942	+0.39%
1933	137,444	−0.31%
1939	140,502	+0.37%
1946	166,690	+2.47%
1950	174,223	+1.11%
1964	160,730	−0.57%
1971	172,776	+1.04%

Year	Pop.	±% p.a.
1981	175,927	+0.18%
1985	173,993	−0.28%
1990	170,409	−0.42%
1995	160,310	−1.21%
2000	151,740	−1.09%
2005	139,326	−1.69%
2010	129,738	−1.42%
2015	121,014	−1.38%
2020	118,250	−0.46%
2025	116,422	−0.31%

== Coat of arms ==
The main feature of the coat of arms are the brick buildings of the district — the churches of Prenzlau and Angermünde. The city wall below recalls the many wars of the Middle Ages. The two circular windows in the church tower symbolizes the division into two districts before the reform of 1817, the three Gothic windows represent this division. On the city wall are two shields — one with the griffin of Pomerania, the other with the red eagle of Brandenburg. The wavy lines in the upper part represent the main rivers in the district, Oder, Randow, and Uecker. The yellow color of the background represents the agriculture of the district, as the Uckermark was the "granary" of Brandenburg. The coat of arms was created by Hans Benthin, and was officially granted on November 8, 1995.

== Towns and municipalities ==
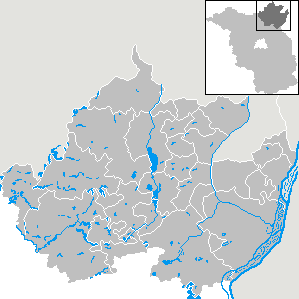
Clickable map of towns and municipalities in the district

Amt-free towns	Ämter
1. Angermünde; 2. Lychen; 3. Prenzlau; 4. Schwedt; 5. Templin; Amt-free municipalities: 1. Boitzenburger Land; 2. Nordwestuckermark; 3. Pinnow; 4. Uckerland	1. Brüssow (Uckermark); 1. Brüssow^{1, 2}; 2. Carmzow-Wallmow; 3. Göritz; 4. Schenkenberg; 5. Schönfeld; 2. Gartz (Oder); 1. Casekow; 2. Gartz^{1, 2}; 3. Hohenselchow-Groß Pinnow; 4. Mescherin; 5. Tantow	3. Gerswalde; 1. Flieth-Stegelitz; 2. Gerswalde^{1}; 3. Milmersdorf; 4. Mittenwalde; 5. Temmen-Ringenwalde; 4. Gramzow; 1. Gramzow^{1}; 2. Grünow; 3. Oberuckersee; 4. Randowtal; 5. Uckerfelde; 6. Zichow
^{1}seat of the Amt; ^{2}town
