= Zichow =

- Municipality
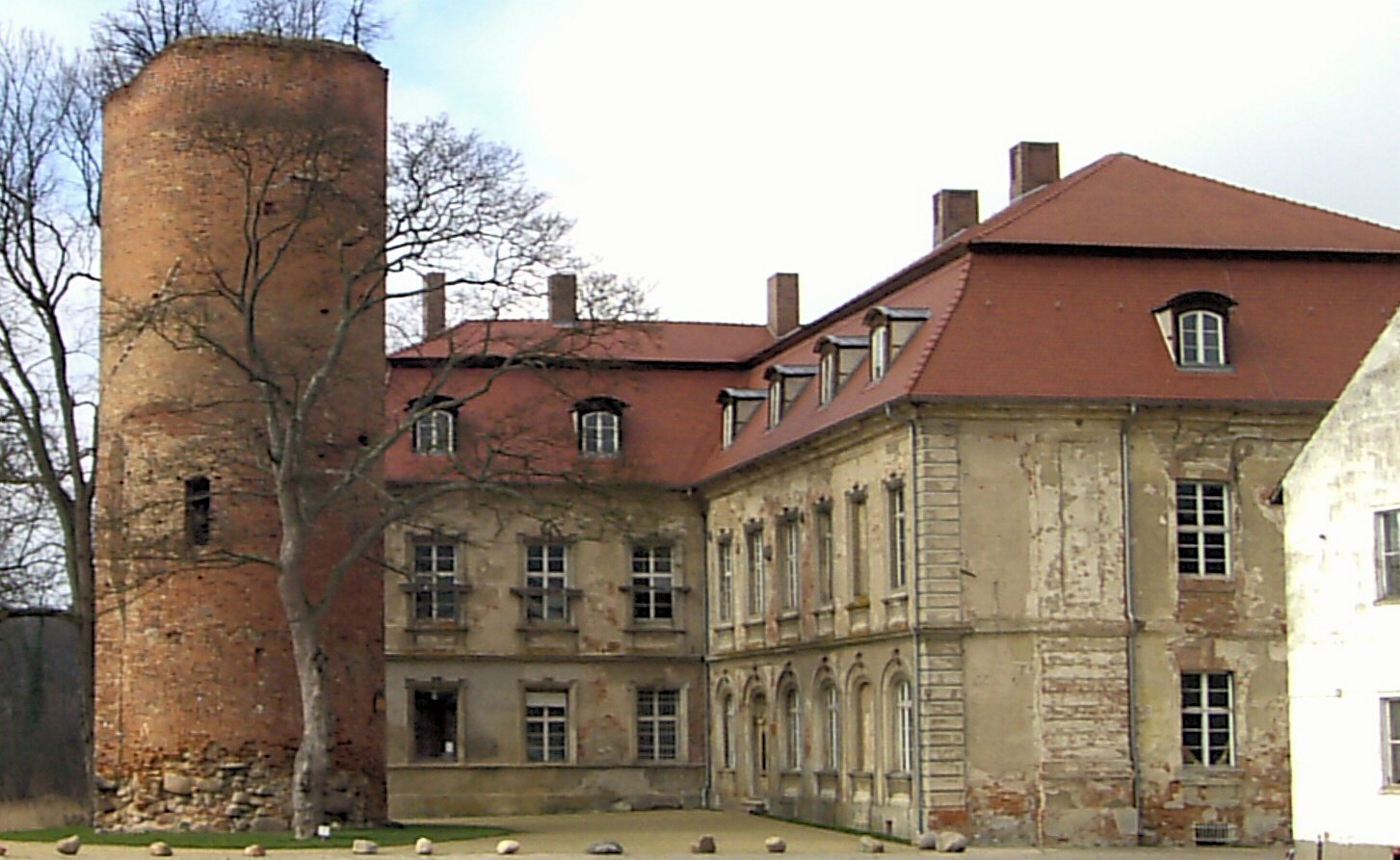
- Zichow Castle with medieval keep

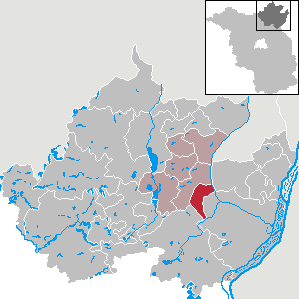
- Location of Zichow within Uckermark district
- Interactive map of Zichow
- Location within Germany Location within Brandenburg
- Coordinates: 53°11′00″N 14°02′00″E
- Country: Germany
- State: Brandenburg
- District: Uckermark
- Municipal assoc.: Gramzow

Government
  - Mayor (2024–29): Mathias Bürger

Area
  - Total: 32.15 km^{2} (12.41 sq mi)
- Elevation: 65 m (213 ft)

Population (2025-12-31)
  - Total: 470
  - Density: 15/km^{2} (38/sq mi)
- Time zone: UTC+01:00 (CET)
  - Summer (DST): UTC+02:00 (CEST)
- Postal codes: 16306
- Dialling codes: 039861
- Vehicle registration: UM
- Website: www.amtgramzow.de

Zichow is a municipality in the Uckermark district, in Brandenburg, Germany. It is part of the Amt ("collective municipality") Gramzow.

== Geography ==
Zichow is located within the historic Uckermark region. The municipal area comprises Zichow proper and the civil parishes (Ortsteile) of Fredersdorf and Golm, incorporated in 2001.

== History ==
The former Slavic settlement of Zichow in the Margraviate of Brandenburg was first mentioned in a 1288 deed, issued by the Premonstratensian monks of nearby Gramzow Abbey. A fortress was erected at the site during the 13th century German Ostsiedlung migration. In 1354 Elector Louis II of Brandenburg ceded Zichow and Golm to the bordering Duchy of Pomerania.

Re-acquired by Elector Frederick II in 1447, the estates were enfeoffed to several Brandenburgian noble dynasties. All three parishes suffered from extended devastations during the Thirty Years' War. Zichow Castle was rebuilt in a Baroque style after a blaze in 1745.

== Demography ==
Development of population since 1875 within the current boundaries (Blue line: Population; Dotted line: Comparison to population development of Brandenburg state; Grey background: Time of Nazi rule; Red background: Time of communist rule)

Zichow: Population development
within the current boundaries (2017)

Year	Pop.	±% p.a.
1875	1,038	—
1890	917	−0.82%
1910	1,057	+0.71%
1925	1,152	+0.58%
1933	1,010	−1.63%
1939	980	−0.50%
1946	1,400	+5.23%
1950	1,476	+1.33%
1964	1,126	−1.91%
1971	1,078	−0.62%
1981	881	−2.00%
1985	796	−2.50%
1989	713	−2.72%
1990	702	−1.54%

Year	Pop.	±% p.a.
1991	704	+0.28%
1992	668	−5.11%
1993	651	−2.54%
1994	648	−0.46%
1995	647	−0.15%
1996	641	−0.93%
1997	655	+2.18%
1998	656	+0.15%
1999	676	+3.05%
2000	662	−2.07%
2001	664	+0.30%
2002	657	−1.05%
2003	644	−1.98%
2004	645	+0.16%

Year	Pop.	±% p.a.
2005	641	−0.62%
2006	644	+0.47%
2007	625	−2.95%
2008	645	+3.20%
2009	611	−5.27%
2010	617	+0.98%
2011	628	+1.78%
2012	632	+0.64%
2013	610	−3.48%
2014	609	−0.16%
2015	583	−4.27%
2016	566	−2.92%
2017	565	−0.18%

== Notable people ==
- Carl Strehlow (1871–1922), missionary and ethnologist
