= Nesselpfuhl =

Lake in Brandenburg, Germany

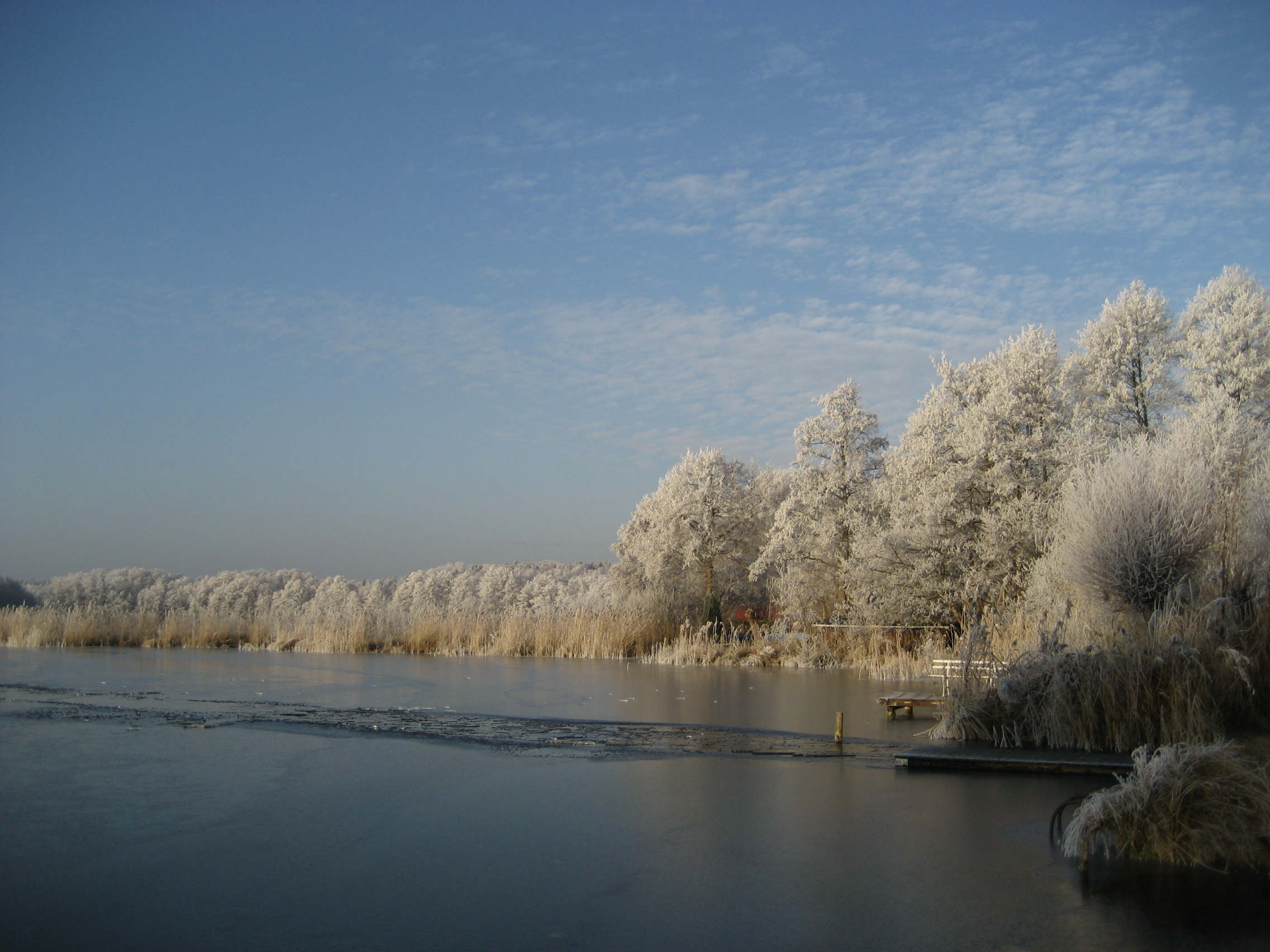
- Nettle pond in winter

- Location within Brandenburg
- Location: Uckermark, Brandenburg
- Coordinates: 53°12.80928′N 13°18.54012′E
- Basin countries: Germany
- Surface area: 21.40 ha (52.9 acres)
- Max. depth: 6 m (20 ft)
- Settlements: Lychen

Nesselpfuhl is a lake in Uckermark, Brandenburg, Germany. Its surface area is 0.2140 km^{2}. It is located in the town of Lychen.

== See also ==
- Oberpfuhl
- Wurlsee
- Zenssee
