= Grünow, Brandenburg =

- Municipality
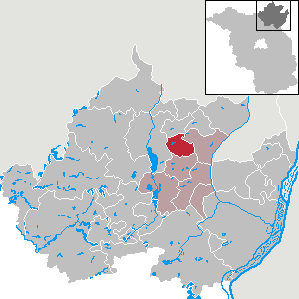
- Location of Grünow, Brandenburg within Uckermark district
- Interactive map of Grünow, Brandenburg
- Location within Germany Location within Brandenburg
- Coordinates: 53°19′00″N 13°56′42″E
- Country: Germany
- State: Brandenburg
- District: Uckermark
- Municipal assoc.: Gramzow

Government
  - Mayor (2024–29): André Cunow

Area
  - Total: 34.88 km^{2} (13.47 sq mi)
- Elevation: 63 m (207 ft)

Population (2025-12-31)
  - Total: 953
  - Density: 27.3/km^{2} (70.8/sq mi)
- Time zone: UTC+01:00 (CET)
  - Summer (DST): UTC+02:00 (CEST)
- Postal codes: 17291
- Dialling codes: 039857
- Vehicle registration: UM
- Website: www.amtgramzow.de

Grünow is a municipality in the Uckermark district, in Brandenburg, Germany.

== Demography ==
Development of Population since 1875 within the Current Boundaries (Blue Line: Population; Dotted Line: Comparison to Population Development of Brandenburg state; Grey Background: Time of Nazi rule; Red Background: Time of Communist rule)

Grünow [Uckermark]: Population development
within the current boundaries (2017)

Year	Pop.	±% p.a.
1875	867	—
1890	918	+0.38%
1910	973	+0.29%
1925	1,108	+0.87%
1933	1,117	+0.10%
1939	1,069	−0.73%
1946	1,688	+6.74%
1950	1,714	+0.38%
1964	1,286	−2.03%
1971	1,273	−0.15%
1981	1,054	−1.87%
1985	1,005	−1.18%
1989	942	−1.61%
1990	911	−3.29%

Year	Pop.	±% p.a.
1991	885	−2.85%
1992	865	−2.26%
1993	875	+1.16%
1994	921	+5.26%
1995	927	+0.65%
1996	952	+2.70%
1997	959	+0.74%
1998	983	+2.50%
1999	1,008	+2.54%
2000	1,017	+0.89%
2001	1,032	+1.47%
2002	1,025	−0.68%
2003	1,031	+0.59%
2004	1,021	−0.97%

Year	Pop.	±% p.a.
2005	990	−3.04%
2006	982	−0.81%
2007	977	−0.51%
2008	957	−2.05%
2009	957	+0.00%
2010	923	−3.55%
2011	929	+0.65%
2012	923	−0.65%
2013	915	−0.87%
2014	951	+3.93%
2015	941	−1.05%
2016	926	−1.59%
2017	945	+2.05%
