= Lychen =

- Town
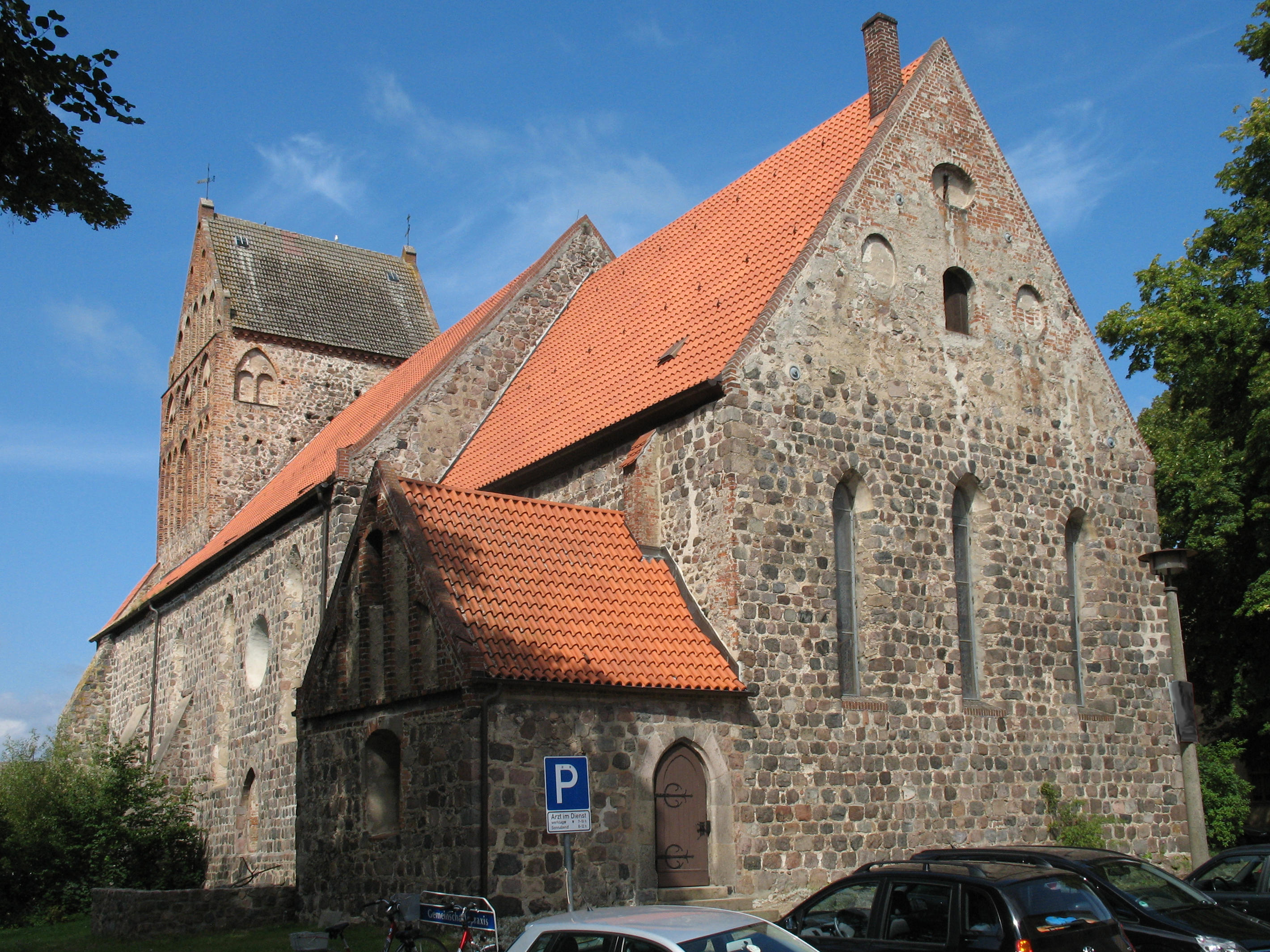
- Church of Saint John

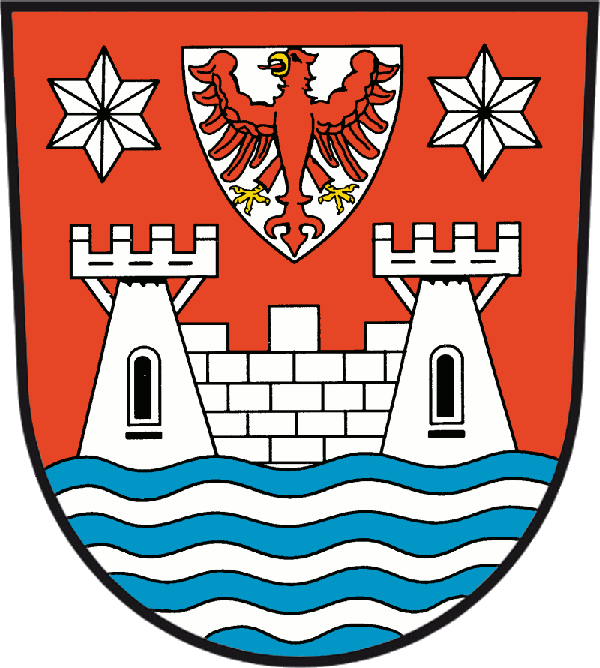
- Coat of arms

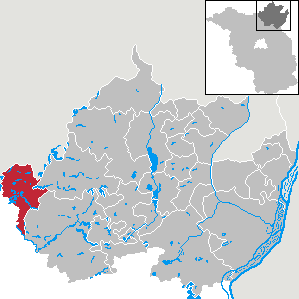
- Location of Lychen within Uckermark district
- Interactive map of Lychen
- Location within Germany Location within Brandenburg
- Coordinates: 53°12′12″N 13°19′11″E
- Country: Germany
- State: Brandenburg
- District: Uckermark
- Subdivisions: 4 Ortsteile

Government
  - Mayor (2024–32): Karola Gundlach

Area
  - Total: 111.99 km^{2} (43.24 sq mi)
- Elevation: 60 m (200 ft)

Population (2025-12-31)
  - Total: 3,147
  - Density: 28.10/km^{2} (72.78/sq mi)
- Time zone: UTC+01:00 (CET)
  - Summer (DST): UTC+02:00 (CEST)
- Postal codes: 17279
- Dialling codes: 039888
- Vehicle registration: UM
- Website: www.lychen.de

Lychen (German pronunciation: [ˈlyːçn̩]), also known as Flößerstadt (raftsman city), is a town in the Uckermark district, in Brandenburg, Germany. It is situated 24 kilometres (15 mi) southeast of Neustrelitz, and 12 kilometres (7.5 mi) east of Fürstenberg/Havel. This is the town where the thumbtack was created.

== History ==
Historically, timber rafting was one of the most important sectors of the economy. The timber was built into rafts and used for building projects, and was also used to transport other goods. Lychen has a timber rafting museum, and tourists can travel by raft on the lake.

Flat-headed thumbtacks were invented in Lychen in 1903 by Johann Kirsten. His invention is celebrated in a memorial. At the beginning of the 20th century there were a number of small factories here manufacturing thumbtacks.

The Hohenlychen Sanatorium used by the Schutzstaffel during World War II, is located in the town.

== Demography ==
Development of population since 1875 within the current Boundaries (Blue Line: Population; Dotted Line: Comparison to Population development in Brandenburg state; Grey Background: Time of Nazi Germany; Red Background: Time of communist East Germany)

Recent Population Development and Projections (Population Development before Census 2011 (blue line); Recent Population Development according to the Census in Germany in 2011 (blue bordered line); Official projections for 2005-2030 (yellow line); for 2017-2030 (scarlet line); for 2020-2030 (green line)

Lychen: Population development
within the current boundaries (2020)

Year	Pop.	±% p.a.
1875	3,184	—
1890	3,359	+0.36%
1910	3,919	+0.77%
1925	4,828	+1.40%
1939	5,261	+0.62%
1950	5,053	−0.37%
1964	4,452	−0.90%

Year	Pop.	±% p.a.
1971	4,490	+0.12%
1981	4,205	−0.65%
1985	4,209	+0.02%
1990	4,114	−0.46%
1995	4,122	+0.04%
2000	3,966	−0.77%
2005	3,905	−0.31%

Year	Pop.	±% p.a.
2010	3,527	−2.02%
2015	3,135	−2.33%
2016	3,222	+2.78%
2017	3,207	−0.47%
2018	3,178	−0.90%
2019	3,178	+0.00%
2020	3,154	−0.76%

== Gallery ==
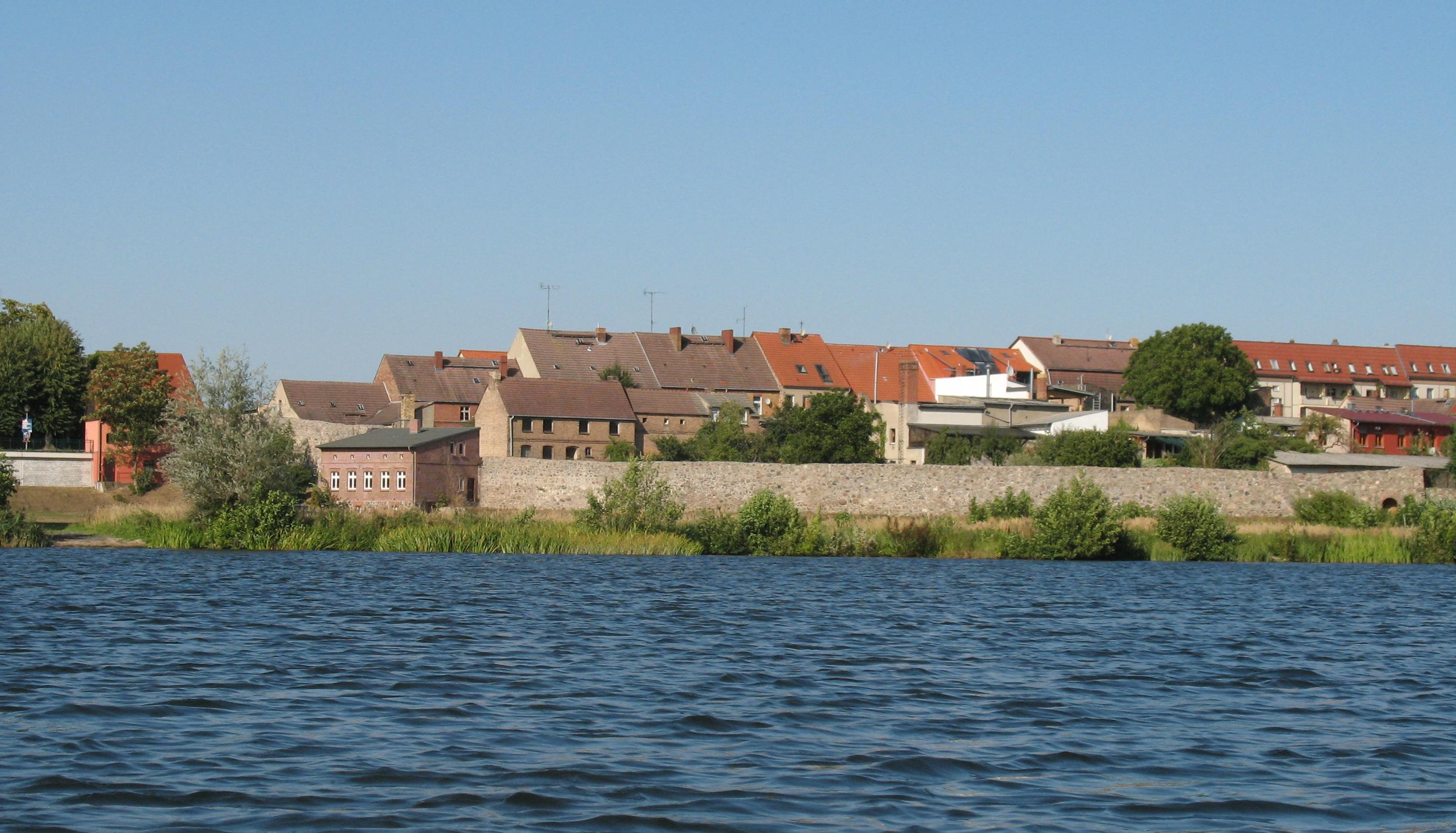
City wall

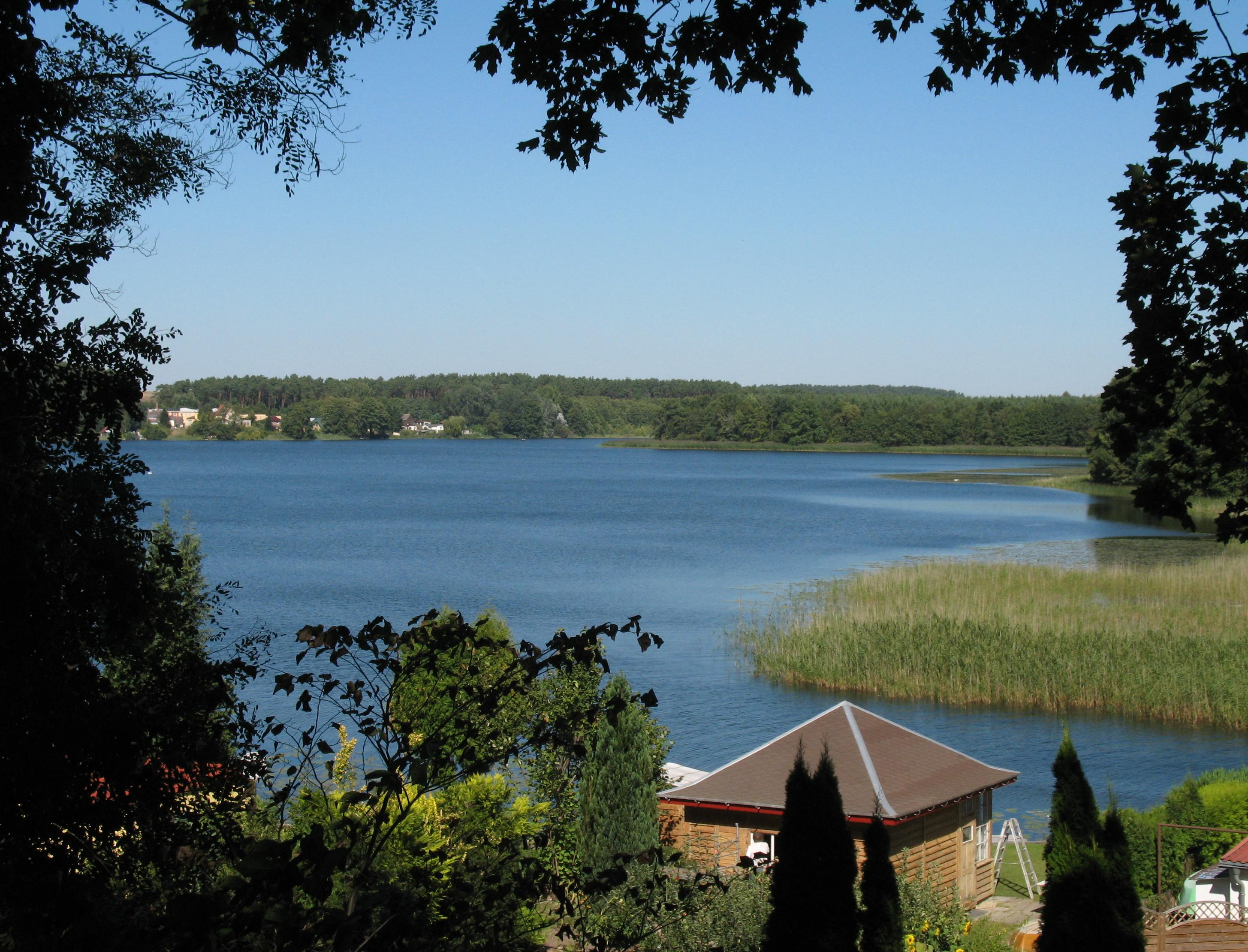
Lake Oberpfuhl

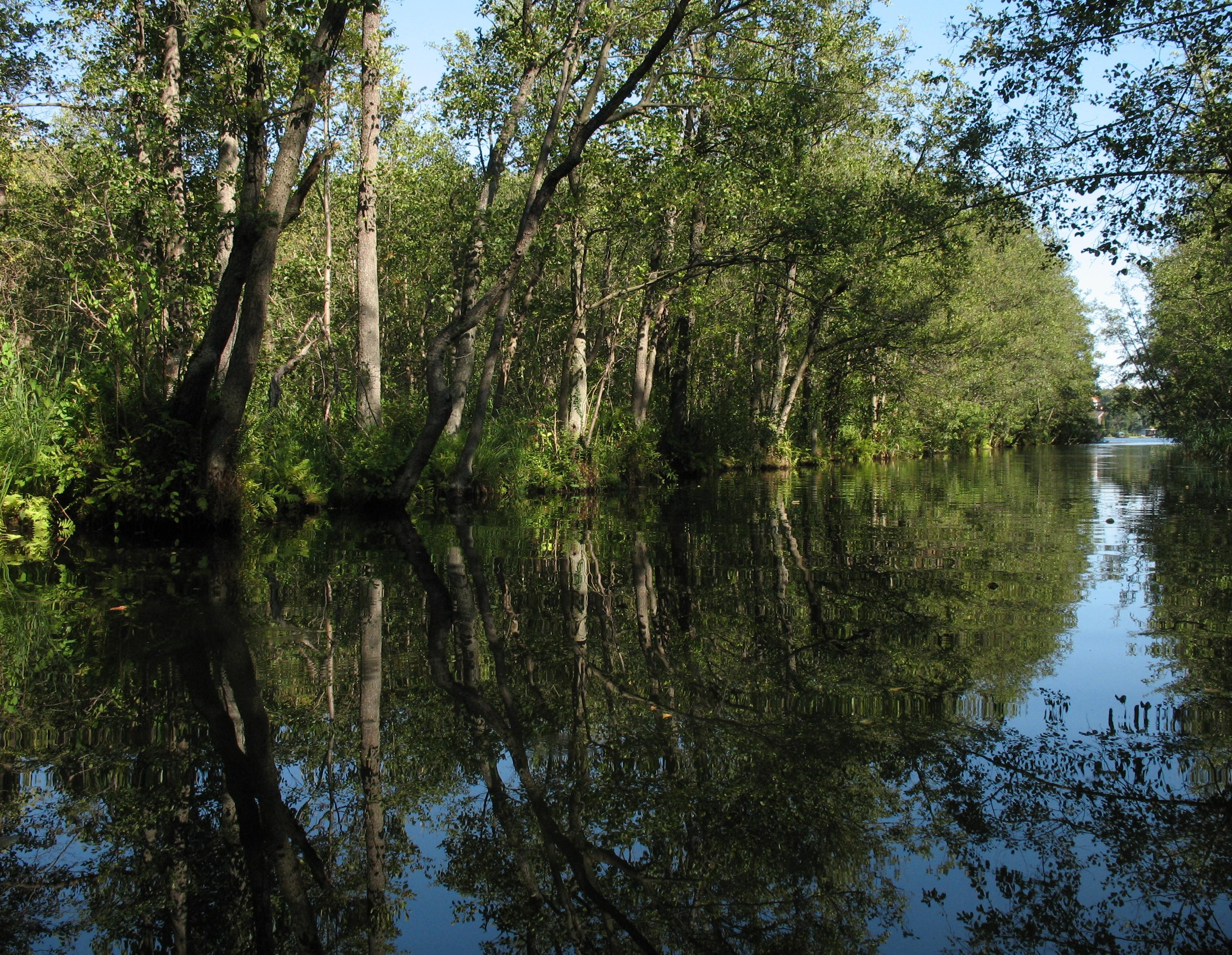
Stream Wurlflut

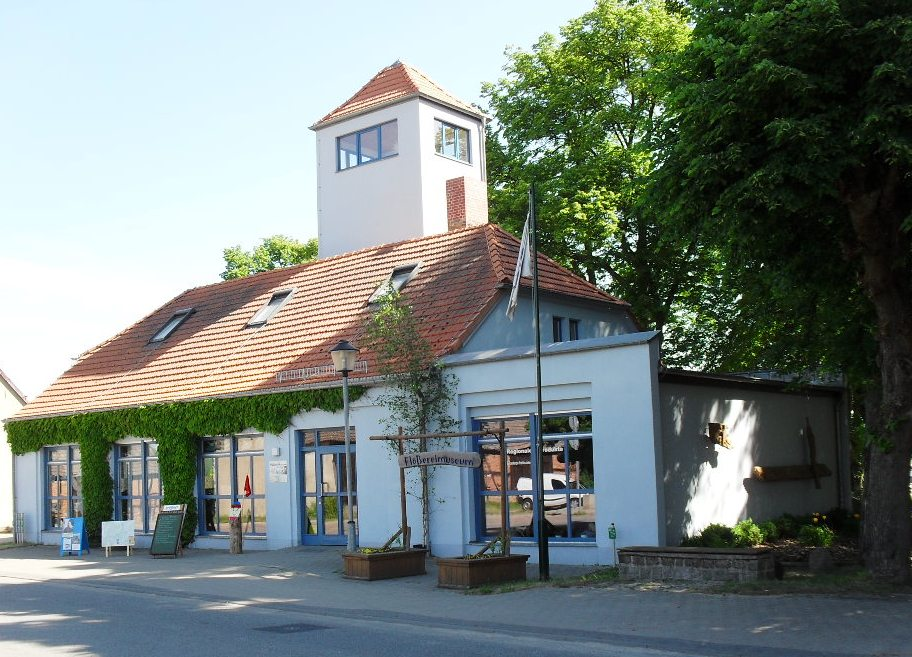
Timber Rafting Museum

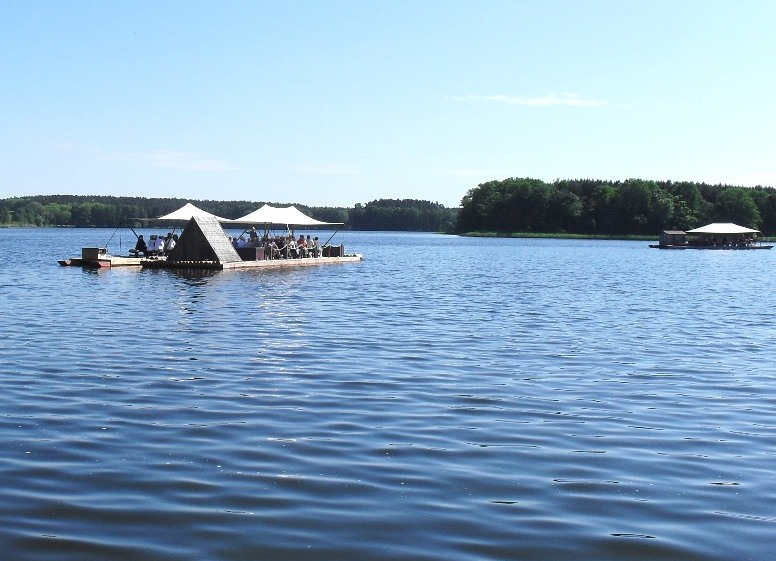
Raft carrying tourists to lake Oberpfuhl

== See also ==
- Nesselpfuhl
- Oberpfuhl
- Wurlsee
- Zenssee
