= Oberpfuhl =

Lake in Brandenburg, Germany

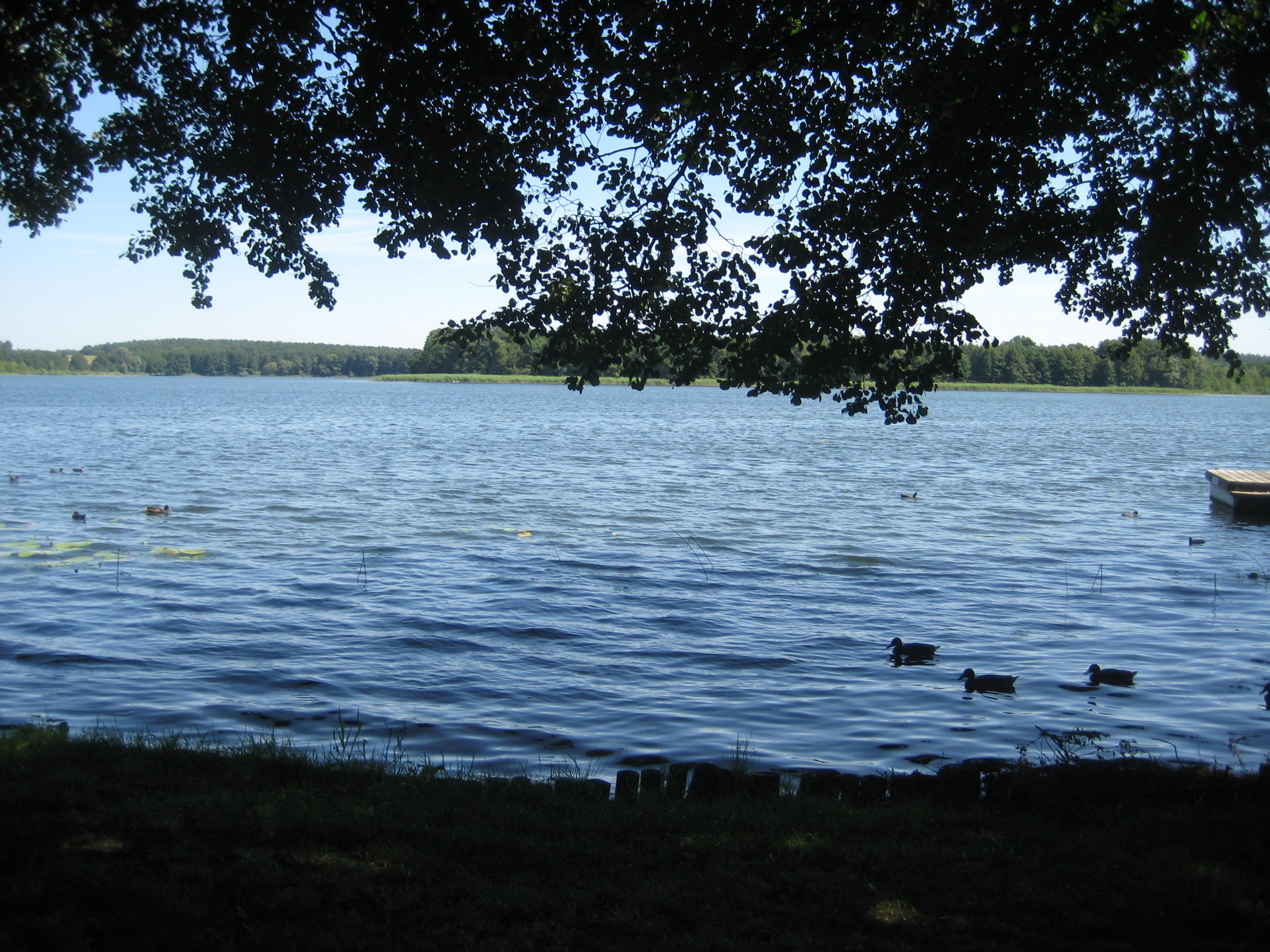

- Location within Brandenburg
- Location: Uckermark, Brandenburg
- Coordinates: 53°12′55″N 13°19′15″E
- Basin countries: Germany
- Surface area: 65 ha (160 acres)
- Average depth: 8 m (26 ft)
- Max. depth: 8 m (26 ft)
- Settlements: Lychen

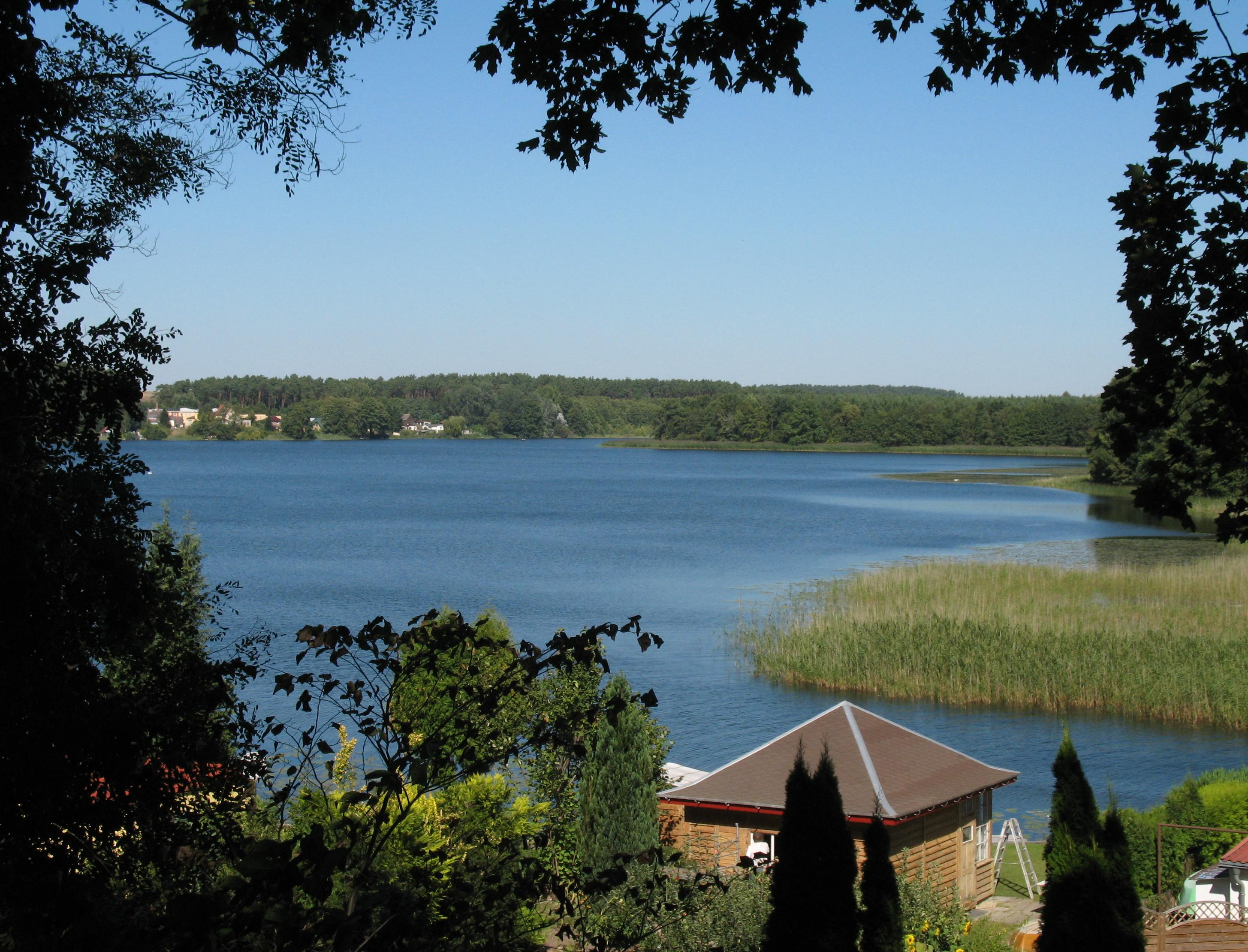
Oberpfuhl

Oberpfuhl is a lake in Uckermark, Brandenburg, Germany. Its surface area is 65 hectares and it's 8m deep. It is located in the town of Lychen.

== Name ==
The name of the lake comes from the Middle Low German "boven" (or bāven regionally) meaning "above", which became "ober" in High German. The lake was previously called Bavenpfuhl, with historical forms including Babenpfuel (1556), bouen Puel (1574), Baffen Phuhl (1560), Baven See (1719) and Bavenpohl (1751).

== Nature ==
Oberpfuhl is a natural lake and its eastern shore is part of the Oberpfuhlmoor nature reserve, a marshy wetland habitat. The main fish species present in the lake are pike, zander, perch, carp, tench, and many whitefish species.

== See also ==
- Nesselpfuhl
- Wurlsee
- Zenssee
