= Wurlsee =

Lake in Brandenburg, Germany

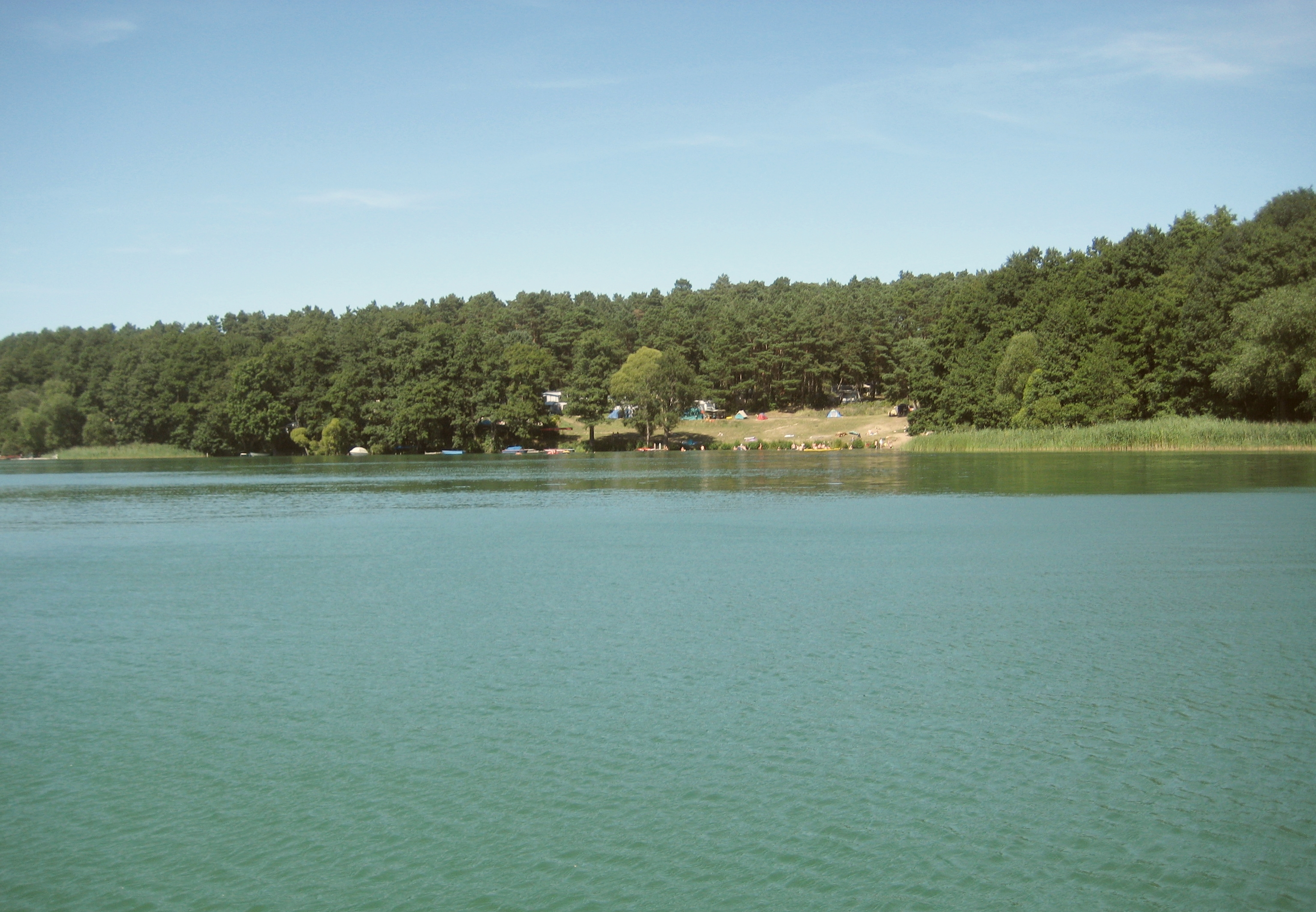

- Location within Brandenburg
- Location: Uckermark, Brandenburg
- Coordinates: 53.2213°N 13.2936°E
- Basin countries: Germany
- Surface area: 1.6395 km^{2} (0.6330 sq mi)
- Average depth: 26 m (85 ft)
- Max. depth: 28 m (92 ft)
- Settlements: Lychen

Wurlsee is a lake in Uckermark, Brandenburg, Germany. Its surface area is 1.6395 km². It is located in the town of Lychen.

== See also ==
- Nesselpfuhl
- Oberpfuhl
- Zenssee
