= Zenssee =

Lake in Brandenburg, Germany

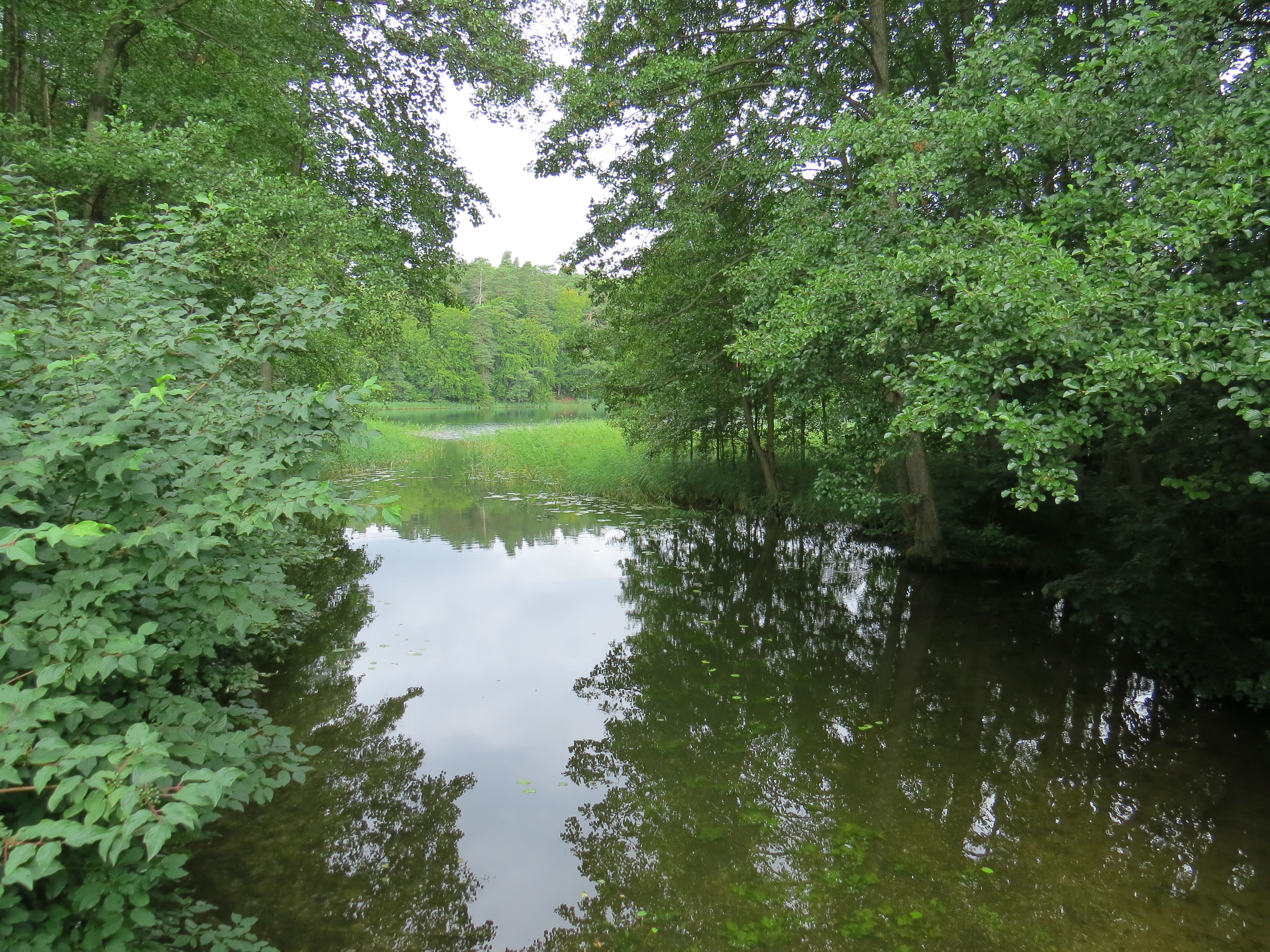
- Lychen, Zenssee

- Location within Germany
- Location: Uckermark, Brandenburg
- Coordinates: 53°11′49″N 13°20′28″E
- Basin countries: Germany
- Surface area: 1.1167 km^{2} (0.4312 sq mi)
- Max. depth: 29 m (95 ft)
- Settlements: Lychen

Zenssee is a lake in Uckermark, Brandenburg, Germany. At an elevation of, its surface area is 1.1167 km^{2}. It is located in the town of Lychen.

== See also ==
- Nesselpfuhl
- Oberpfuhl
- Wurlsee
