= Uckerfelde =

- Municipality
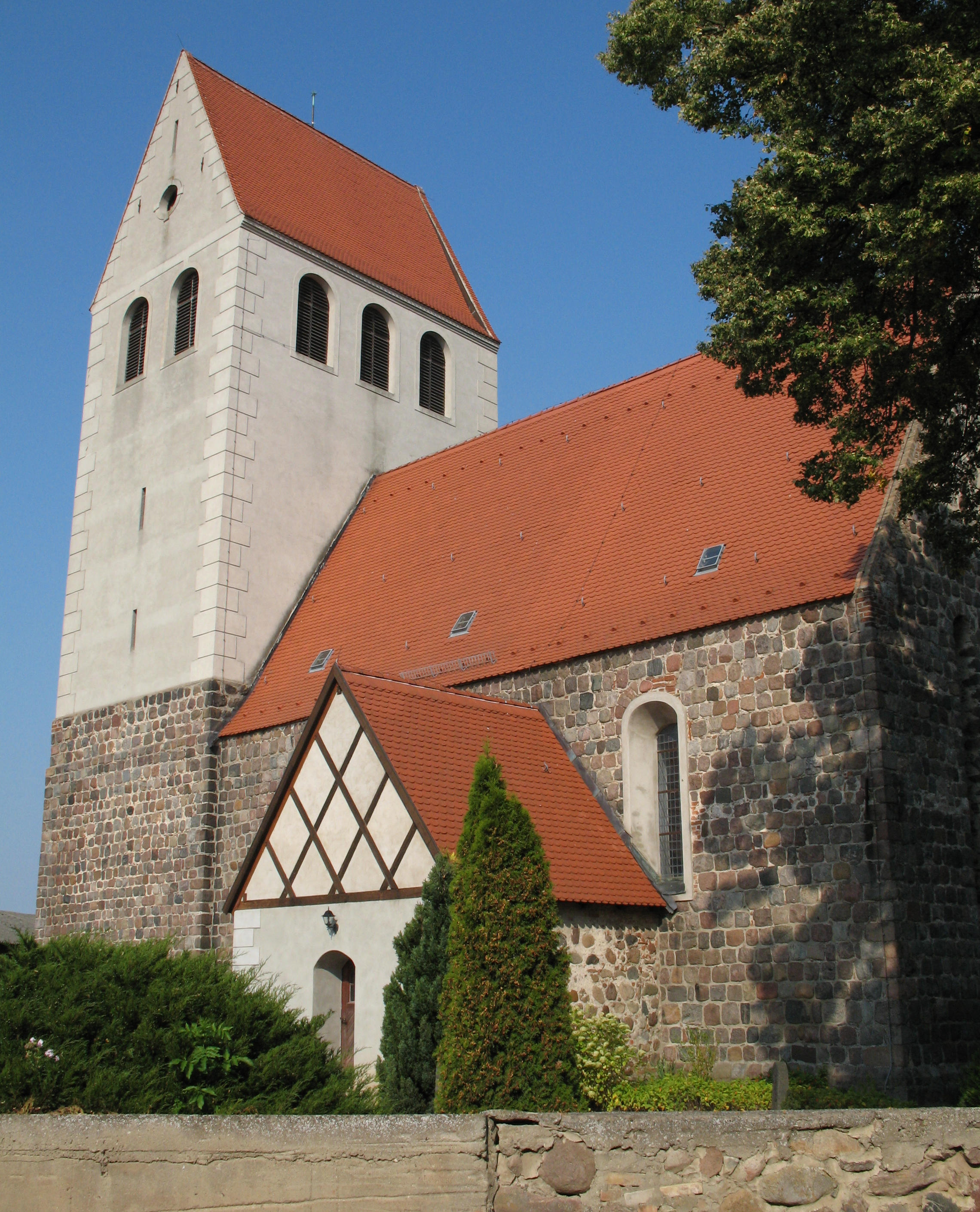
- Church in Bietikow

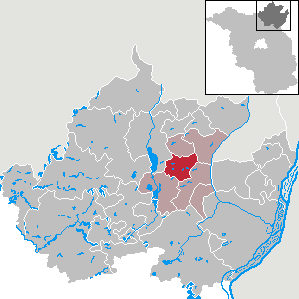
- Location of Uckerfelde within Uckermark district
- Interactive map of Uckerfelde
- Location within Germany Location within Brandenburg
- Coordinates: 53°15′54″N 13°57′00″E
- Country: Germany
- State: Brandenburg
- District: Uckermark
- Municipal assoc.: Gramzow

Government
  - Mayor (2024–29): Peter Gerhardt

Area
  - Total: 46.27 km^{2} (17.86 sq mi)
- Elevation: 78 m (256 ft)

Population (2025-12-31)
  - Total: 947
  - Density: 20.5/km^{2} (53.0/sq mi)
- Time zone: UTC+01:00 (CET)
  - Summer (DST): UTC+02:00 (CEST)
- Postal codes: 17291
- Dialling codes: 039858, 039861
- Vehicle registration: UM
- Website: www.amtgramzow.de

Uckerfelde (German pronunciation: [ʊkɐˈfɛldə]) is a municipality in the Uckermark district of Brandenburg, Germany.

== Demography ==
Development of population since 1875 within the current boundaries (Blue line: Population; Dotted line: Comparison to population development of Brandenburg state; Grey background: Time of Nazi rule; Red background: Time of communist rule)

Uckerfelde: Population development
within the current boundaries (2017)

Year	Pop.	±% p.a.
1875	1,646	—
1890	1,646	+0.00%
1910	1,647	+0.00%
1925	1,756	+0.43%
1933	1,594	−1.20%
1939	1,655	+0.63%
1946	2,493	+6.03%
1950	2,631	+1.36%
1964	2,044	−1.79%
1971	1,938	−0.76%
1981	1,324	−3.74%
1985	1,242	−1.59%
1989	1,207	−0.71%
1990	1,191	−1.33%

Year	Pop.	±% p.a.
1991	1,178	−1.09%
1992	1,164	−1.19%
1993	1,166	+0.17%
1994	1,173	+0.60%
1995	1,173	+0.00%
1996	1,158	−1.28%
1997	1,157	−0.09%
1998	1,152	−0.43%
1999	1,153	+0.09%
2000	1,129	−2.08%
2001	1,126	−0.27%
2002	1,118	−0.71%
2003	1,085	−2.95%
2004	1,095	+0.92%

Year	Pop.	±% p.a.
2005	1,089	−0.55%
2006	1,087	−0.18%
2007	1,061	−2.39%
2008	1,054	−0.66%
2009	1,046	−0.76%
2010	1,053	+0.67%
2011	1,008	−4.27%
2012	997	−1.09%
2013	992	−0.50%
2014	953	−3.93%
2015	948	−0.52%
2016	943	−0.53%
2017	931	−1.27%
