= Gramzow (Amt) =

- Amt
- Map of Uckermark highlighting Gramzow
- Interactive map of Gramzow
- Location within Germany Location within Brandenburg
- Coordinates: 53°13′N 14°00′E
- Country: Germany
- State: Brandenburg
- District: Uckermark
- Seat: Gramzow
- Subdivisions: 6 municipalities

Area
  - Total: 328.76 km^{2} (126.93 sq mi)

Population (2025-12-31)
  - Total: 6,468
  - Density: 19.67/km^{2} (50.96/sq mi)
- Time zone: UTC+01:00 (CET)
  - Summer (DST): UTC+02:00 (CEST)
- Website: www.amt-gramzow.de

Amt Gramzow is an Amt ("collective municipality") in the district of Uckermark, in Brandenburg, Germany. Its seat is in Gramzow.

The Amt Gramzow consists of the following municipalities:

1. Gramzow
2. Grünow
3. Oberuckersee
4. Randowtal
5. Uckerfelde
6. Zichow

== Demography ==
Development of population since 1875 within the current Boundaries (Blue Line: Population; Dotted Line: Comparison to Population development in Brandenburg state; Grey Background: Time of Nazi Germany; Red Background: Time of communist East Germany)

Recent Population Development and Projections (Population Development before Census 2011 (blue line); Recent Population Development according to the Census in Germany in 2011 (blue bordered line); Official projections for 2005-2030 (yellow line); for 2017-2030 (scarlet line); for 2020-2030 (red line)

Amt Gramzow: Population development
within the current boundaries (2020)

Year	Pop.	±% p.a.
1875	12,231	—
1890	11,579	−0.36%
1910	11,868	+0.12%
1925	12,341	+0.26%
1939	11,101	−0.75%
1950	16,702	+3.78%
1964	12,774	−1.90%
1971	12,328	−0.51%
1981	9,601	−2.47%

Year	Pop.	±% p.a.
1985	9,127	−1.26%
1990	8,427	−1.58%
1995	8,117	−0.75%
2000	8,211	+0.23%
2005	7,847	−0.90%
2010	7,387	−1.20%
2015	7,003	−1.06%
2020	6,773	−0.67%
2025	6,468	−0.92%
