= Drawing pin =

Type of fastener

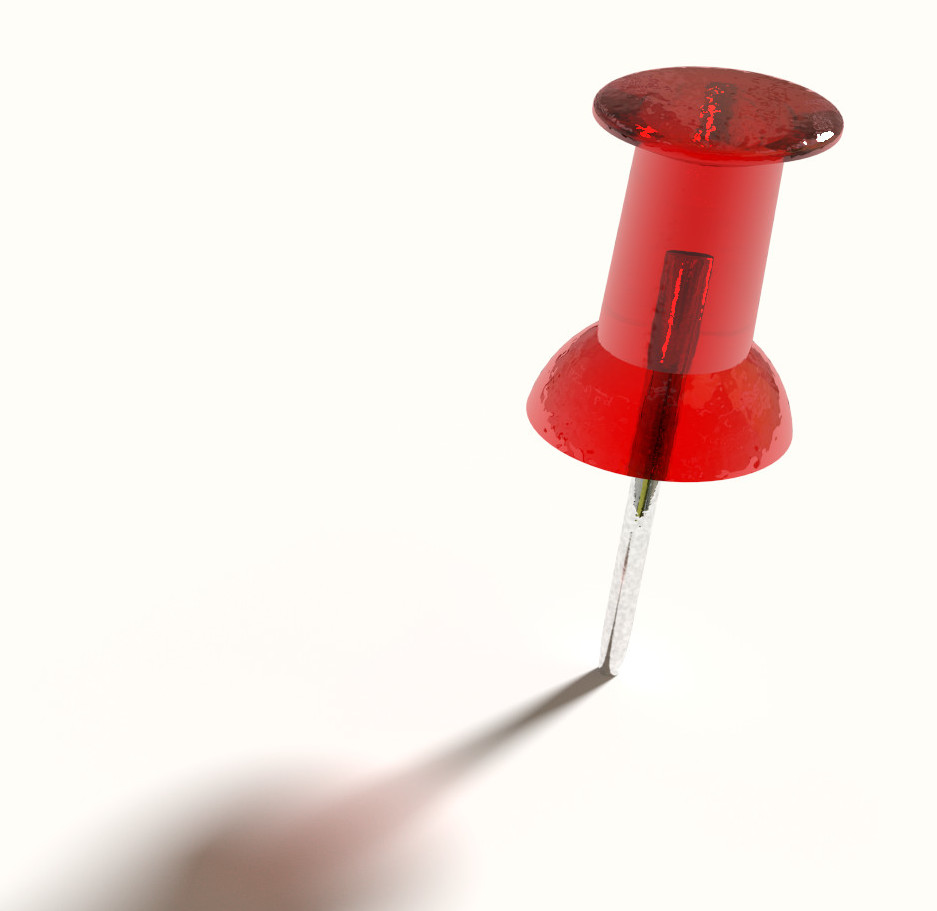
Push pin

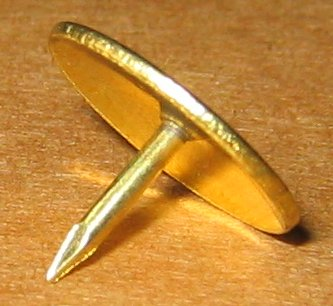
Drawing pin or thumb tack

A drawing pin (in British English) or thumb tack (in North American English), also called a push-pin, is a short, small pin or nail with a flat, broad head that can be pressed into place with pressure from the thumb, often used for hanging light articles on a wall or noticeboard.

Thumb tacks made of brass, tin or iron may be referred to as brass tacks, brass pins, tin tacks or iron tacks, respectively. These terms are particularly used in the idiomatic expression to come (or get) down to brass (or otherwise) tacks, meaning to consider basic facts of a situation.

== History ==
The drawing pin was invented in name and first mass-produced in what is now the United States in the mid/late 1750s; the earliest use of the term "drawing pin" is listed in the Oxford English Dictionary as 1812. It was said that the use of the newly invented drawing pin to attach notices to school house doors was making significant contribution to the whittling away of their gothic doors. Modern drawing pins were also found as standard in architects' drawing boxes in the late 18th century.

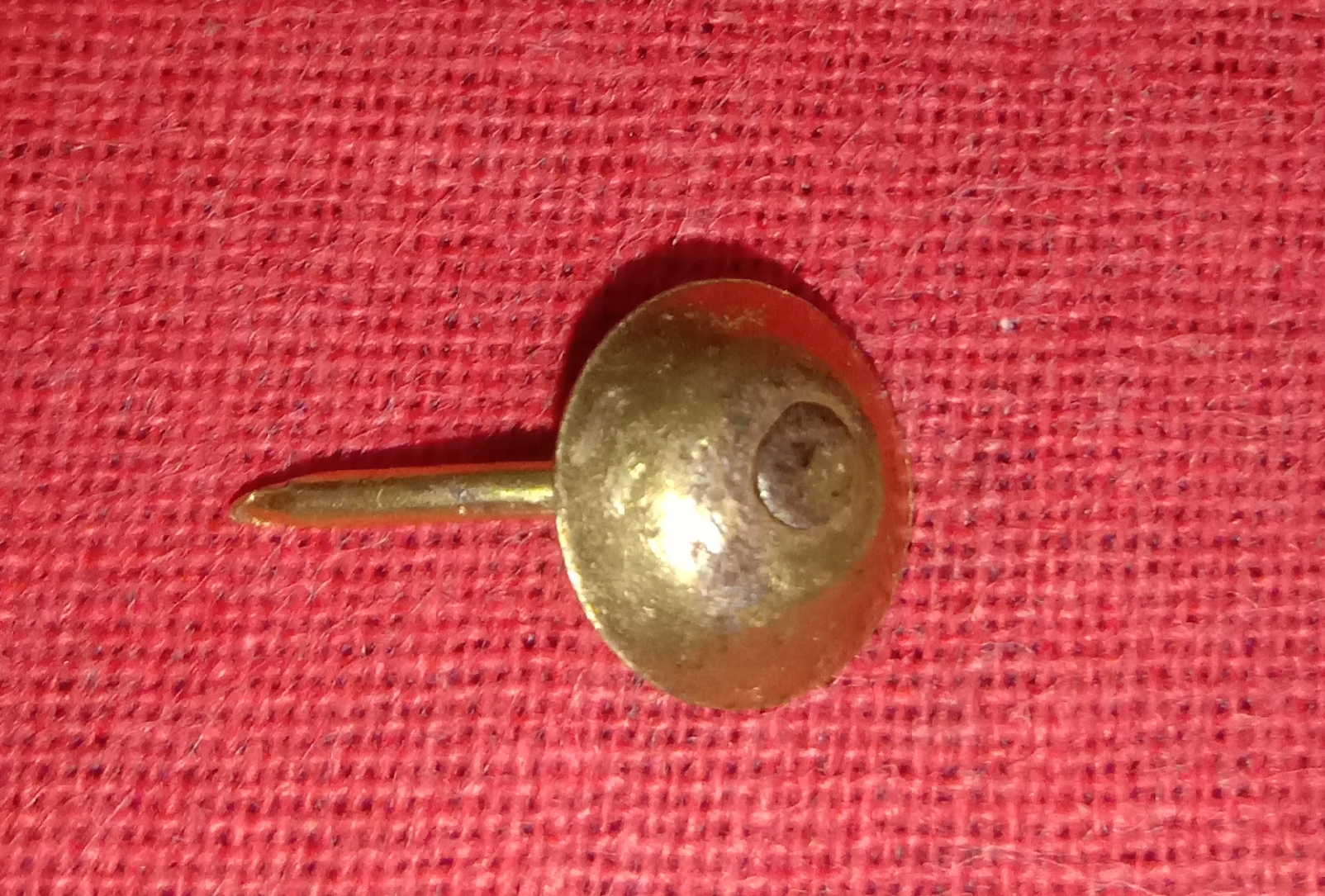
Drawing pin or thumb tack, made out of 14 carat gold.

Edwin Moore patented the "push-pin" in the US in 1900 and founded the Moore Push-Pin Company. Moore described them as a pin with a handle. In 1903, in the German town of Lychen, clockmaker Johann Kirsten invented flat-headed pins for use with drawings, although other sources credit Austrian factory owner Heinrich Sachs with inventing a pin pressed from a single disk of metal in 1888. This style of pin, with the pin formed by a cutout from the head, is still widely sold in Austria under the brand 'Sax'.

== Design ==
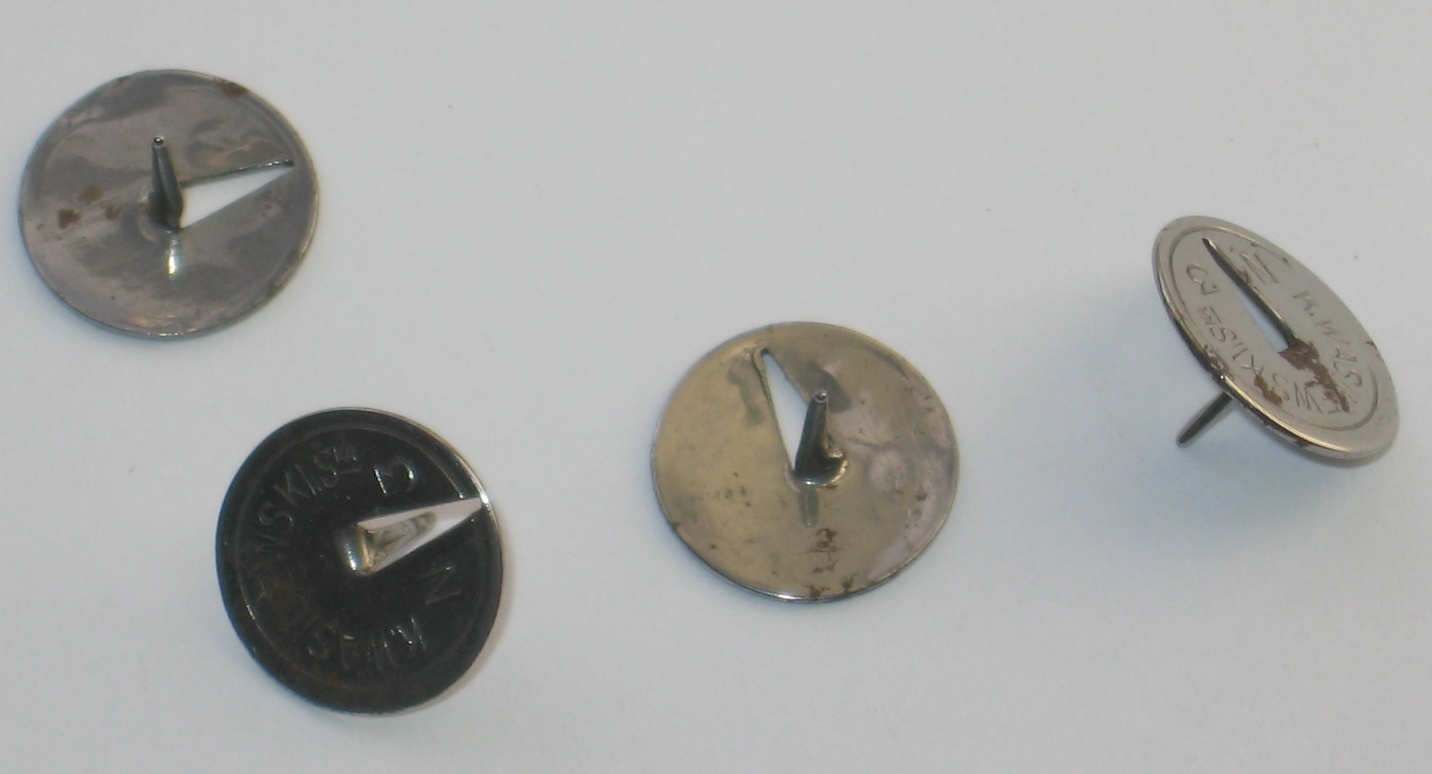
Design with pin formed from a cutout from the head

A drawing pin has two basic components: the head, often made of plastic, metal or wood, and the body, usually made of steel or brass. The head is wide to distribute the force of pushing the pin in, allowing only the hands to be used. Many head designs exist: flat, domed, spherical, cylindrical and a variety of novelty heads such as hearts or stars. Drawing pin heads also come in a variety of colours. These can be particularly useful to mark different locations on a map. Some drawing pin designs have a portion cut out of the head and bent downward to produce a pin.

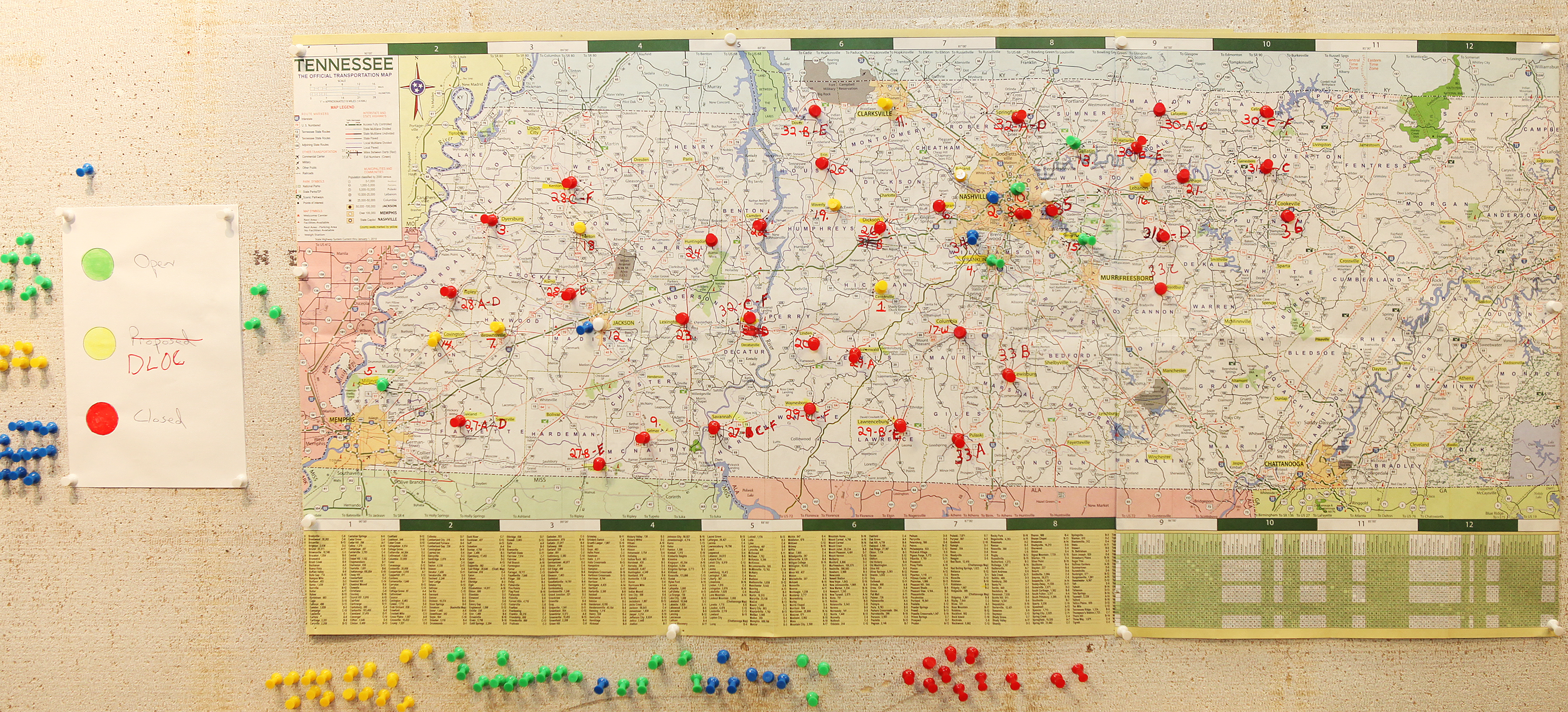
FEMA Logistics specialists use a map of Tennessee and coloured pins to create a visual reference of the location and status of Disaster Recovery Centers

Domed or gripped heads are sometimes preferred over flat heads as dropped flat-headed pins may easily point upward, posing a hazard. Drawing pins also pose a hazard of ingestion and choking, where they may do serious harm.
