= Oberuckersee =

- Municipality
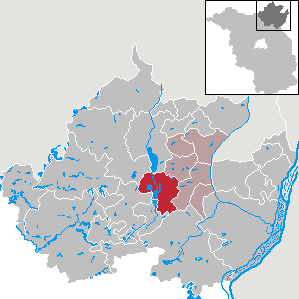
- Location of Oberuckersee within Uckermark district
- Interactive map of Oberuckersee
- Location within Germany Location within Brandenburg
- Coordinates: 53°13′04″N 13°52′48″E
- Country: Germany
- State: Brandenburg
- District: Uckermark
- Municipal assoc.: Gramzow

Government
  - Mayor (2024–29): Daniel Ruff

Area
  - Total: 84.91 km^{2} (32.78 sq mi)
- Elevation: 39 m (128 ft)

Population (2025-12-31)
  - Total: 1,576
  - Density: 18.56/km^{2} (48.07/sq mi)
- Time zone: UTC+01:00 (CET)
  - Summer (DST): UTC+02:00 (CEST)
- Postal codes: 17291
- Dialling codes: 039863
- Vehicle registration: UM
- Website: www.amtgramzow.de

Oberuckersee is a municipality in the Uckermark district, in Brandenburg, Germany.

The members of the current council as of 2026:

- Dr. Siegfried Bahr
- Christoph Berkholz
- Dietmar Grapentin
- Hartmut Küther
- Ralf Mittelstädt
- Karin Schott
- Thomas Schubert
- Christian Steckmann
- Kai Tauchert

== Demography ==
Development of Population since 1875 within the Current Boundaries (Blue Line: Population; Dotted Line: Comparison to Population Development of Brandenburg state; Grey Background: Time of Nazi rule; Red Background: Time of Communist rule)

Oberuckersee: Population development
within the current boundaries (2017)

| Year | Pop. | ±% p.a. |
|---|---|---|
| 1875 | 2,659 | — |
| 1890 | 2,465 | −0.50% |
| 1910 | 2,572 | +0.21% |
| 1925 | 2,698 | +0.32% |
| 1933 | 2,466 | −1.12% |
| 1939 | 2,293 | −1.20% |
| 1946 | 3,350 | +5.57% |
| 1950 | 3,608 | +1.87% |
| 1964 | 2,690 | −2.08% |
| 1971 | 2,636 | −0.29% |
| 1981 | 2,120 | −2.15% |
| 1985 | 2,072 | −0.57% |
| 1989 | 1,928 | −1.78% |
| 1990 | 1,907 | −1.09% |

| Year | Pop. | ±% p.a. |
|---|---|---|
| 1991 | 1,860 | −2.46% |
| 1992 | 1,836 | −1.29% |
| 1993 | 1,847 | +0.60% |
| 1994 | 1,858 | +0.60% |
| 1995 | 1,867 | +0.48% |
| 1996 | 1,894 | +1.45% |
| 1997 | 1,926 | +1.69% |
| 1998 | 1,930 | +0.21% |
| 1999 | 1,974 | +2.28% |
| 2000 | 1,978 | +0.20% |
| 2001 | 1,956 | −1.11% |
| 2002 | 1,981 | +1.28% |
| 2003 | 1,971 | −0.50% |
| 2004 | 1,943 | −1.42% |

| Year | Pop. | ±% p.a. |
|---|---|---|
| 2005 | 1,937 | −0.31% |
| 2006 | 1,905 | −1.65% |
| 2007 | 1,868 | −1.94% |
| 2008 | 1,833 | −1.87% |
| 2009 | 1,803 | −1.64% |
| 2010 | 1,763 | −2.22% |
| 2011 | 1,716 | −2.67% |
| 2012 | 1,706 | −0.58% |
| 2013 | 1,701 | −0.29% |
| 2014 | 1,687 | −0.82% |
| 2015 | 1,698 | +0.65% |
| 2016 | 1,682 | −0.94% |
| 2017 | 1,673 | −0.54% |
