= Gramzow =

- Municipality
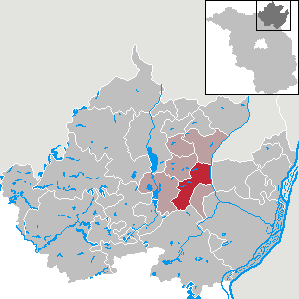
- Location of Gramzow within Uckermark district
- Interactive map of Gramzow
- Location within Germany Location within Brandenburg
- Coordinates: 53°13′00″N 14°00′00″E
- Country: Germany
- State: Brandenburg
- District: Uckermark
- Municipal assoc.: Gramzow

Government
  - Mayor (2024–29): Uwe Koch

Area
  - Total: 65.67 km^{2} (25.36 sq mi)
- Elevation: 65 m (213 ft)

Population (2025-12-31)
  - Total: 1,691
  - Density: 25.75/km^{2} (66.69/sq mi)
- Time zone: UTC+01:00 (CET)
  - Summer (DST): UTC+02:00 (CEST)
- Postal codes: 17291
- Dialling codes: 039861
- Vehicle registration: UM
- Website: www.amtgramzow.de

Gramzow is a municipality in the Uckermark district, in Brandenburg, Germany.

== Demography ==
Development of Population since 1875 within the Current Boundaries (Blue Line: Population; Dotted Line: Comparison to Population Development of Brandenburg state; Grey Background: Time of Nazi rule; Red Background: Time of Communist rule)

Gramzow: Population development
within the current boundaries (2017)

Year	Pop.	±% p.a.
1875	4,066	—
1890	3,829	−0.40%
1910	3,669	−0.21%
1925	3,682	+0.02%
1933	3,420	−0.92%
1939	3,328	−0.45%
1946	4,173	+3.29%
1950	4,548	+2.17%
1964	3,529	−1.80%
1971	3,421	−0.44%
1981	2,699	−2.34%
1985	2,513	−1.77%
1989	2,365	−1.51%
1990	2,328	−1.56%
1991	2,280	−2.06%

Year	Pop.	±% p.a.
1992	2,233	−2.06%
1993	2,232	−0.04%
1994	2,238	+0.27%
1995	2,252	+0.63%
1996	2,228	−1.07%
1997	2,237	+0.40%
1998	2,261	+1.07%
1999	2,254	−0.31%
2000	2,233	−0.93%
2001	2,220	−0.58%
2002	2,177	−1.94%
2003	2,145	−1.47%
2004	2,147	+0.09%
2005	2,110	−1.72%
2006	2,048	−2.94%

Year	Pop.	±% p.a.
2007	2,081	+1.61%
2008	2,057	−1.15%
2009	1,997	−2.92%
2010	1,986	−0.55%
2011	1,972	−0.70%
2012	1,950	−1.12%
2013	1,923	−1.38%
2014	1,918	−0.26%
2015	1,901	−0.89%
2016	1,897	−0.21%
2017	1,856	−2.16%
2018	1,836	−1.08%
2019	1,800	−1.96%
