= Uckermark =

Historical region in northeastern Germany

- Historical region
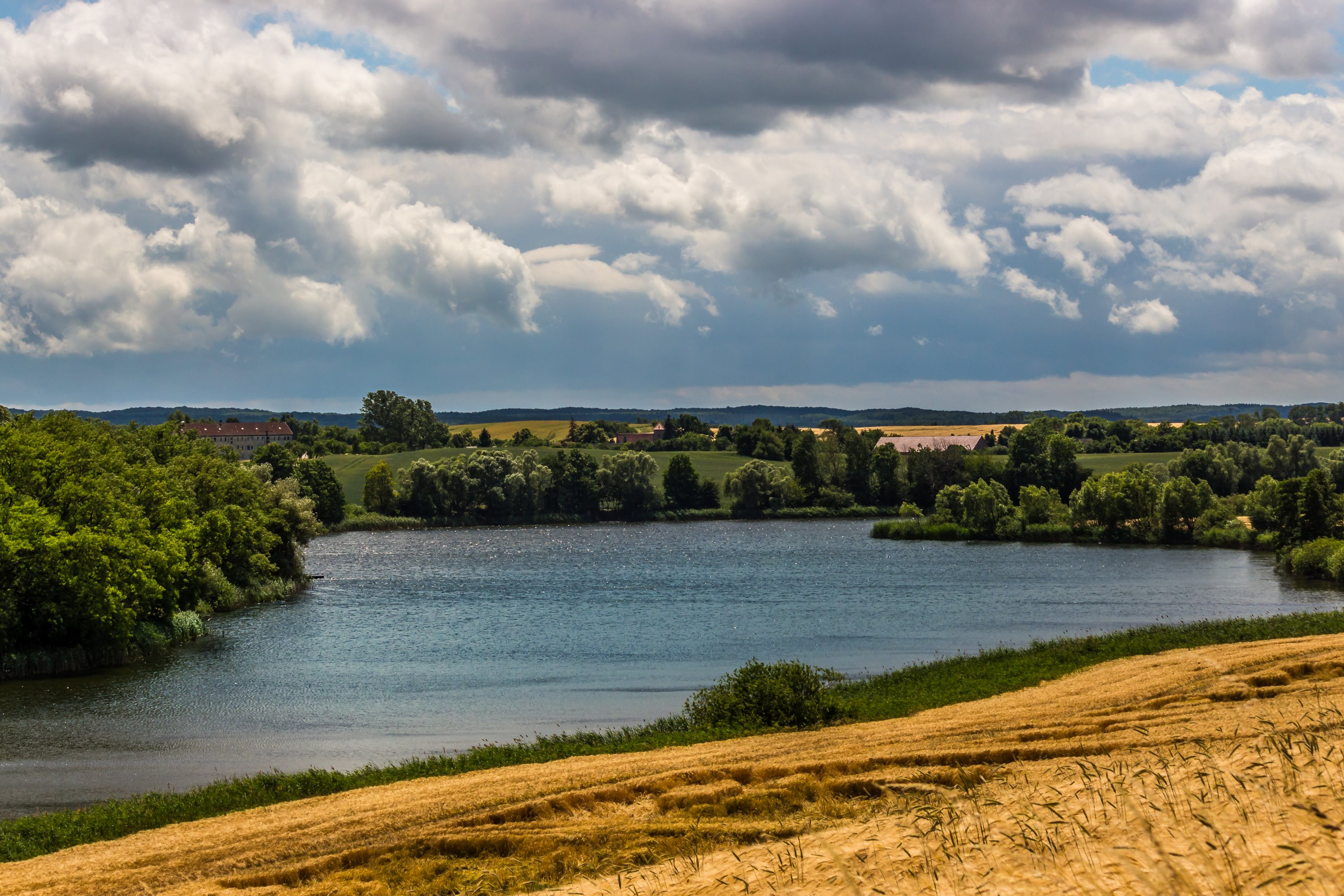
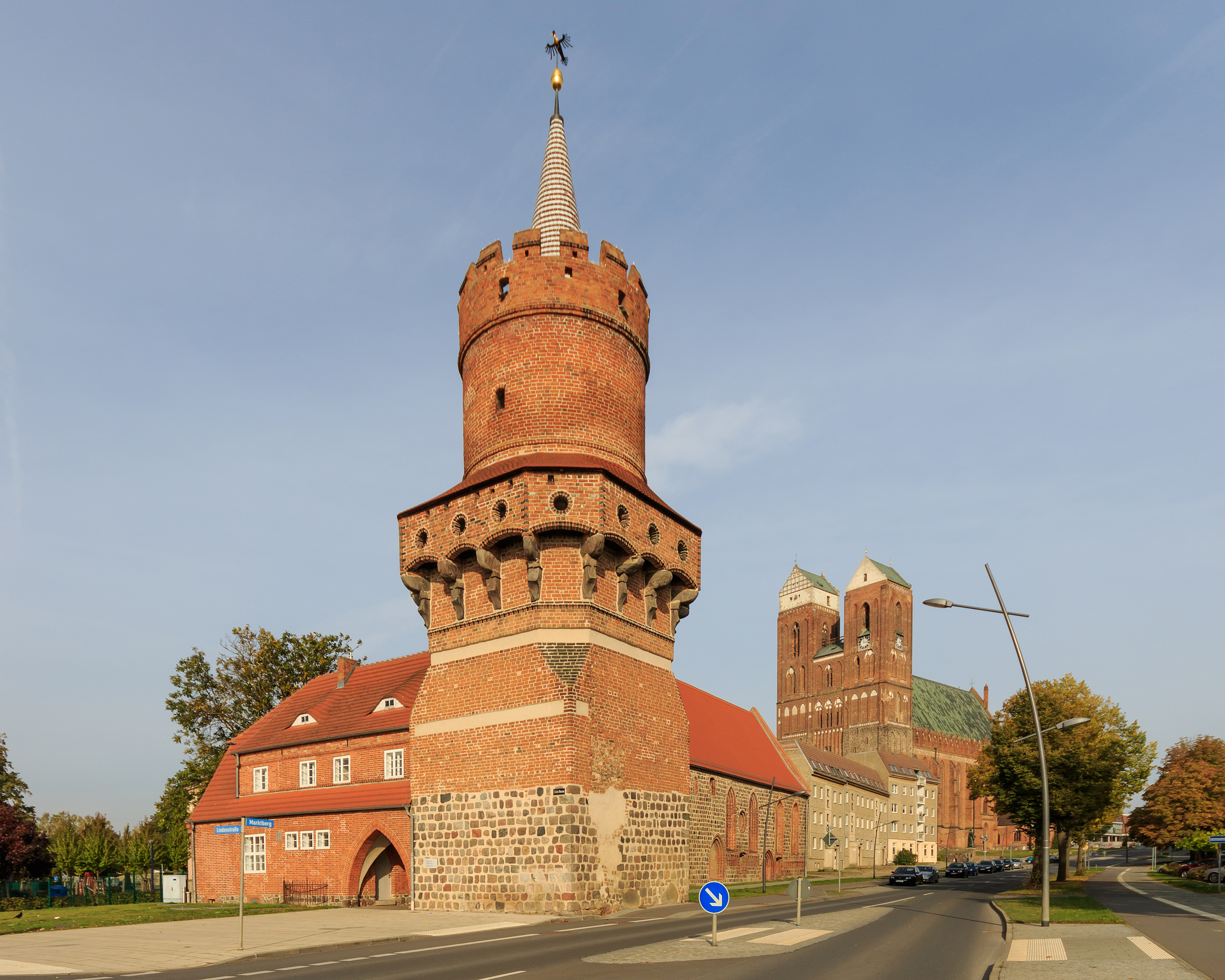
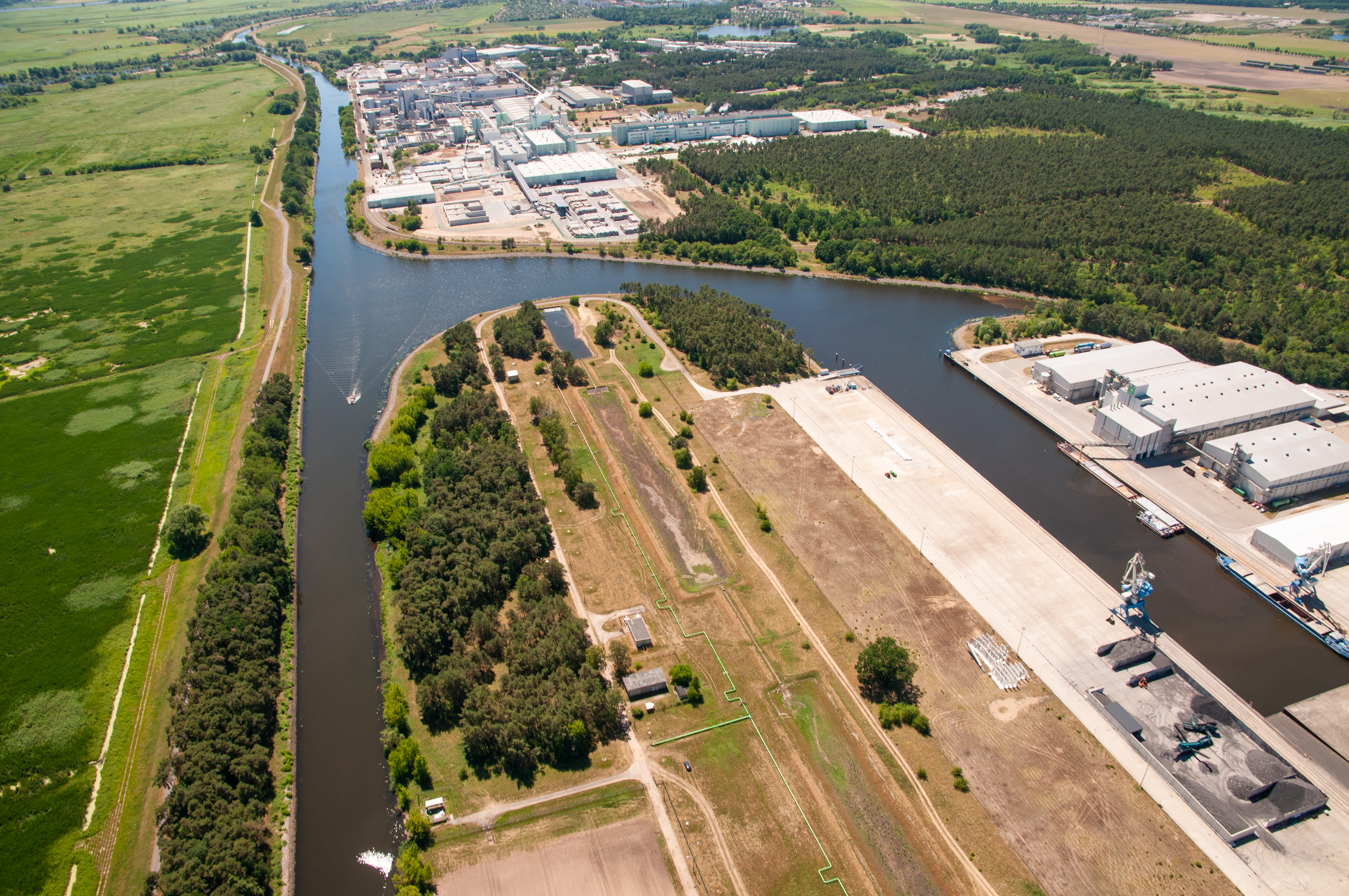
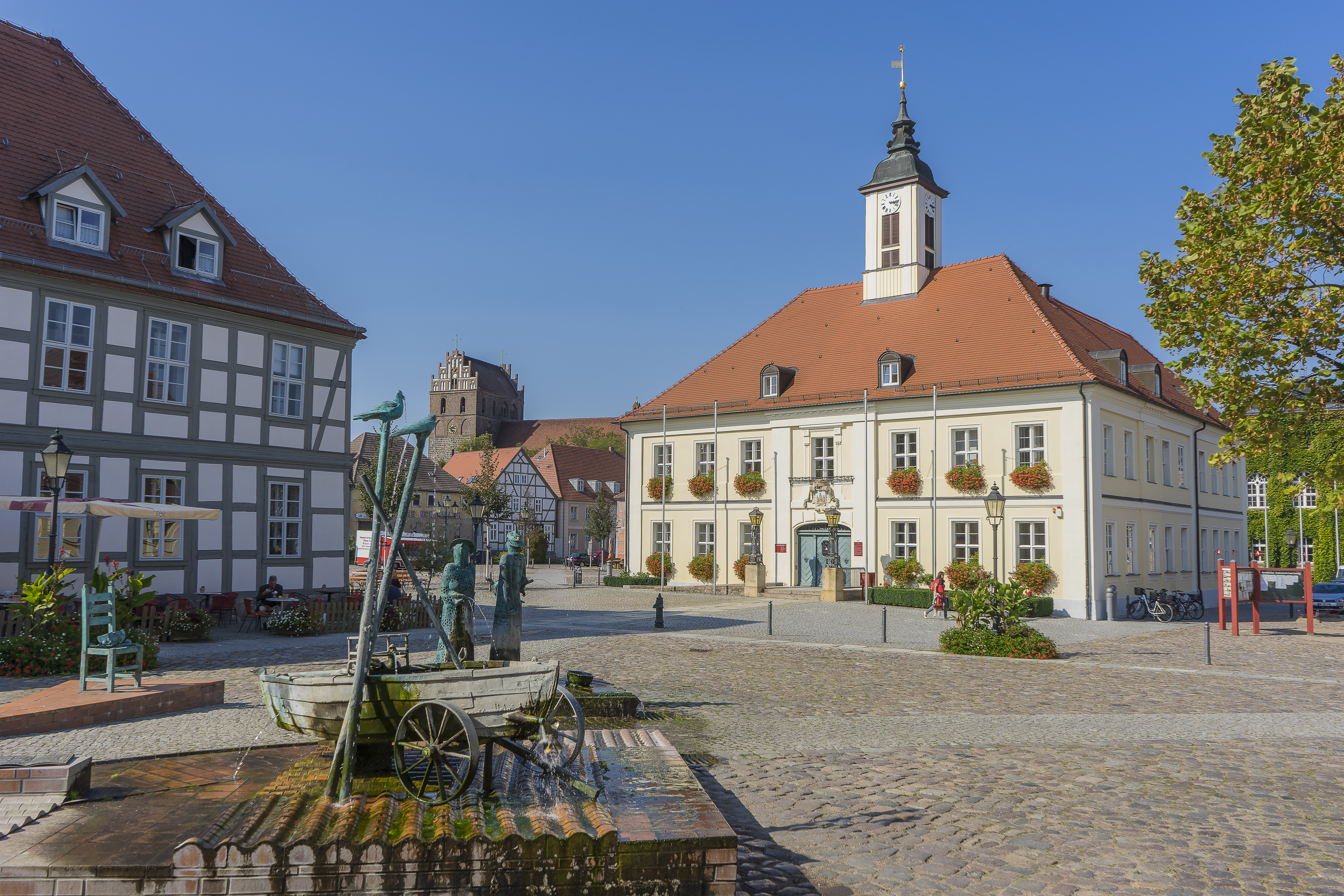
- From top, left to right: Landscape of Uckermark; Medieval Middle Gate (Mitteltor) and St Mary Church in Prenzlau; River harbour in Schwedt; Market Square and Town Hall in Angermünde
- Interactive map of Uckermark
- Country: Germany
- Traditional capital: Prenzlau
- Time zone: UTC+1 (CET)
  - Summer (DST): UTC+2 (CEST)

The Uckermark (German pronunciation: [ˈʊkɐˌmaʁk]) is a historical region in northeastern Germany, which currently straddles the Uckermark District of Brandenburg and the Vorpommern-Greifswald District of Mecklenburg-Vorpommern. Its traditional capital is Prenzlau.

== Geography ==
The region is named after the Uecker River, which is a tributary of the Oder; the name Uckermark means "March of the Uecker". The river's source is close to Angermünde, from where it runs northward to Mecklenburg-Vorpommern. The Oder River, forming the German-Polish border, bounds the region in the east. The western parts of the Lower Oder Valley National Park are located in the Uckermark.

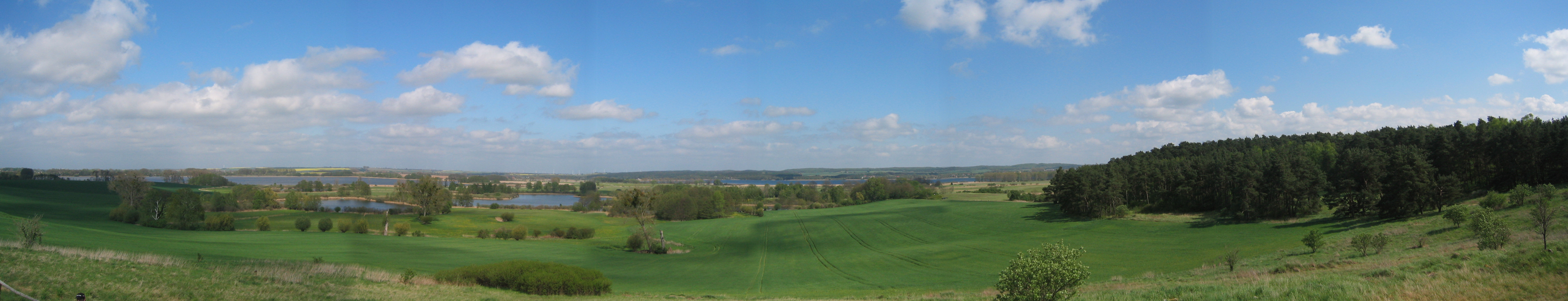
View of the Uecker Valley in the Uckermark

== History ==
=== Early history ===
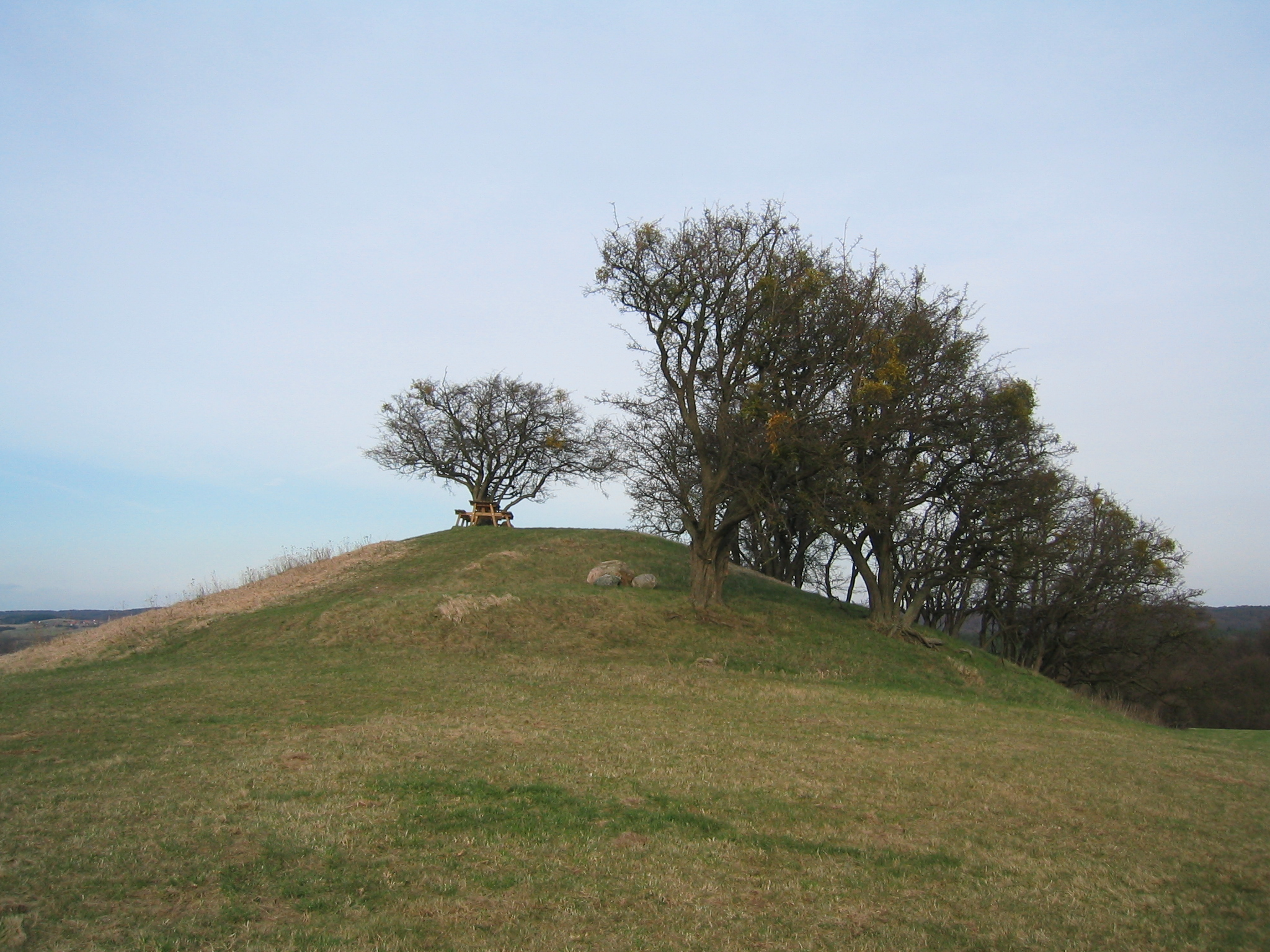
Pechberg Bronze Age Megalith tomb near Vossberg

In the Ice Age, glaciers shaped the landscape of the region. A climate change left a hilly area with several lakes formed by the melting ice, and humans started to settle the area. Megalithic-cultures arose, followed by Germanic cultures.

=== Ukrani, a Polabian tribe ===
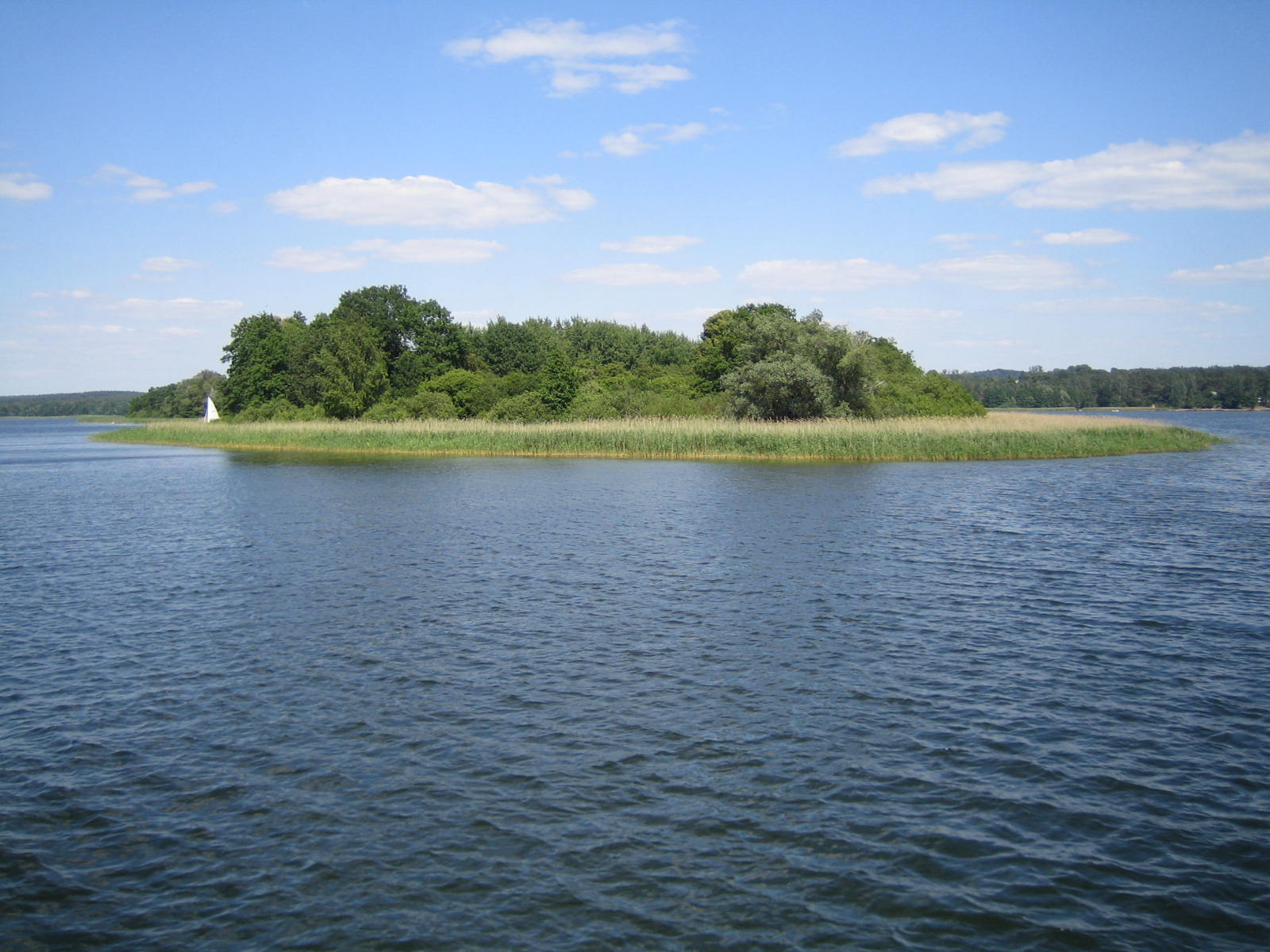
Burgwallinsel Ukrani burgh isle in Lake Oberuckersee

From the 6th–12th centuries Polabian Slavs migrating from Eastern Europe moved westward into the later Uckermark. The Slavs settling the terra U(c)kera (Uckerland, later Uckermark) became known as Ukrani (Ukranen, Ukrer, Ukri, Vukraner). Their settlement area was centered around the lakes Oberuckersee and Unteruckersee at the spring of the Uecker River. In this region, burghs with a proto-town suburbium were set up at Drense and on an isle in Lake Oberuckersee (near modern Prenzlau).

In 954, Margrave Gero of the Saxon Eastern March (the marca Geronis), aided by Holy Roman Emperor Otto I's son-in-law, Conrad of Lorraine, launched a successful campaign to subdue the Ukrani, who had come in reach of the Empire after the 929 Battle of Lenzen. After the 983 revolt of the Obodrites and Liutizians, the area became independent again, yet remained under permanent military pressure, especially from Poland and the Holy Roman Empire.

=== Pomerania, Ostsiedlung ===
In 1172 Pomeranian dukes, vassals of the Duchy of Saxony, formerly of Poland, and later of Denmark and the Holy Roman Empire, controlled the area. In the course of the medieval Ostsiedlung, the Ukrani were Christianized and Germanized by Saxons, who founded monasteries, castles, and towns; the Slavic heritage is reflected in the many regional towns whose names end with "-ow" and "-in". The early centers of the territory were the Seehausen (Gramzow) Premonstratensian monastery and the city of Prenzlau, developed and granted German town law by Barnim I, Duke of Pomerania, in 1234. Both the central city and the central monastery were set up beside the former Ukrani central burghs.

=== Pomerania and Brandenburg struggle for overlordship ===
The Margraviate of Brandenburg, holding claims on the Duchy of Pomerania, expanded north since the 1230s, taking her chances while the House of Pomerania was weakened. In the 1250 Treaty of Landin, Barnim I conceded the Uckermark to John I and Otto III, Ascanian Margraves of Brandenburg.

After the extinction of the Ascanians, it was contested by several principalities. In 1319 it was seized by Mecklenburg. In 1320 the allied forces of the duchies of Pomerania and Jawor clashed with Mecklenburg in the Uckermark. In late 1320, a portion of the Uckermark was occupied by Saxe-Wittenberg, whereas the northernmost parts with Prenzlau and Pasewalk remained under Pomeranian control. War between Pomerania and Mecklenburg continued in 1322 with Pomerania recapturing Torgelow. Mecklenburg lost her gains in a 1323 war with Brandenburg.

In the Pomeranian-Brandenburg War from 1329–33, Pomerania was able to defeat Brandenburg at Kremmer Damm. In the following years, control of the Uckermark was disputed by Brandenburg, Mecklenburg, and Pomerania.

=== Brandenburg ===
The first Peace of Prenzlau of 3 May 1448 established Brandenburg's control over most of the territory, except for the northern Pasewalk and Torgelow region, which was to remain in Pomerania and is not considered to be a part of Uckermark anymore. Though another Brandenburgian-Pomeranian war was fought in the area in the 1460s, Brandenburg's possession of most of the Uckermark was confirmed again in a second Peace of Prenzlau on 30 July 1472, which was renewed on 26 June 1479.

=== Prussia, and Huguenot settlement ===
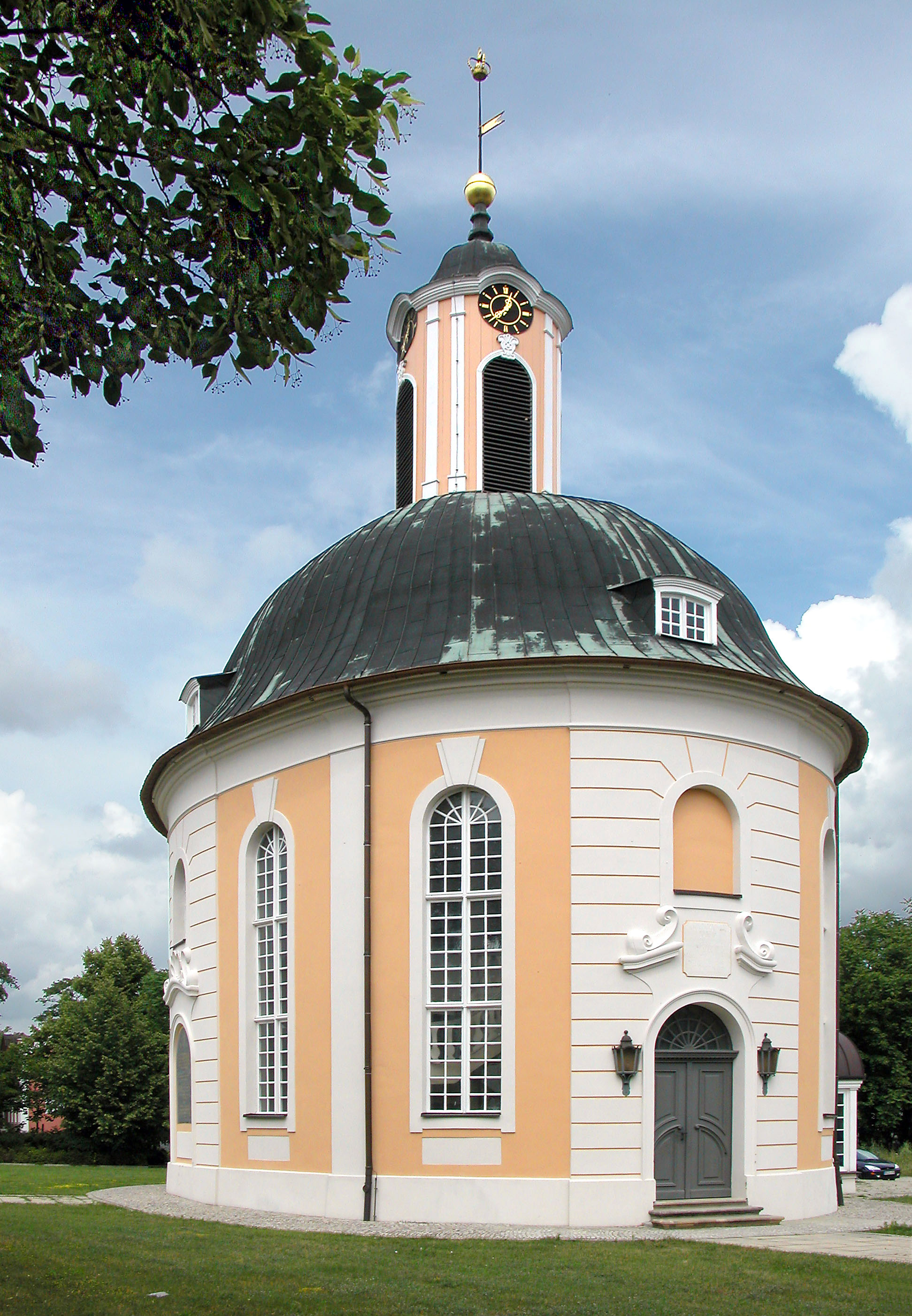
Former French church in Schwedt

The Uckermark became part of Brandenburg-Prussia in 1618, but was ravaged during the Thirty Years' War. Frederick William, the Great Elector, invited large numbers of French Huguenots to resettle the Uckermark and his other territories by announcing the Edict of Potsdam. These Huguenots helped to develop the economy and culture of the Uckermark. In 1701 the territory became part of the Kingdom of Prussia.

In 1815 after the Napoleonic Wars, the Uckermark became part of the Prussian Province of Brandenburg. Previously divided into the administrative units Uckerkreis and Stolpirischer Kreis, in 1817 a third district was created in the area, the district of Angermünde, and the other two districts were renamed Prenzlau and Templin.

During World War II, Germany operated the Oflag II-A and Oflag 80 prisoner-of-war camps for Polish and Belgian officers in Prenzlau.

=== Post-World War II ===
The Uckermark was a battleground during World War II, with many of its towns being severely damaged. As part of East Germany after the war, the Uckermark was divided between Bezirk Neubrandenburg and Bezirk Frankfurt (Oder). With German reunification in 1990, most of the Uckermark voted to become part of the restored state of Brandenburg, with the exception of the small Strasburg region becoming part of Mecklenburg-Vorpommern.

== See also ==
- History of Pomerania
