= Harangi Dam =

Dam and reservoir in Karnataka, India

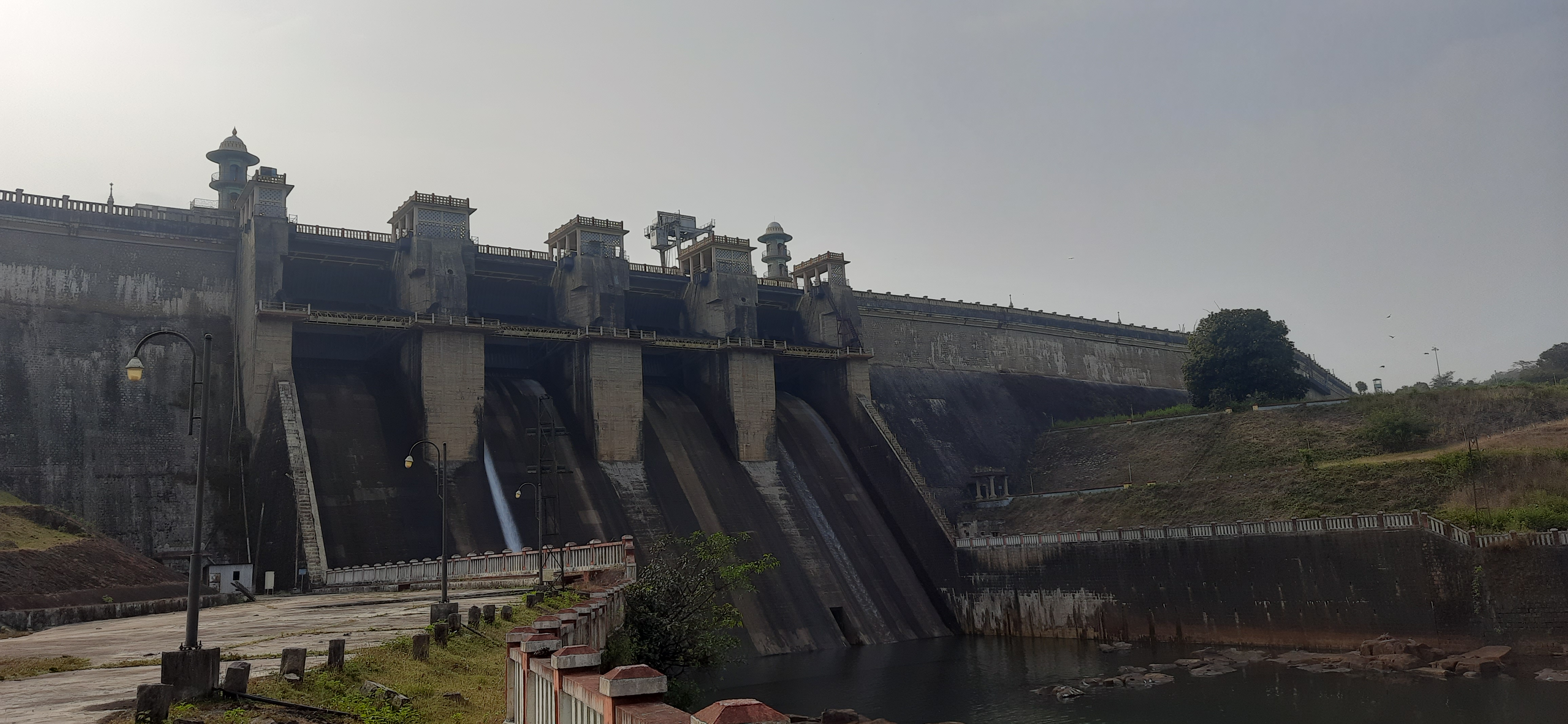
- Interactive map of Harangi Dam
- Location: Hudgur, Kushalnagar, Kodagu, Karnataka, India
- Coordinates: 12°29′30″N 75°54′20″E
- Construction began: 1969
- Opening date: 1982
- Operator: Karnataka Irrigation Department

Dam and spillways
- Impounds: Harangi River
- Height: 164 ft
- Length: 2775 ft

Reservoir
- Total capacity: 8.50 Tmcft
- Catchment area: 419.58 sq.km

The Harangi Dam is located near Hudgur village, Kushalnagar taluk in Kodagu district in the Indian state of Karnataka. The masonry dam is built across the river Harangi, a tributary of the Kaveri. The dam is located about 9 km (5.6 mi) from the heart of Kushalnagar town.

== History ==
The Harangi Hydroelectric Project was set up by Energy Development Company Limited (EDCL) on the Left bank of Harangi Dam, parallel to left bank irrigation canal. The 9 megawatt (2×4.5 MW) project was started in April 1997, and was fully into commercial operation by July 1999. It falls under the "Small" category of hydropower projects (3-25 MW).

The estimated project cost was Rs. 11.06 crores (Rs. 110.6 million) and the actual cost escalated to Rs. 58.00 crores (Rs. 580.0 million). The reservoir covers an area of 20.03 km^{2} (7.73 sq mi).

Phase-II of the project is to install a 6 megawatt unit, currently under planning.

== Geography ==
The Harangi River originates in the Pushpagiri Hills of the Western Ghats in Kodagu, Karnataka. Heavy rainfall from the south-west monsoon is the source of water in its catchment area which is about 419.58 km^{2} (162.00 sq mi). The Harangi is the first major tributary of the Kaveri. The length of the Harangi from its origin to the confluence with the Kaveri river is 50 km (31 mi). The Harangi joins the Kaveri near Kudige, 5 km (3.1 mi) north of Kushalnagar.

The Harangi Reservoir, located before the confluence, covers an area of 20.03 km^{2} (7.73 sq mi). The catchment area is a rich biosphere. Between the open water and the dry land are marshy wetlands.

The area has a highland climate without extreme variations. The rainfall is mostly from the southwest monsoon, during June to September.

=== Flora ===
Kodagu district is one of the most densely forested districts in India, with about 80% tree cover and 36% covered with forests. Based on the rainfall, the district is classified into Wet, Intermediate and Dry zones. The forests surrounding the Harangi reservoir include several types: scrub, deciduous, semi-evergreen and evergreen.

=== Fauna ===
==== Birds ====
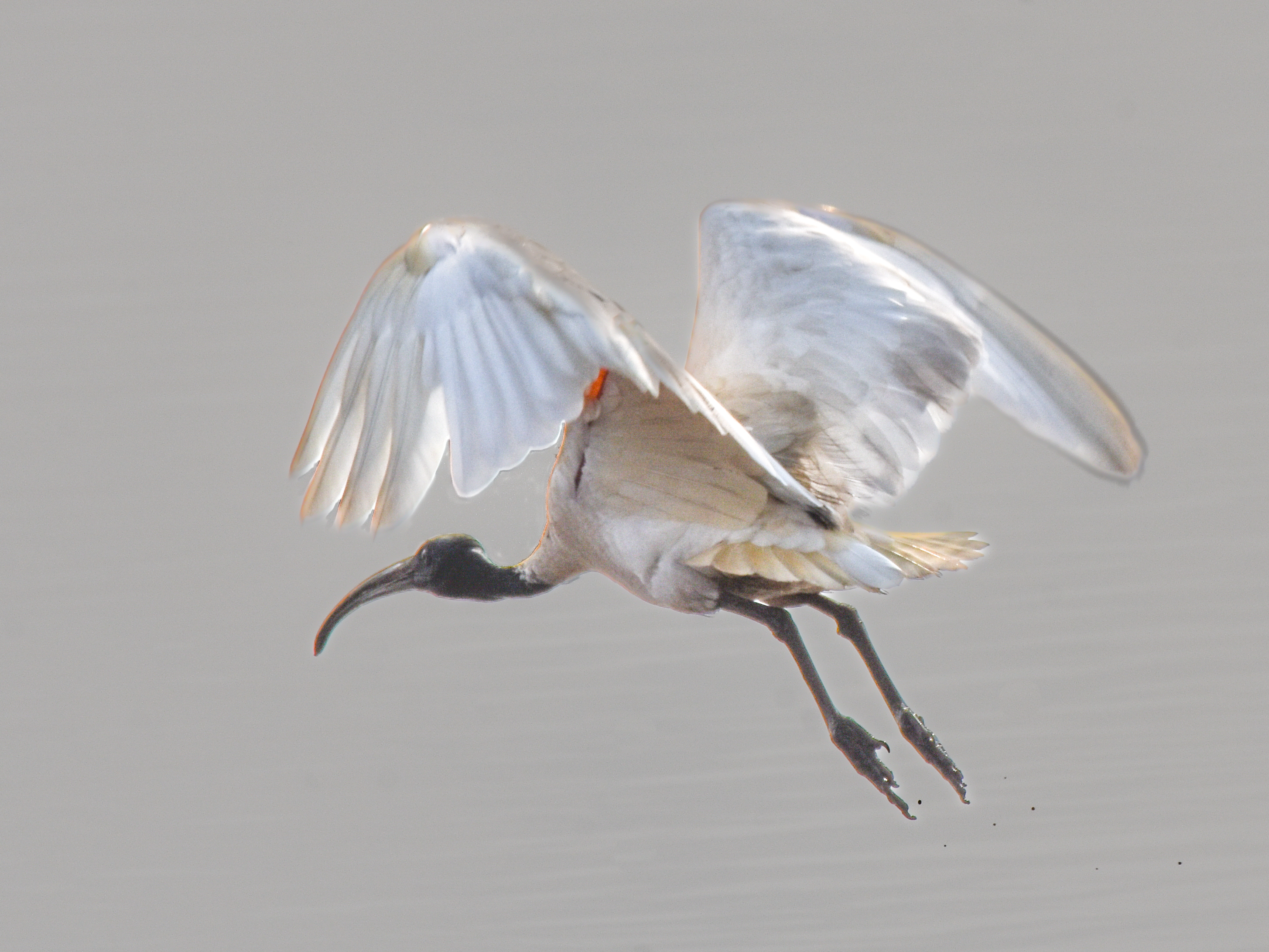
Black-headed ibis (Threskiornis melanocephalus), ca. April 2024

A study conducted in the vicinity of the Harangi Reservoir from June 2016 to May 2017 recorded 44 species of birds. The best season for birds was post-monsoon (October–January) during which all species were found and about half the species were common or abundant. In the summer season (February–May), only Red-whiskered bulbul (Pycnonotus jocosus) and Yellow-browed bulbul (Acritillas indica) were occasional, others being rare or absent. In the monsoon season (June to September), only a few egrets and ibises were occasional, with all other species being rare or absent. Kodagu district has a much larger number of bird species, 214 being recorded in a study in 2016. The online database of bird observations, eBird, reported a total of 366 species sighted as of April 2024.

==== Mammals ====
The surrounding dubare forest area and near reservoir areas are known to harbor animals like deer and monkeys.

Aquatic life

The reservoir is used for fishing, indicating a variety of fish species, through specific species are not commonly listed in tourism.

== Amenities ==
=== Harangi Tree Park and Elephant Camp ===
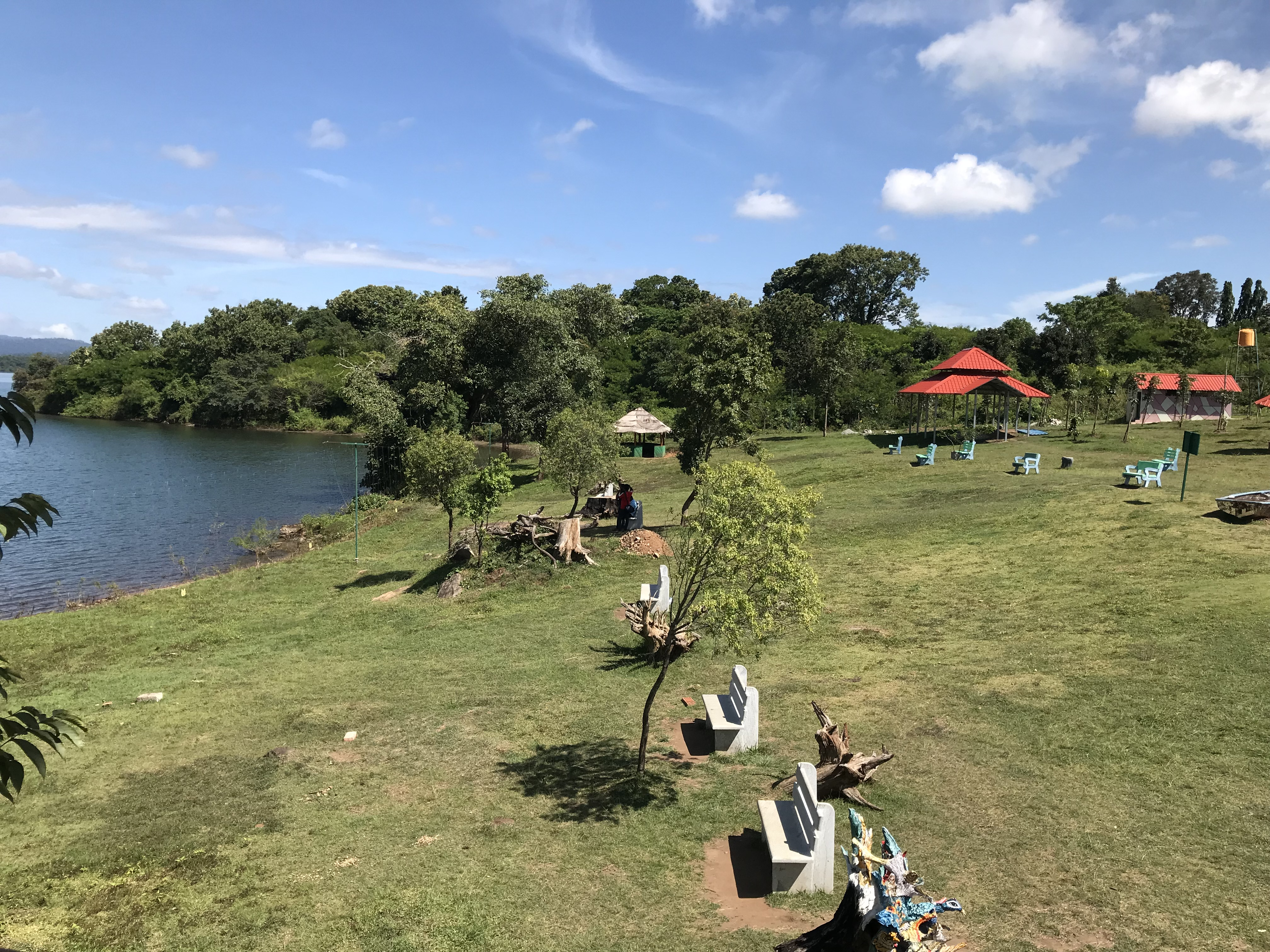
View point, Harangi Tree Park and Elephant Camp

The third Elephant Camp at Harangi was inaugurated on October 10, 2022. This is the third elephant campu in Kodagu, and the ninth elephant camp in Karnataka. The park occupies 40 acres (16 ha) on the right bank of the reservoir. The State Government had released Rs. 80 lakhs for the project to ease the burden of the existing elephant camps. The other two elephant camps in Kodagu are at Dubare and Mathigodu near the Anechowkur Gate that borders Mysuru.

=== Harangi Backwater Resorts ===
The state government is partnering with Jungle Lodges and Resorts and Karnataka State Tourism Development Corporation Limited to promote watersports at Harangi Dam.

== Gallery ==
=== Reservoir ===
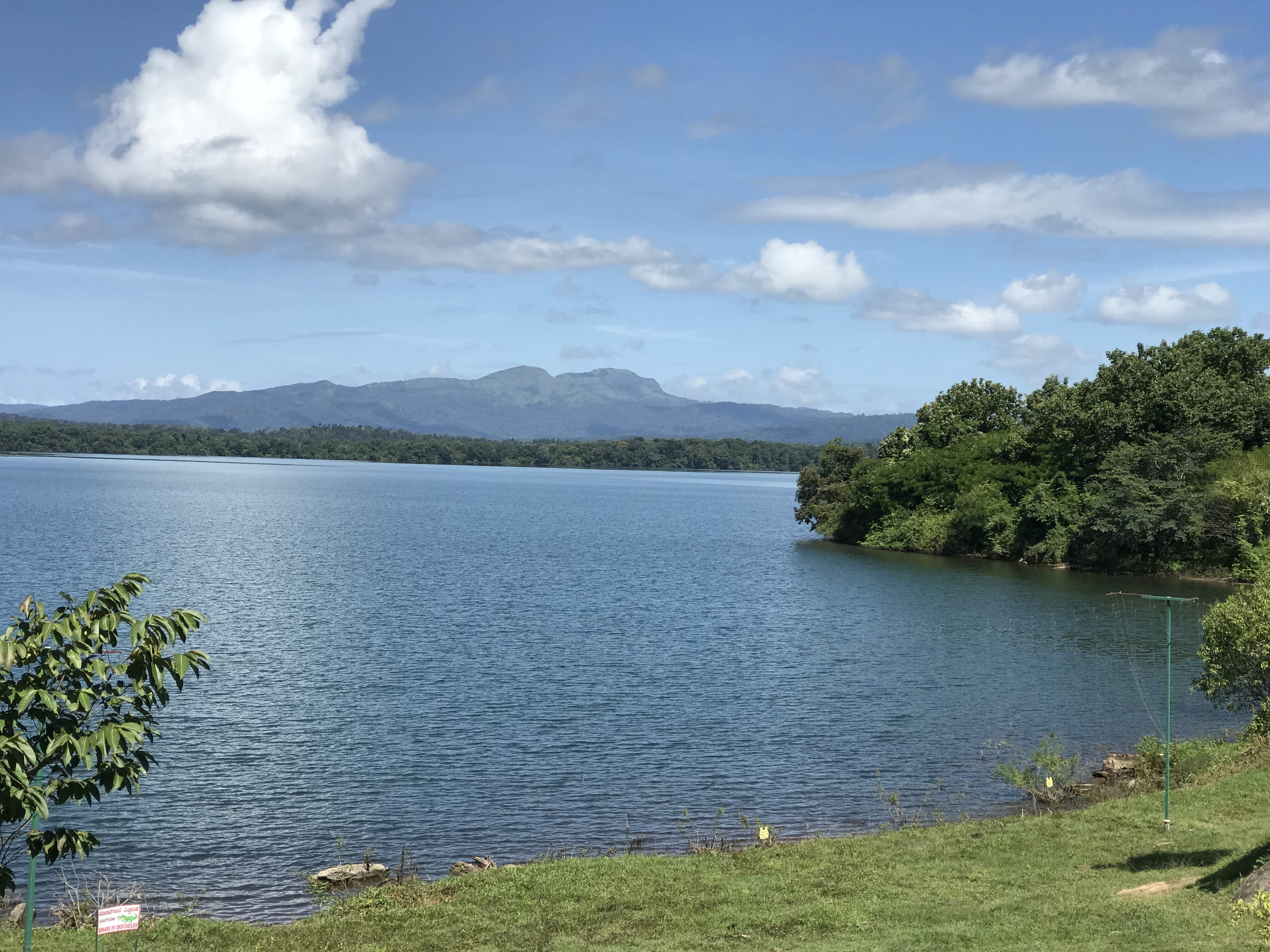
Harangi Dam Reservoir viewed from Harangi Elephant Camp & Tree Park

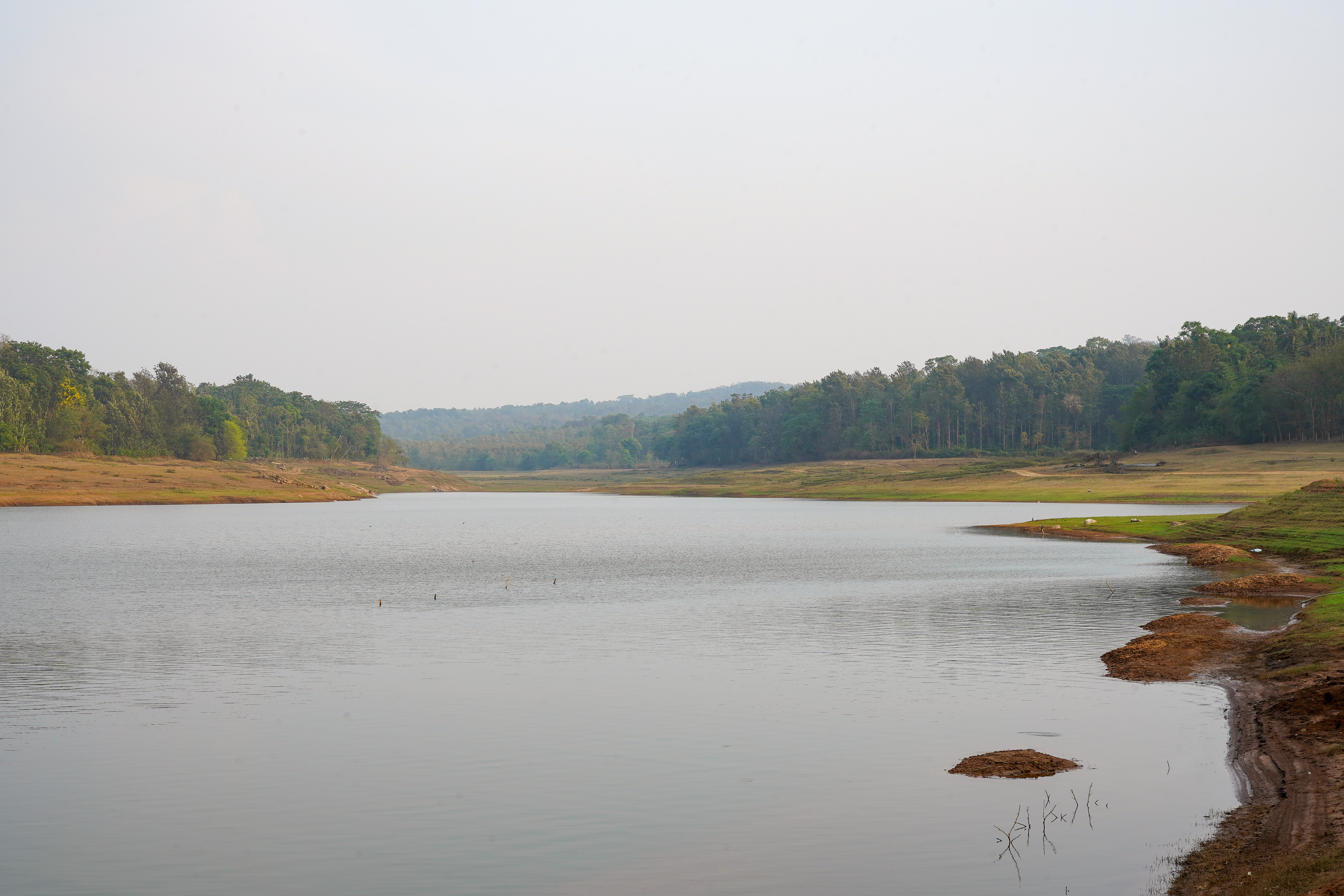
South-east view from west bank of Harangi Reservoir, April 2024

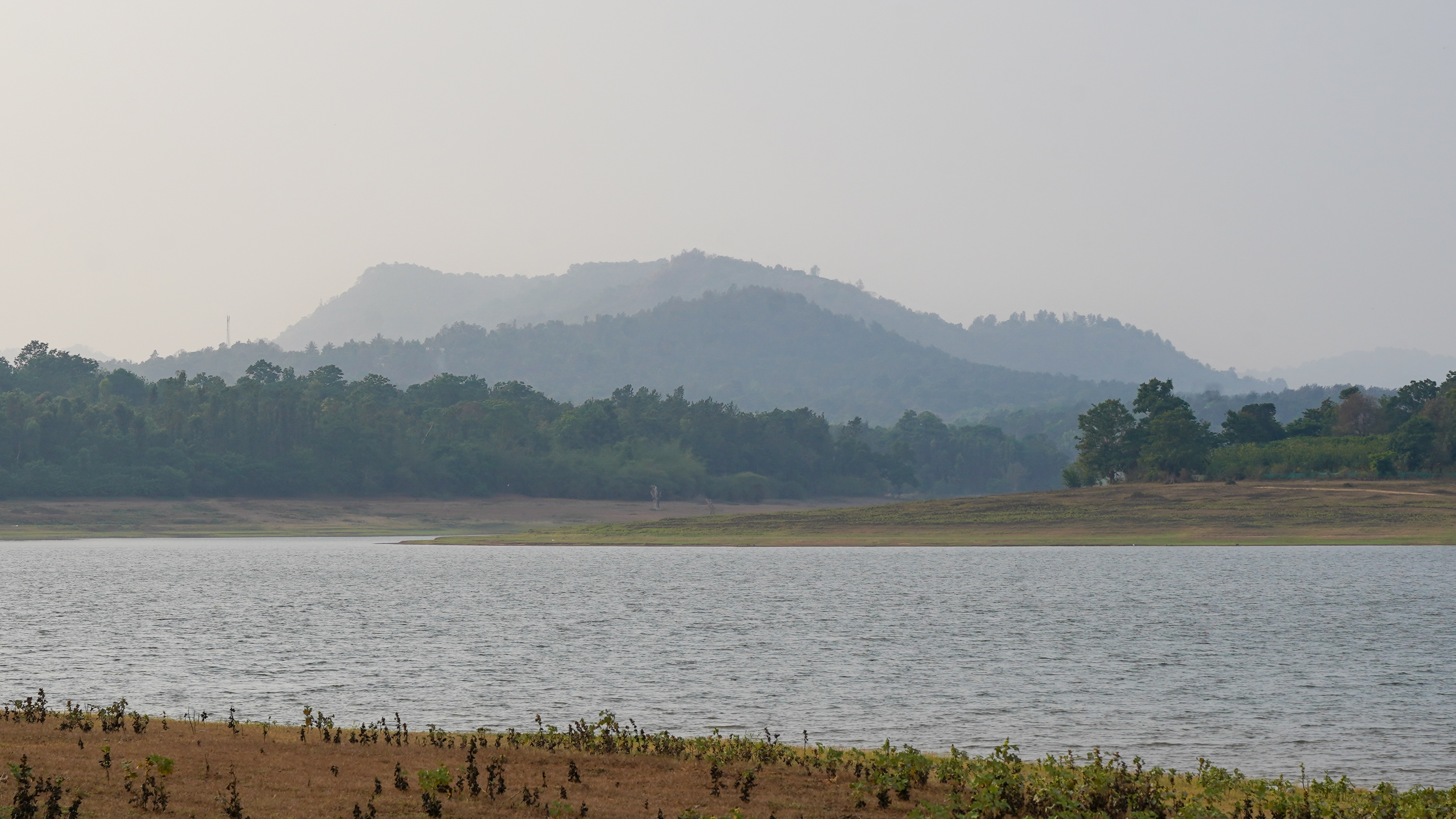
Central reservoir, backdrop of the Western Ghats, ca. April 2024

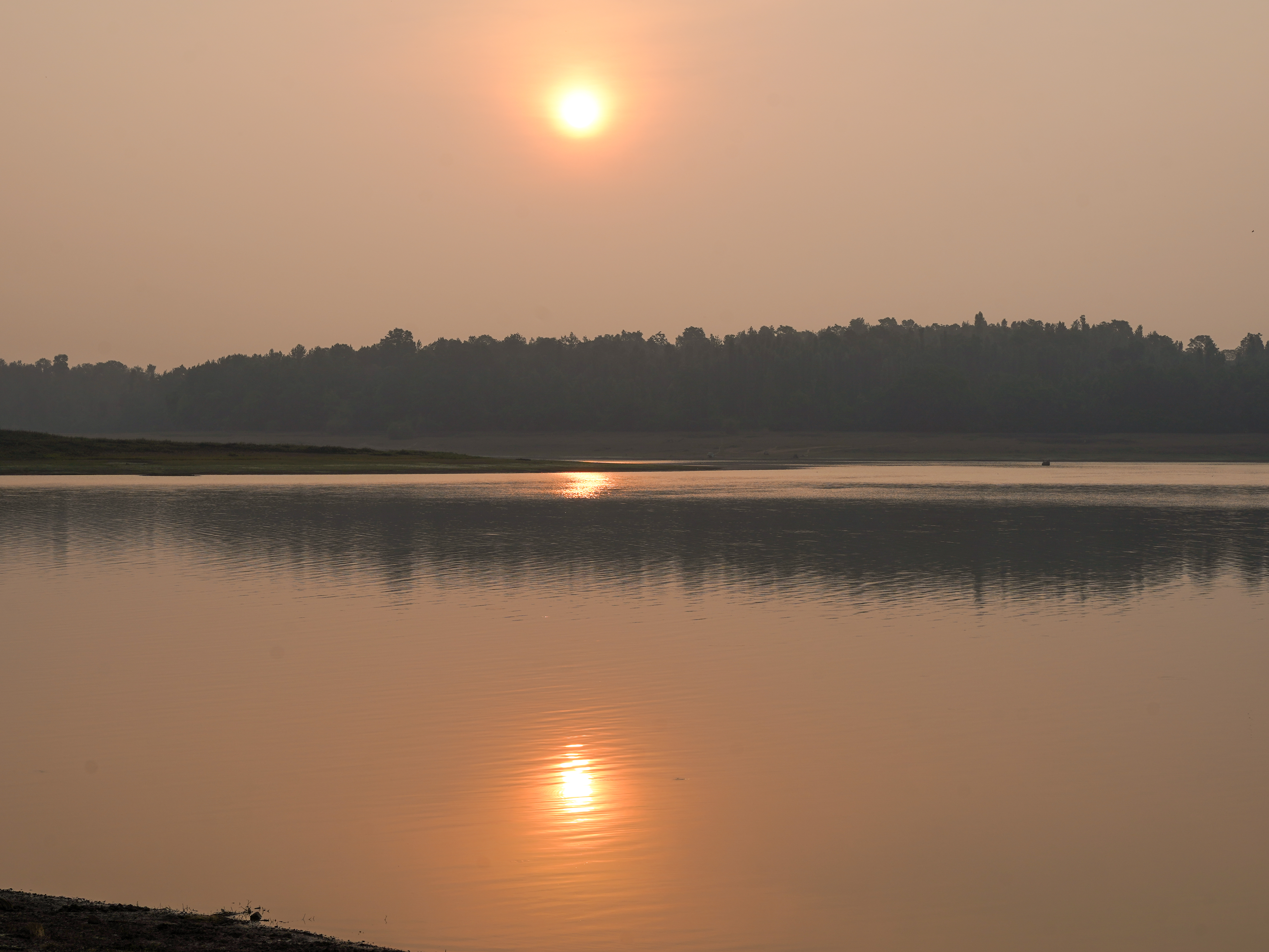
Sunrise over central reservoir, ca. April 2024

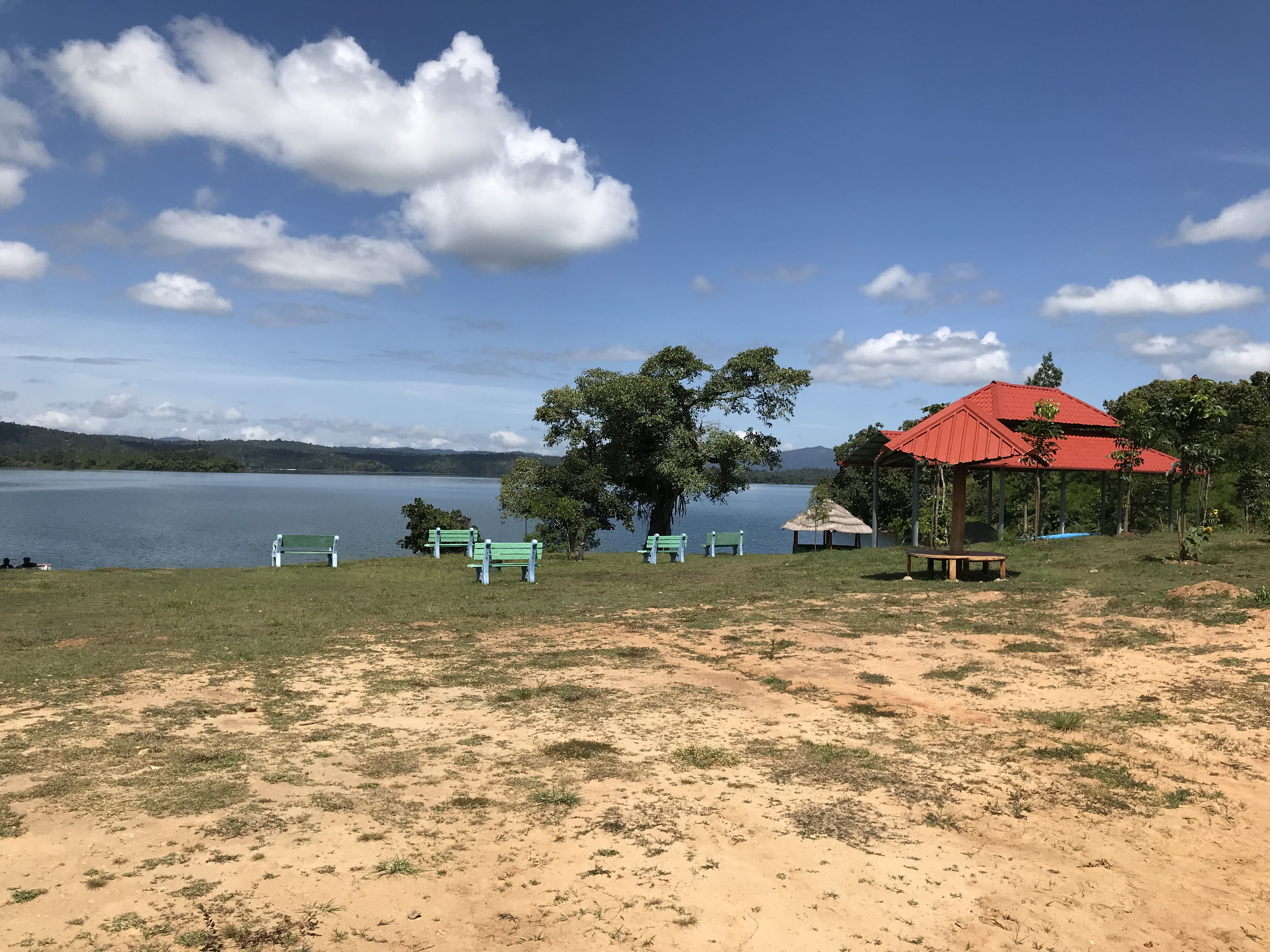
Sitting areas in Harangi Elephant Camp & Tree Park

=== Birds ===
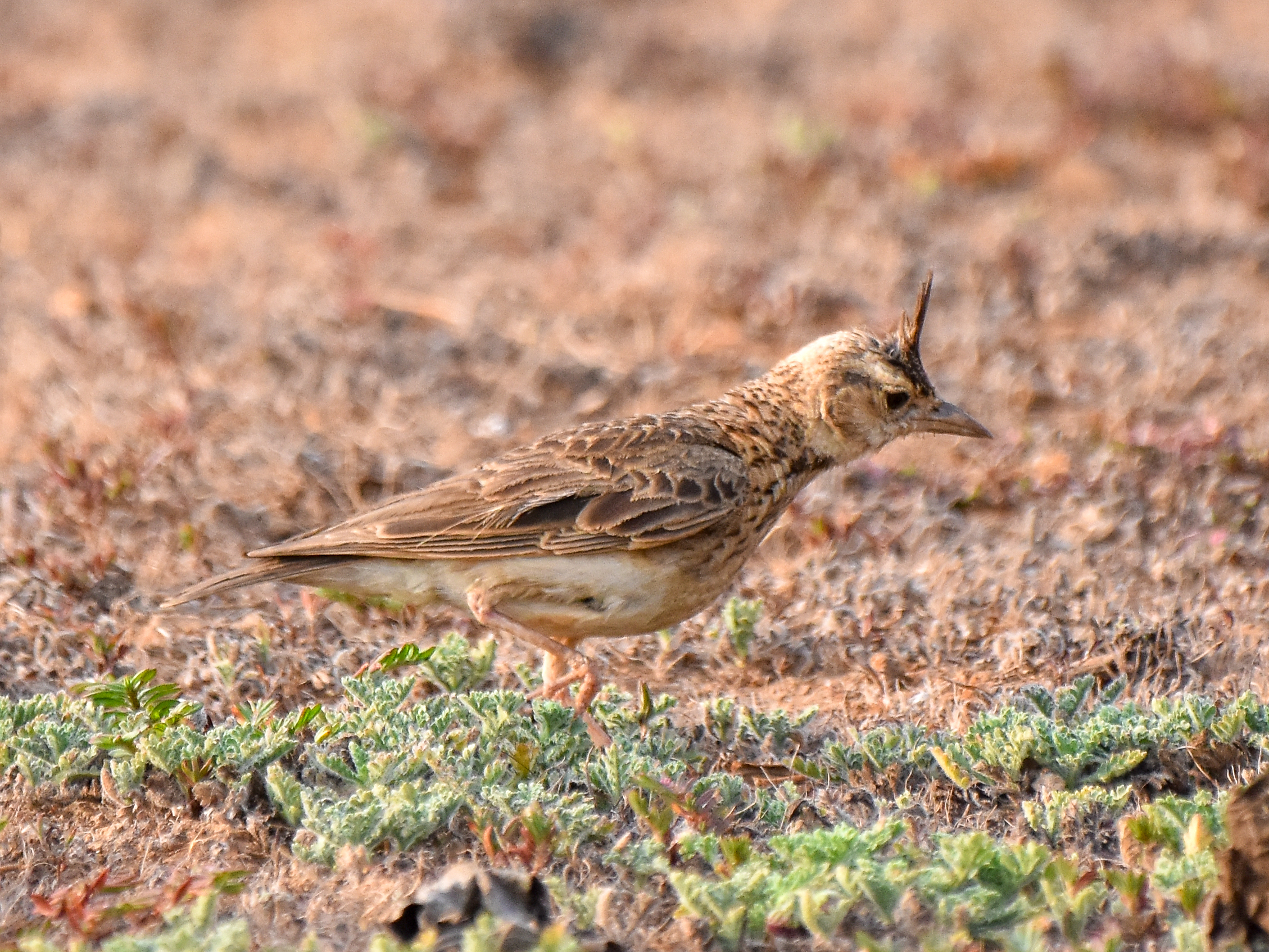
Oriental skylark (Alauda gulgula) blending with grassland, April 2024

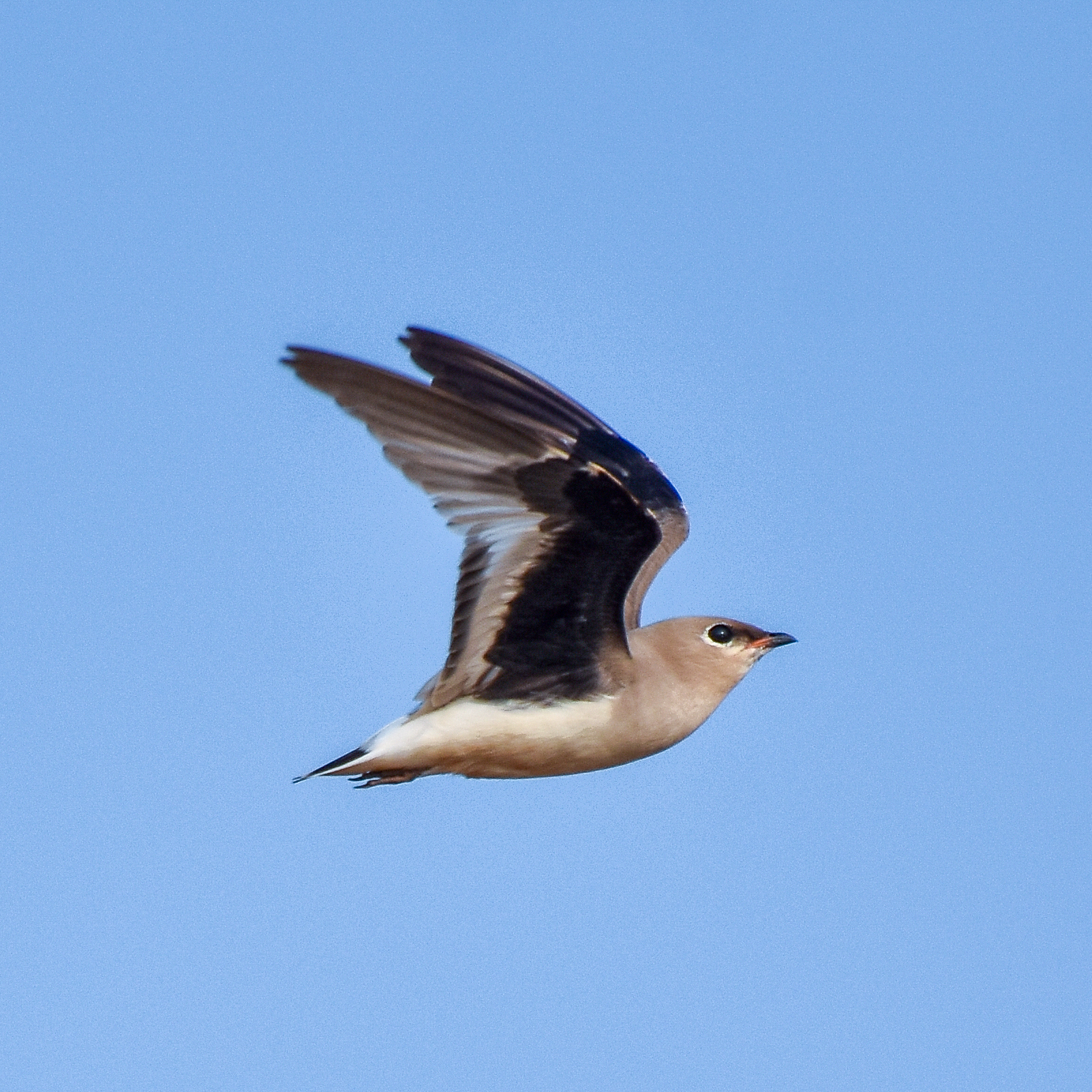
Small pratincole (Glareola lactea) in flight, April 2024

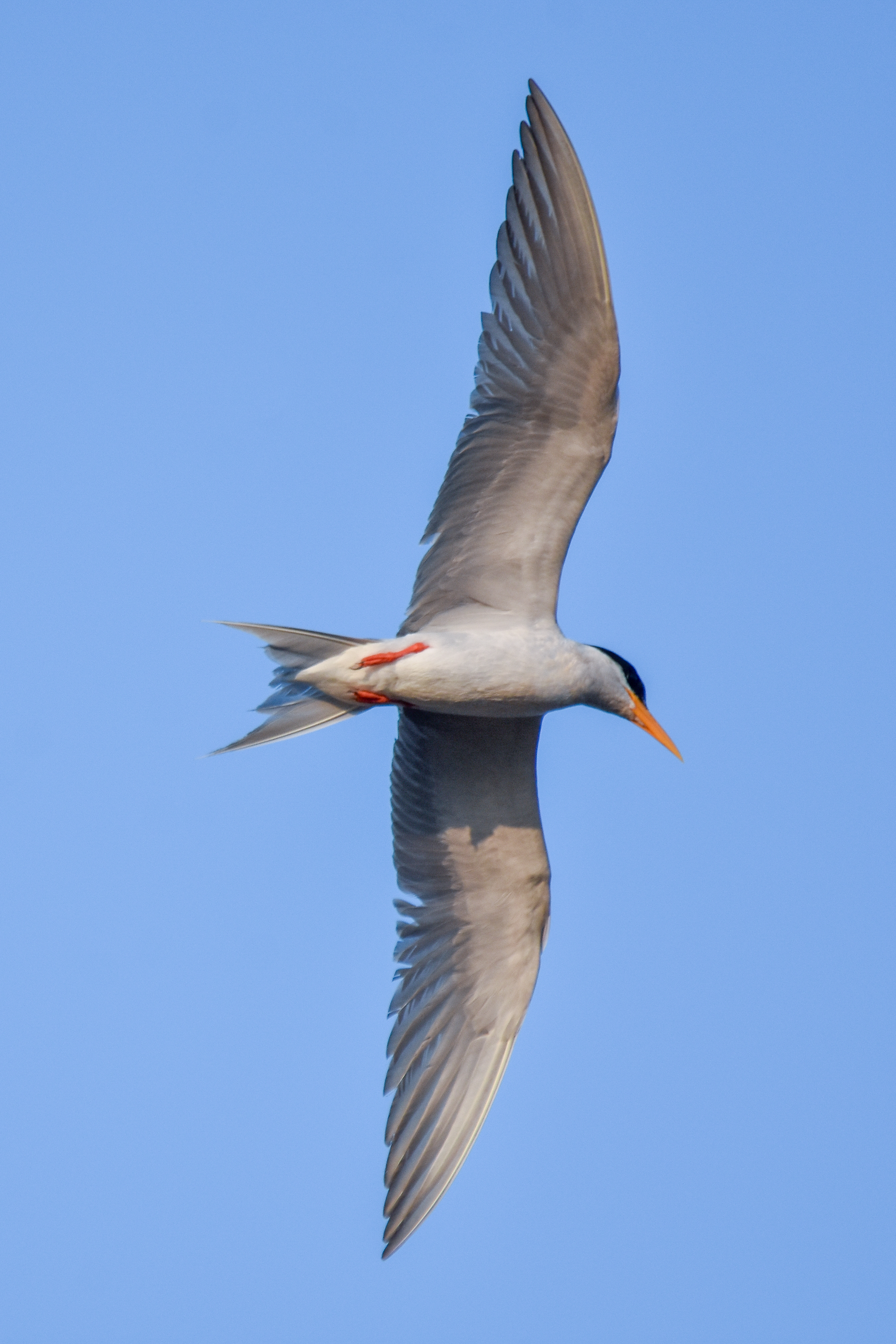
River tern (Sterna aurantia) in flight, April 2024

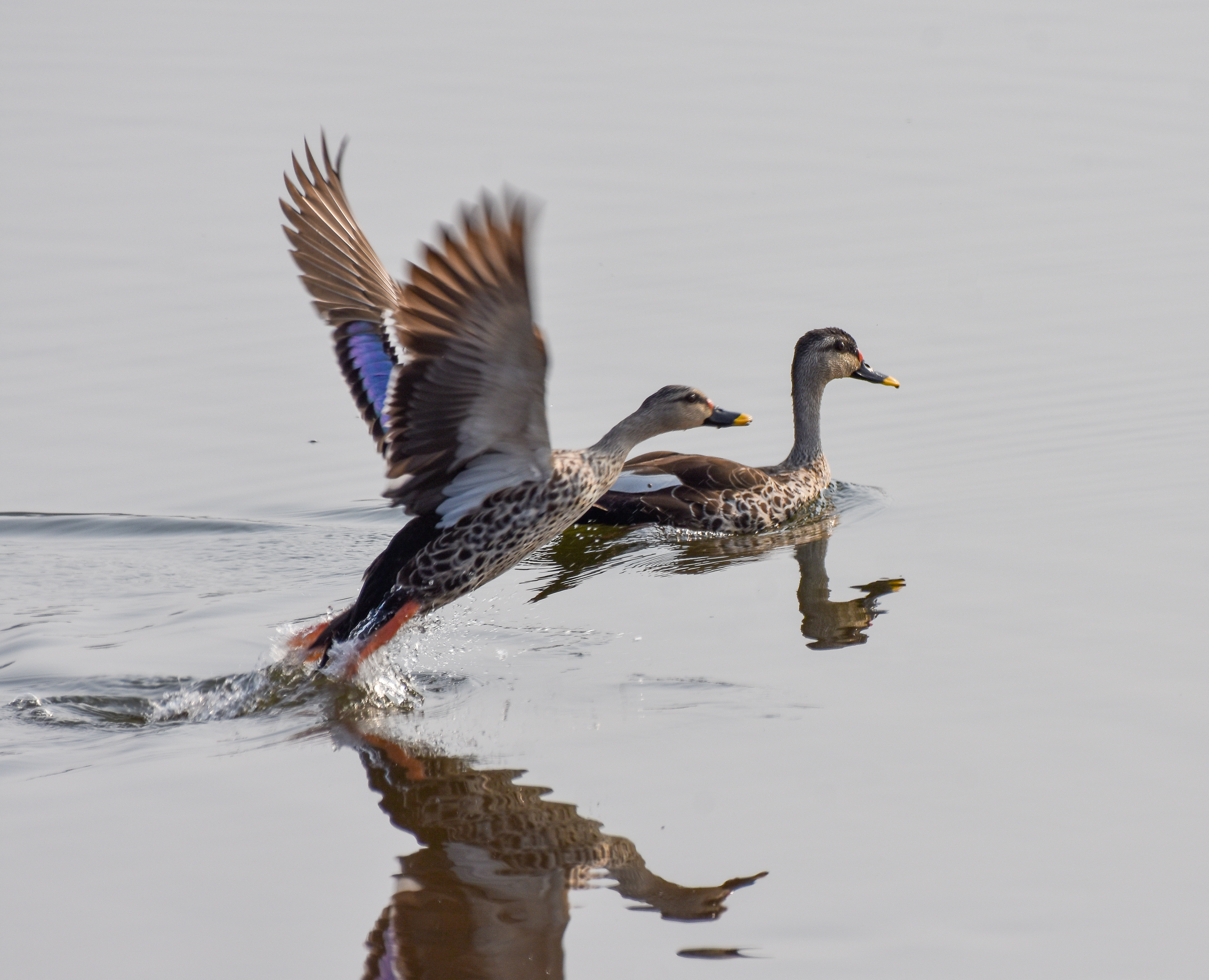
Indian spot-billed ducks (Anas poecilorhyncha), April 2024

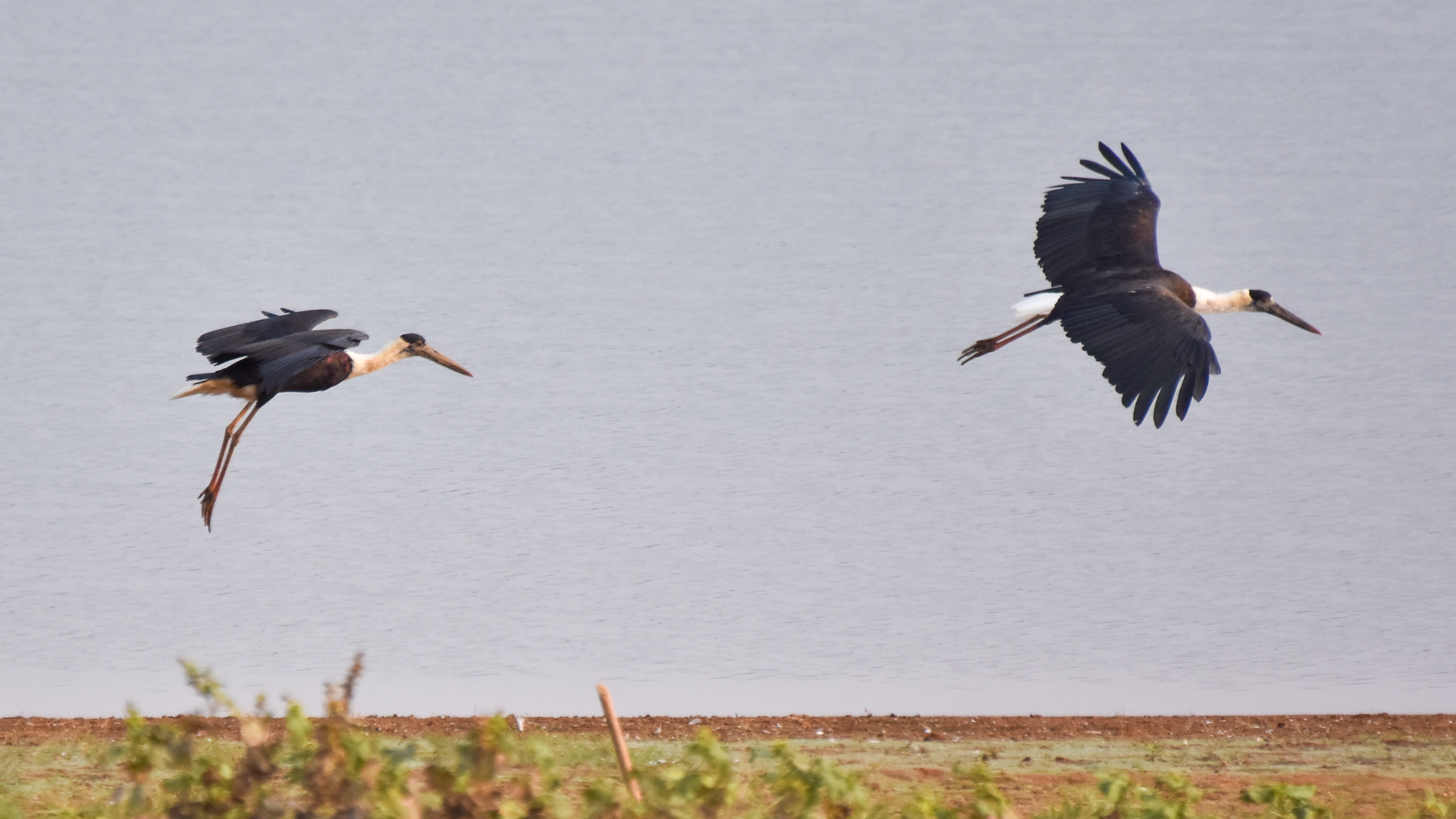
Asian woolly-necked storks (Ciconia episcopus) in flight, April 2024

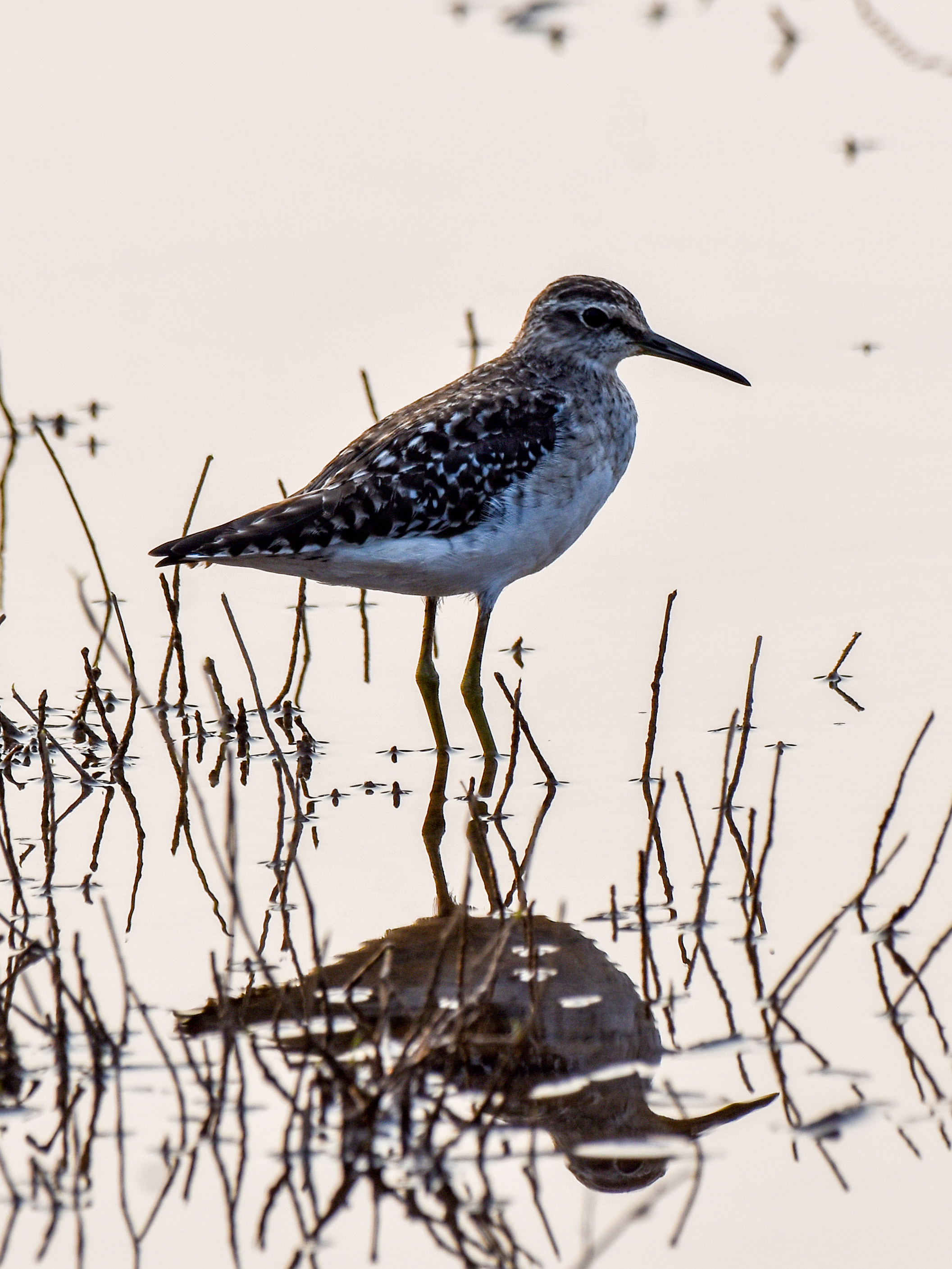
Wood sandpiper (Tringa glareola), April 2024
