= Lower Oder Valley National Park =

National Park on the German-Polish border

- Nationalpark Unteres Odertal
- IUCN category II (national park)
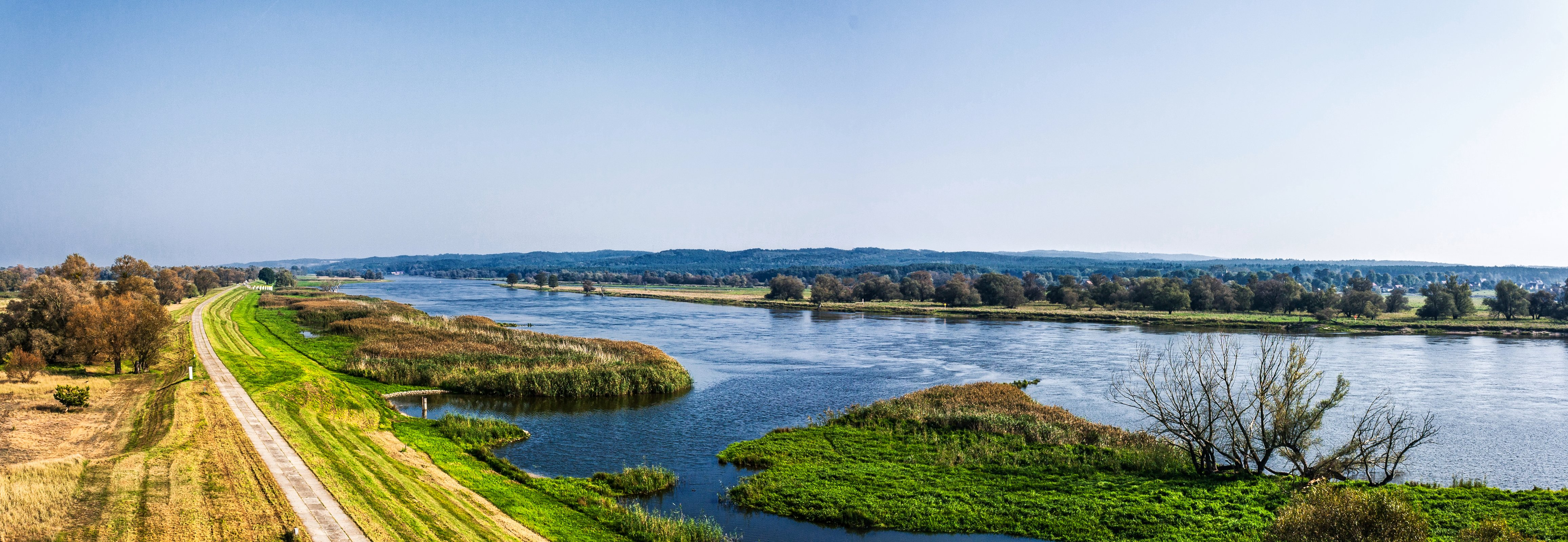
- View of the lower Oder valley from the observation tower Stützkow

- Location within Germany
- Location: Brandenburg, Germany
- Nearest city: Schwedt
- Coordinates: 53°03′0″N 14°16′0″E
- Area: 165 km^{2} (64 sq mi) Total; 105 km^{2} (41 sq mi) Germany; 60 km^{2} (23 sq mi) Poland
- Established: 1997
- Governing body: Nationalparkverwaltung Unteres Odertal; Park 2; 16303 Schwedt

The Lower Oder Valley International Park is a shared German-Polish nature reserve. It comprises the western banks of the Oder (Polish: Odra) river within the Uckermark district in the German state of Brandenburg as well as the steep eastern banks in the Gryfino and Police counties of the Polish West Pomeranian Voivodeship further north.

The German part of the core area is the Nationalpark Unteres Odertal (Lower Oder Valley National Park). There is an information centre at Criewen. The Polish part of the core area is the Park Krajobrazowy Dolina Dolnej Odry (Lower Odra Valley Landscape Park).

The area comprises 165 km^{2} (64 sq mi) (Germany 105 km^{2} (41 sq mi), Poland 60 km^{2} (23 sq mi)); together with adjoining nature reserves in Germany and Poland the total area is 1,172 km^{2} (453 sq mi). By decision of the German-Polish Environmental Council in 1992 the German, Polish and Brandenburg environment ministers as well as the voivode of Szczecin created the Lower Oder Valley International Park.

The flat western shore of the Oder features several levees, which in order to control the water level and to prevent highfloods are regularly opened in winter and spring. The water flows freely into extensive floodplains covered until April when the dikes are closed again and the remaining water is drained.

== Fauna ==
There is a Special Protection Area (SPA) for birds. These plains are habitats for birds such as the black stork, the aquatic warbler, and the corn crake. There are animals such as the European otter and the European beaver.

== Flora ==
There are plants like the submediterranean pubescent oak.

== Gallery ==
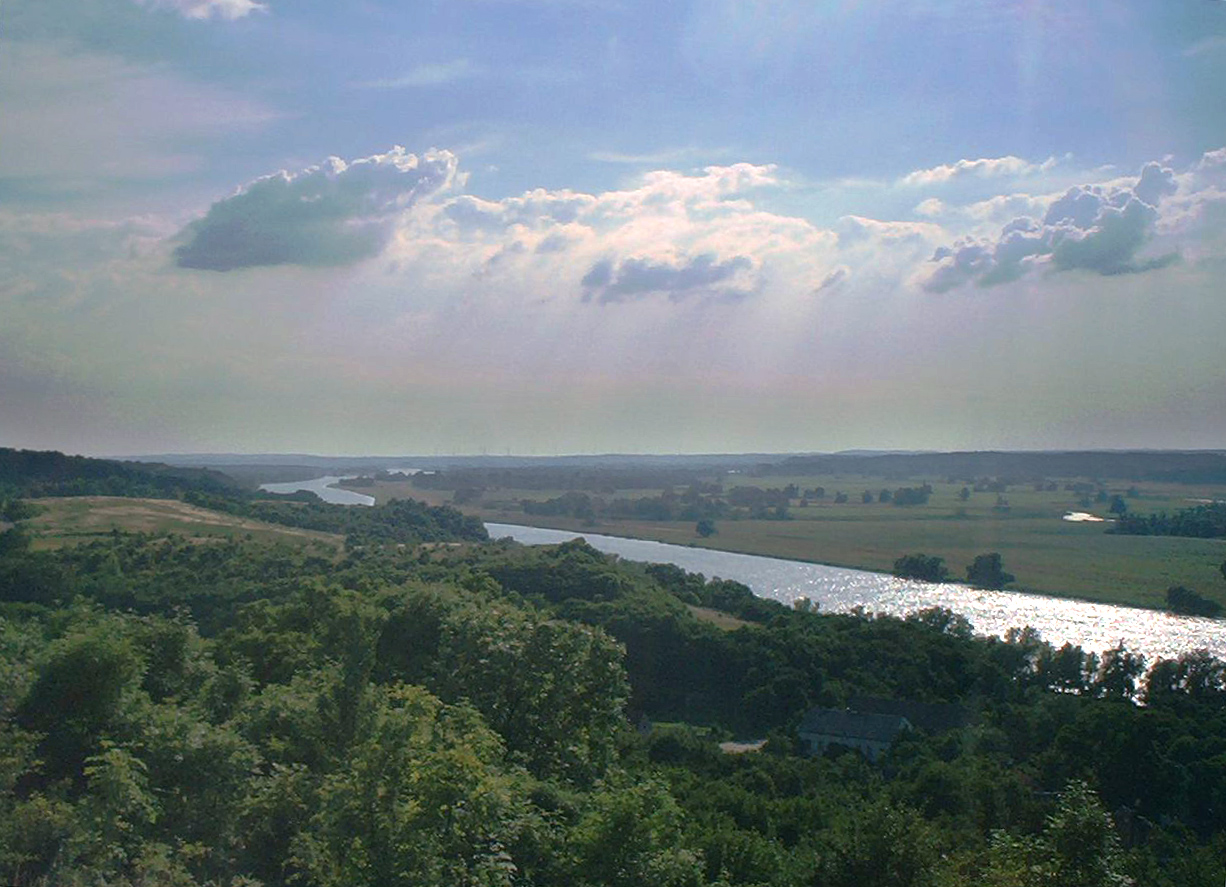
View from Krajnik Dolny on the Polish side of the border

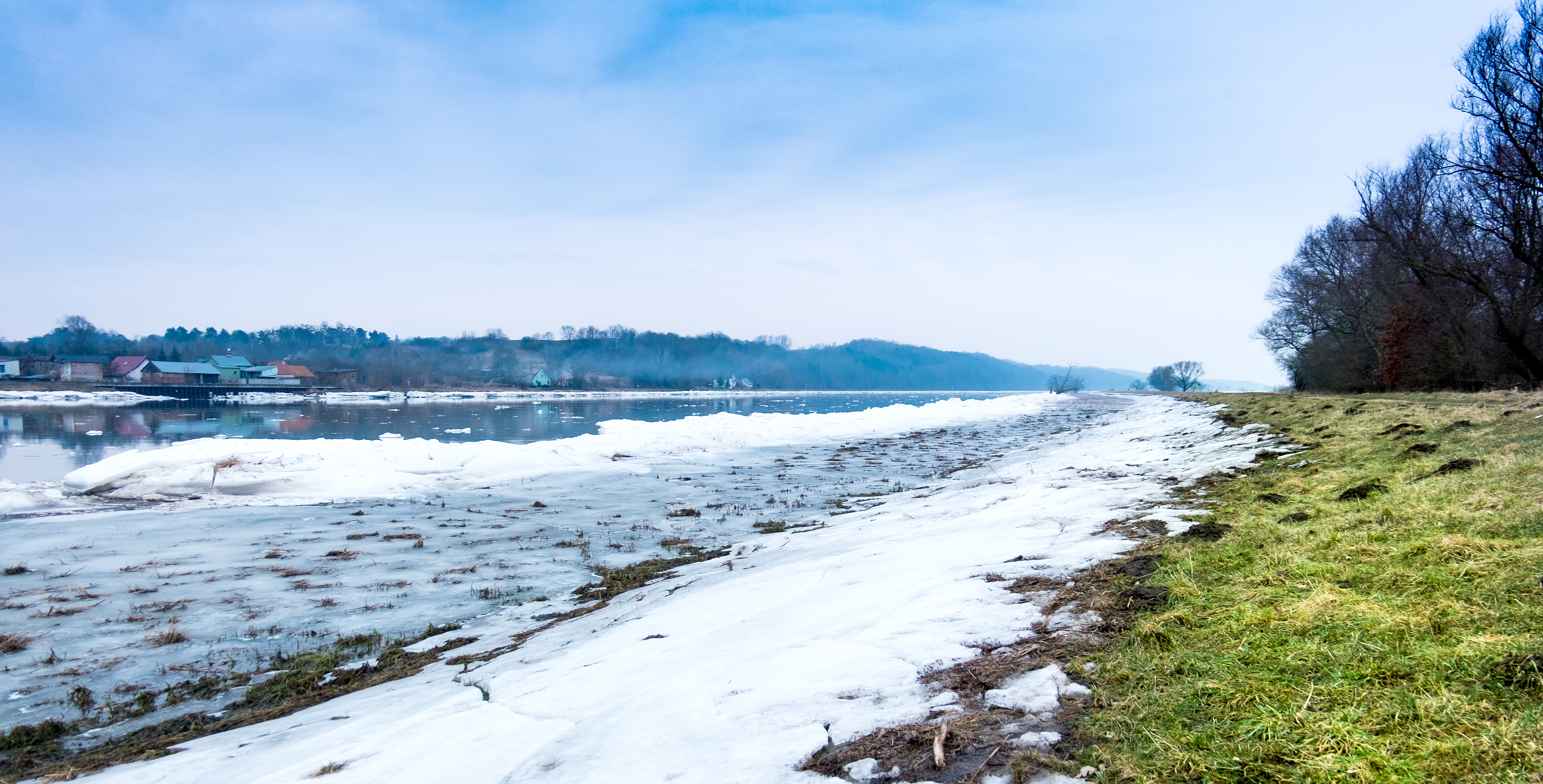
Winter on the River Oder near Krajnik Dolny

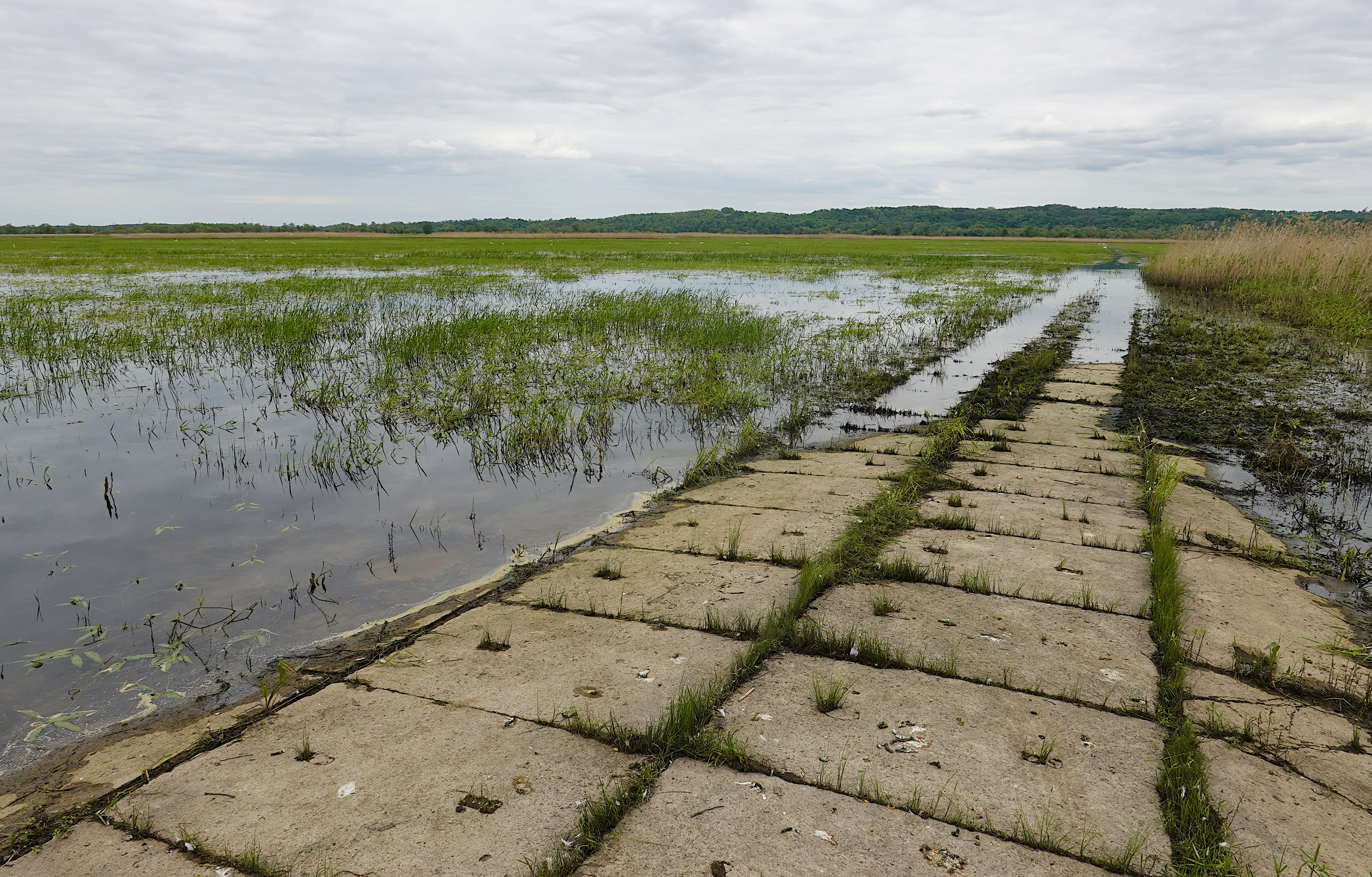
Concrete slab path in Lower Oder Valley National Park near Schwedt
