= Lower Oder Valley International Park =

- Międzynarodowy Park Dolina Dolnej Odry (Polish), Internationalpark Unteres Odertal (German)
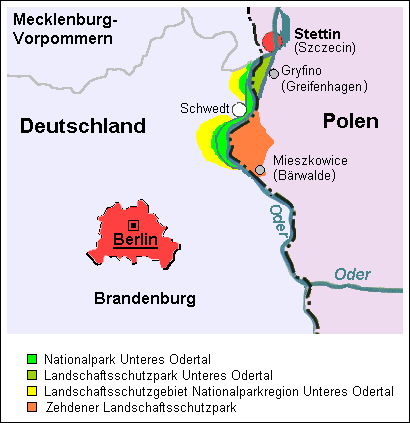
- Lower Oder Valley International Park; Germany (pale blue) & Poland (pale mauve) · Bright green: Lower Oder Valley National Park – German core area · Olive green: Lower Oder Valley Landscape Park – Polish core area · Yellow: Landscape Conservation Area Lower Oder Valley National Park Region – German non-core area · Orange: Cedynia Landscape Park – Polish non-core area

- Location within Europe
- Location: Lower Oder Valley, on the border between Germany and Poland
- Nearest city: Schwedt (Germany), Gryfino (Poland)
- Coordinates: 53°12′30″N 14°24′9″E
- Area: 1,173 km^{2} (453 sq mi)
- Established: 1992

The Lower Oder Valley International Park is a shared German-Polish nature reserve. It comprises the western banks of the Oder river within the Uckermark district in the German state of Brandenburg as well as the steep eastern banks in the Gryfino and Police counties of the Polish West Pomeranian Voivodeship further north.

The German part of the core area is the Nationalpark Unteres Odertal (Lower Oder Valley National Park). There is an information centre at Criewen. The Polish part of the core area is the Park Krajobrazowy Dolina Dolnej Odry (Lower Oder Valley Landscape Park).

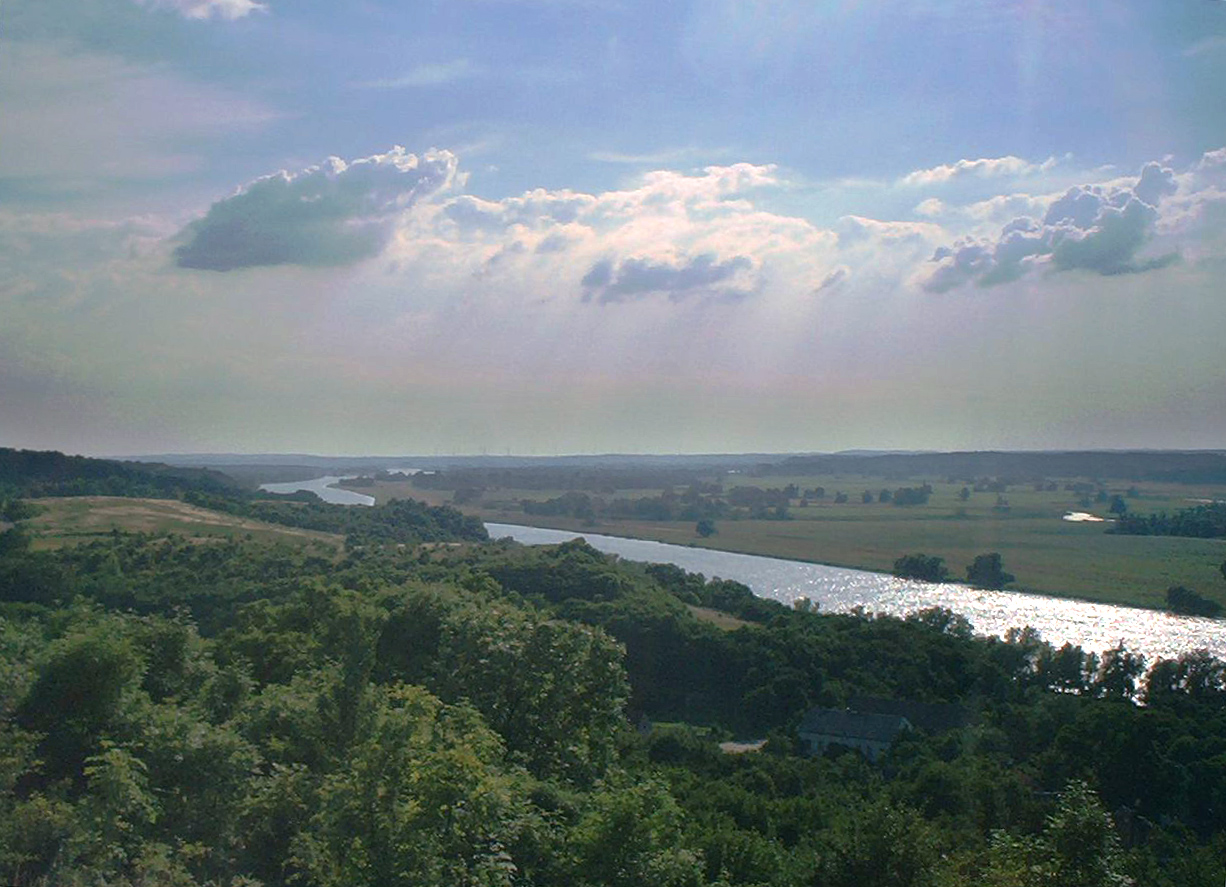
View from Krajnik Dolny on the Polish side of the border

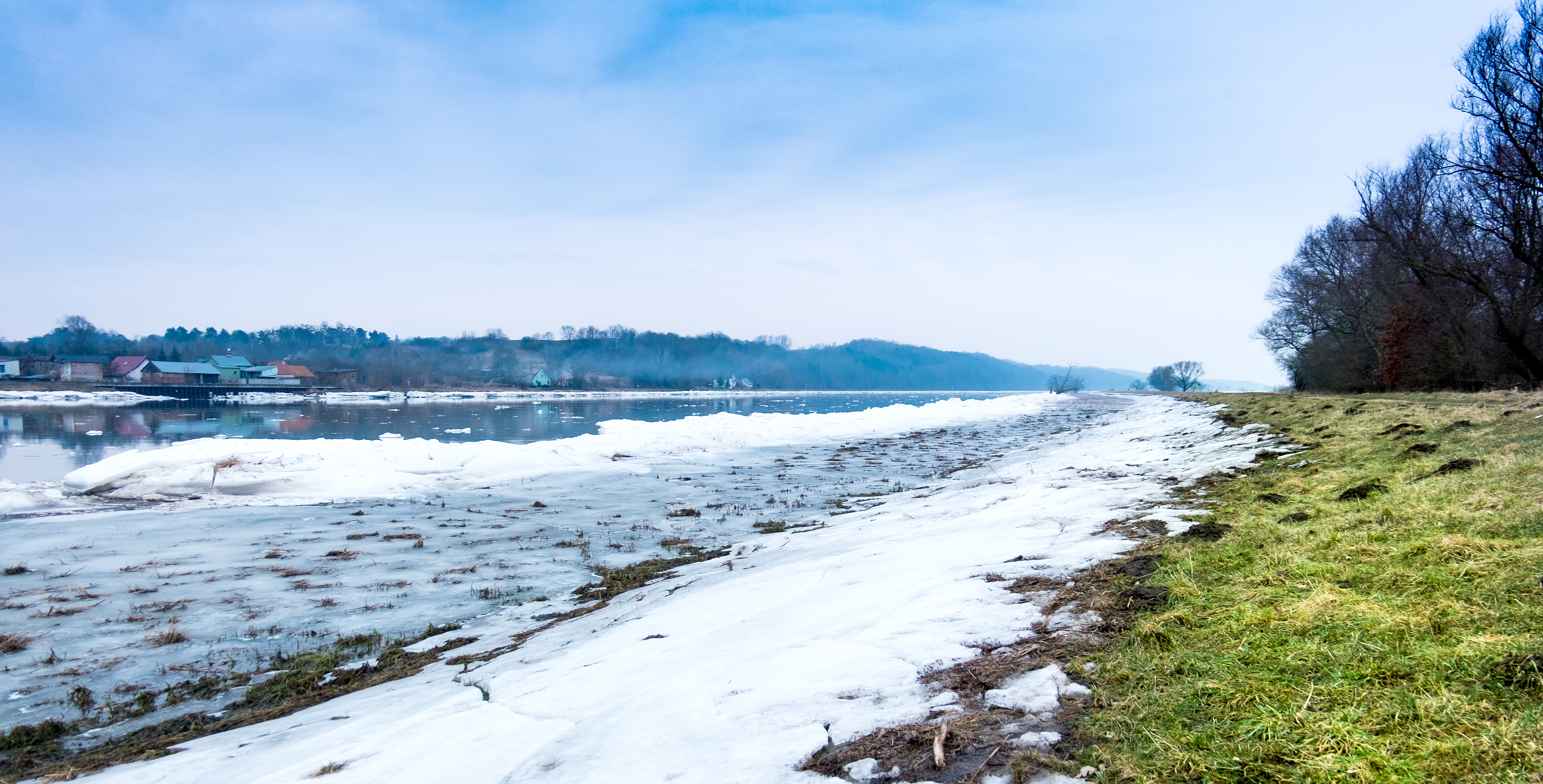
Winter on the river Oder near Krajnik Dolny

The area comprises 165 km^{2} (64 sq mi) (Germany 105 km^{2} (41 sq mi), Poland 60 km^{2} (23 sq mi)); together with adjoining nature reserves in Germany and Poland the total area is 1,173 km^{2} (453 sq mi). By decision of the German-Polish Environmental Council in 1992 the German, Polish and Brandenburg environment ministers as well as the voivode of Szczecin created the Lower Oder Valley International Park.

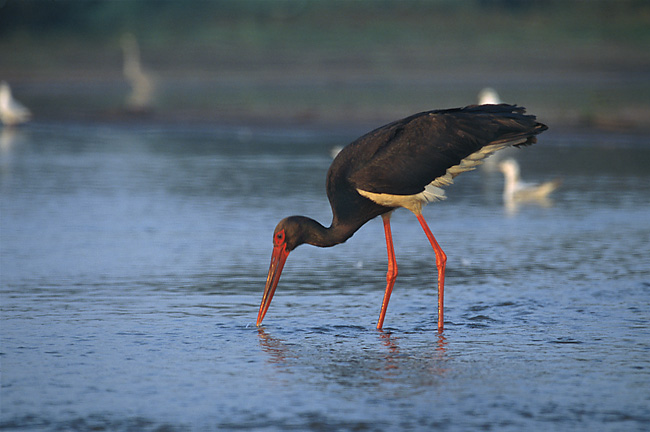
Black stork

The flat western shore of the Oder features several levees, which in order to control the water level and to prevent high floods are regularly opened in winter and spring. The water flows freely into extensive floodplains covered until April when the dikes are closed again and the remaining water is drained.

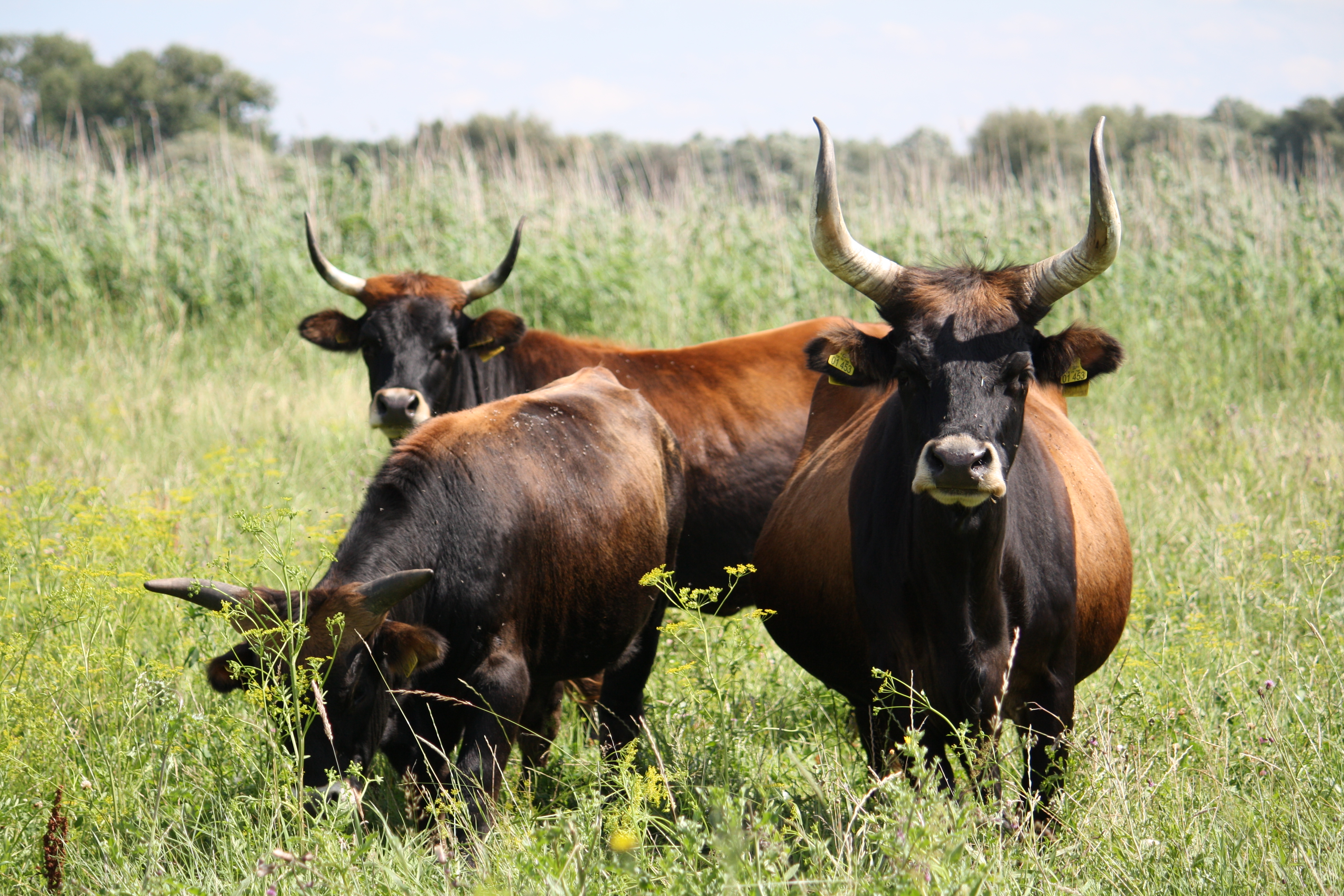
Conservation grazing with Taurus cattle near Stolzenhagen

== Fauna ==
There is a Special Protection Area (SPA) for birds. These plains are habitats for birds such as the black stork, the aquatic warbler, and the corn crake. There are animals such as the European otter and the European beaver.

== Flora ==
There are plants like the submediterranean pubescent oak.

== Fines and penalties ==
The police are allowed to collect fines (Verwarnungsgeld) for most minor traffic offenses on the spot. If you don't have enough cash on hand, you can usually pay with a credit/debit card. If you are unable or unwilling to pay (you have the legal right to do so), your vehicle may be impounded (at additional cost to you), although in most cases you will probably be issued a citation to appear in court later.
