= Lower Oder Valley Landscape Park =

Protected area in Poland

- Park Krajobrazowy Dolina Dolnej Odry
- IUCN category V (protected landscape/seascape)
- Interactive map of Lower Oder Valley Landscape Park
- Location: West Pomeranian Voivodeship
- Nearest city: Gryfino
- Coordinates: 53°16′N 14°28′E
- Area: 71.49 km^{2} (27.60 sq mi)
- Established: 1993

Lower Oder Valley Landscape Park (Park Krajobrazowy Dolina Dolnej Odry) is a designated Polish Landscape Park protected area, located in West Pomeranian Voivodeship of northwestern Poland.

== Geography ==
The Landscape Park is on the eastern banks of the river Oder which marks the Polish-German border.

The Park lies within West Pomeranian Voivodeship, in:

- Gryfino County — Gmina Gryfino and Gmina Widuchowa
- Police County — Gmina Kołbaskowo.

The Park is included in the Lower Oder River Valley Important Bird Area. It is also a Natura 2000 EU Special Protection Area.

=== Lower Oder Valley International Park ===
The Landscape Park covers a core zone of 6.09 km^{2} and a buffer zone of 1.14 km^{2}. Together with the Lower Oder Valley National Park on the German side, the Lower Oder Valley Landscape Park makes up the core zone of Lower Oder Valley International Park.

== See also ==
- Landscape parks in Poland
- Important Bird Areas of Poland
- Natura 2000 in Poland
- Special Protection Areas in Poland
