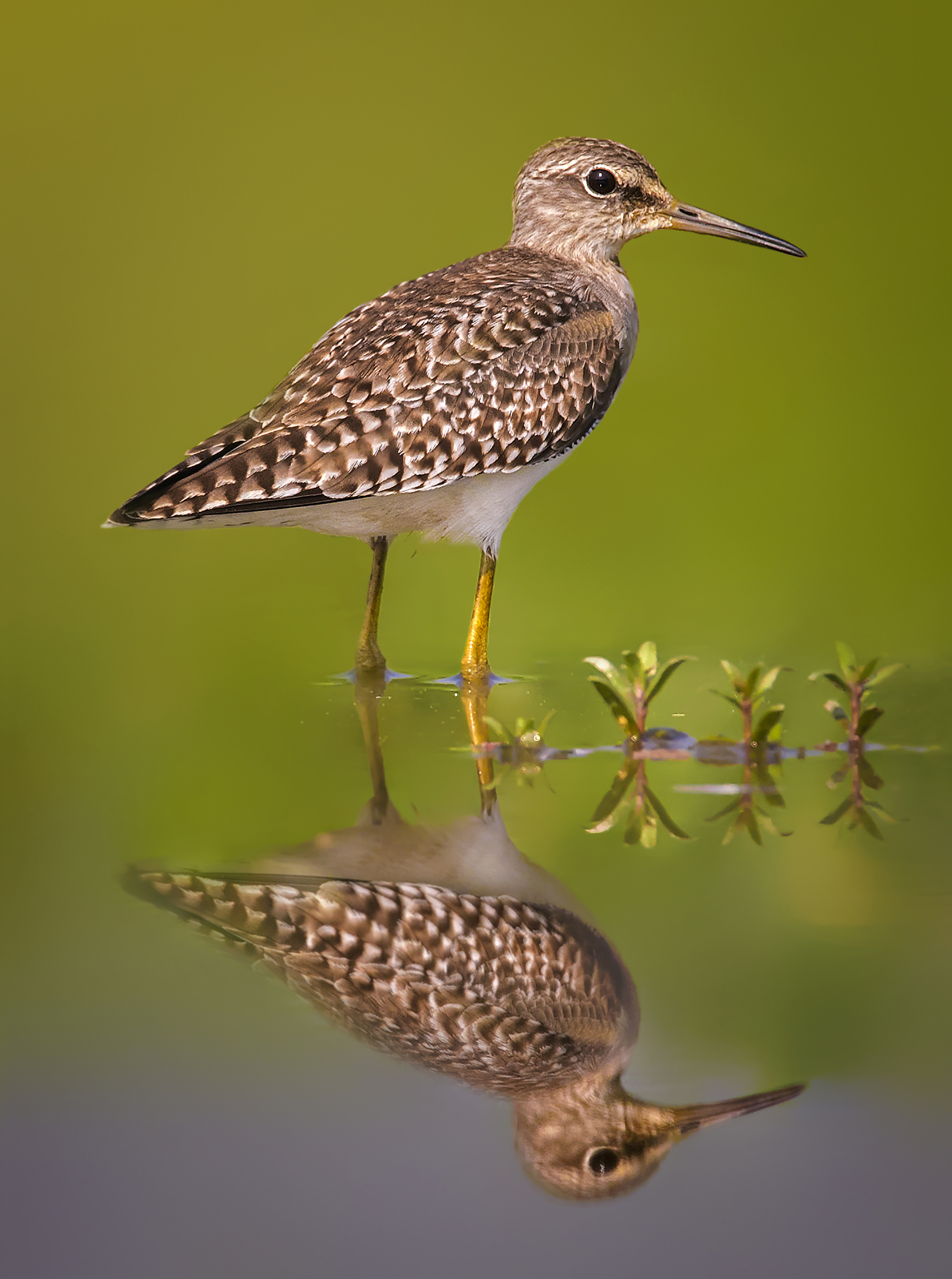
- Wood sandpiper in Bangabandhu Sheikh Mujib Safari Park, Gazipur City, Bangladesh
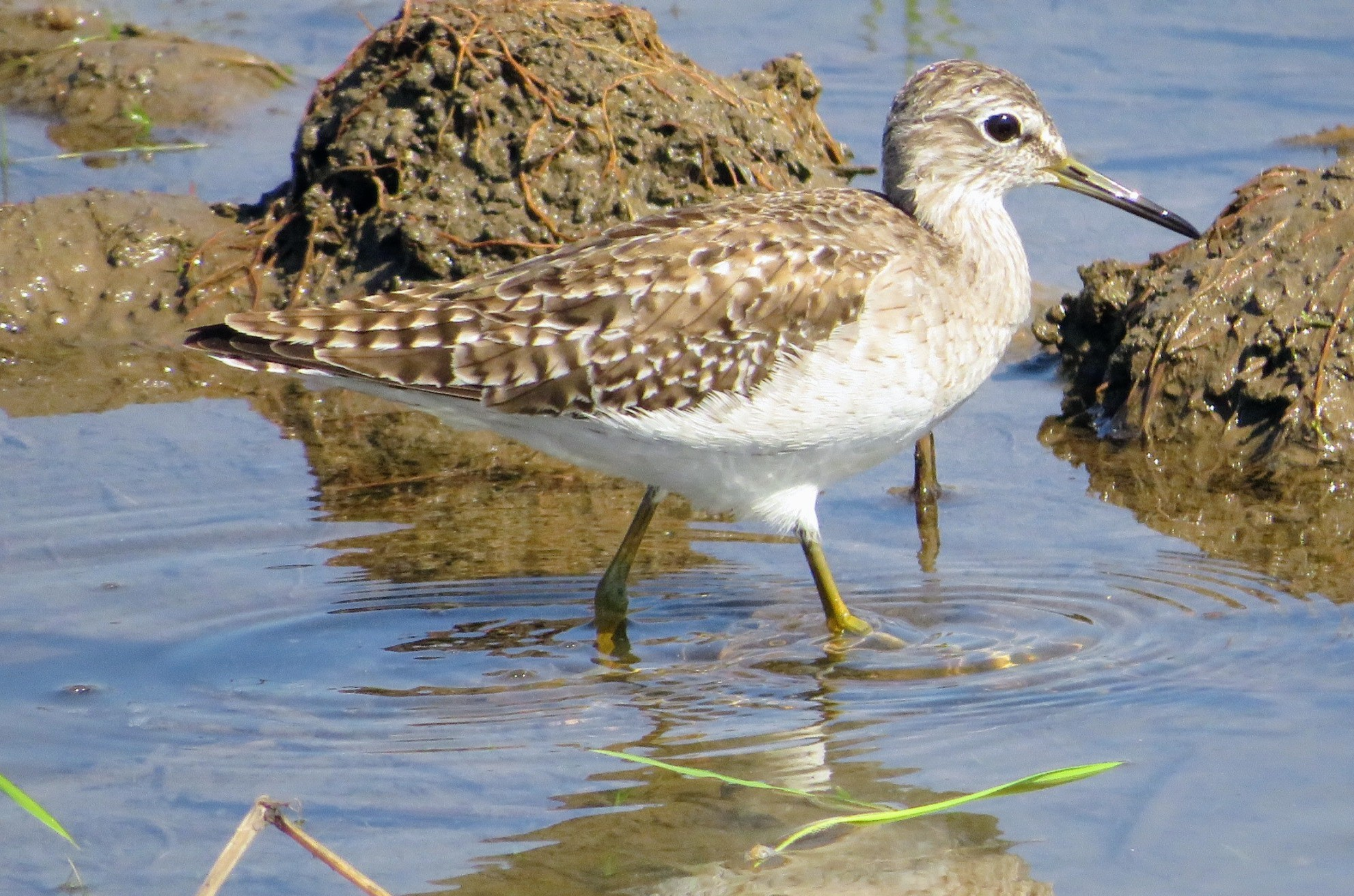
- At Timbi Lake, Vadodara, Gujarat, India

Conservation status
- Least Concern (IUCN 3.1)

Scientific classification
- Kingdom: Animalia
- Phylum: Chordata
- Class: Aves
- Order: Charadriiformes
- Family: Scolopacidae
- Genus: Tringa
- Species: T. glareola

Binomial name
- Tringa glareola Linnaeus, 1758

Synonyms
- Rhyacophilus glareola (Linnaeus, 1758)

= Wood sandpiper =

Species of bird

Tringa glareola

The wood sandpiper (Tringa glareola) is a small wader belonging to the sandpiper family Scolopacidae. A Eurasian species, it is the smallest of the shanks, a genus of mid-sized, long-legged waders that largely inhabit freshwater and wetland environments, as opposed to the maritime or coastal habitats of other, similar species.

== Taxonomy ==
The wood sandpiper was formally described in 1758 by the Swedish naturalist Carl Linnaeus in the tenth edition of his Systema Naturae under the current binomial name Tringa glareola. Linnaeus cited his own Fauna Svecica that had been published in 1746. He specified the type locality as Europe but it is now restricted to Sweden. The species is considered to be monotypic: no subspecies are recognised. The genus name, Tringa, is the Neo-Latin name given to the green sandpiper (Tringa ochropus) in 1599 by Aldrovandus, based on the Ancient Greek trungas, a "thrush-sized, white-rumped, tail-bobbing" wading bird mentioned by Aristotle. The specific glareola is from the Latin glarea, meaning "gravel".

== Description ==
The wood sandpiper resembles a longer-legged, more delicate form of the aforementioned green sandpiper (T. ochropus), or a solitary sandpiper (T. solitaria), albeit with a shorter, finer bill, brown back and longer yellowish legs. The wood sandpiper differs from the green by having a smaller, less contrasting white rump-patch, while the solitary sandpiper has no rump-patch, at all. However, the wood sandpiper is not closely related to these two species; its closest relative is the common redshank (T. totanus), with which it shares a sister relationship with the marsh sandpiper (T. stagnatilis). These three species are a group of smallish shanks with red or yellowish legs, displaying a breeding plumage of subdued, light-brown above (with some darker mottling), and a pattern of somewhat smaller, diffuse, brownish spots on the breast and neck.

== Distribution and habitat ==
The wood sandpiper breeds in subarctic wetlands, from the Scottish Highlands in the west, east across Eurasia and the Palearctic. They will migrate to Africa, South Asia (particularly India) and Australia. Vagrant birds have been seen as far into the Pacific as the Hawaiian Islands. In Micronesia, it is a regular visitor to Palau and the Mariana Islands, where flocks of up to 32 birds have been reported; it is observed and recorded on Kwajalein, Marshall Islands, approximately once each decade. The wood sandpiper is also encountered in the Western Pacific region of East Asia and some Western Pacific islands between mid-October and mid-May. A slight westward-expansion saw the establishment of a small resident breeding population in Scotland, beginning in the 1950s. This species is usually found in and around freshwater habitats during migration and wintering.

== Behaviour and ecology ==
Mature wood sandpipers moult all of their primary feathers between August and December, whilst juvenile birds shed a varying number of outer primaries between December and April, much closer to their departure from Africa. Immature birds are also much more flexible than older birds regarding the timing (and rate) of their moult and refueling. Adults and immatures which accumulate fuel loads of c.50% of their lean body mass can potentially cross distances of 2397–4490 km in one non-stop flight.

=== Breeding ===
The wood sandpiper nests primarily on the ground, or will re-use an abandoned tree nest of another bird species, such as the fieldfare (Turdus pilaris). Four pale-green eggs are laid between March and May. These are incubated by both sexes beginning with the last egg. They hatch after 22 to 23 days. They are initially cared for by both parents but the female normally departs after a few days. The young can feed themselves. The young fledge when aged around 30 days.

=== Food and feeding ===
They forage for invertebrates by probing their bills in shallow water or into wet mud, such as lakeshores or riverbanks, and mainly eat aquatic insects, crustaceans, arthropods, various worms, and other small prey.

== Conservation status ==
The wood sandpiper is one of the species to which the Agreement on the Conservation of African-Eurasian Migratory Waterbirds (AEWA) applies. With an apparently stable, healthy global population, it is considered a Species of Least Concern, as per the IUCN.

juvenile, Latvia

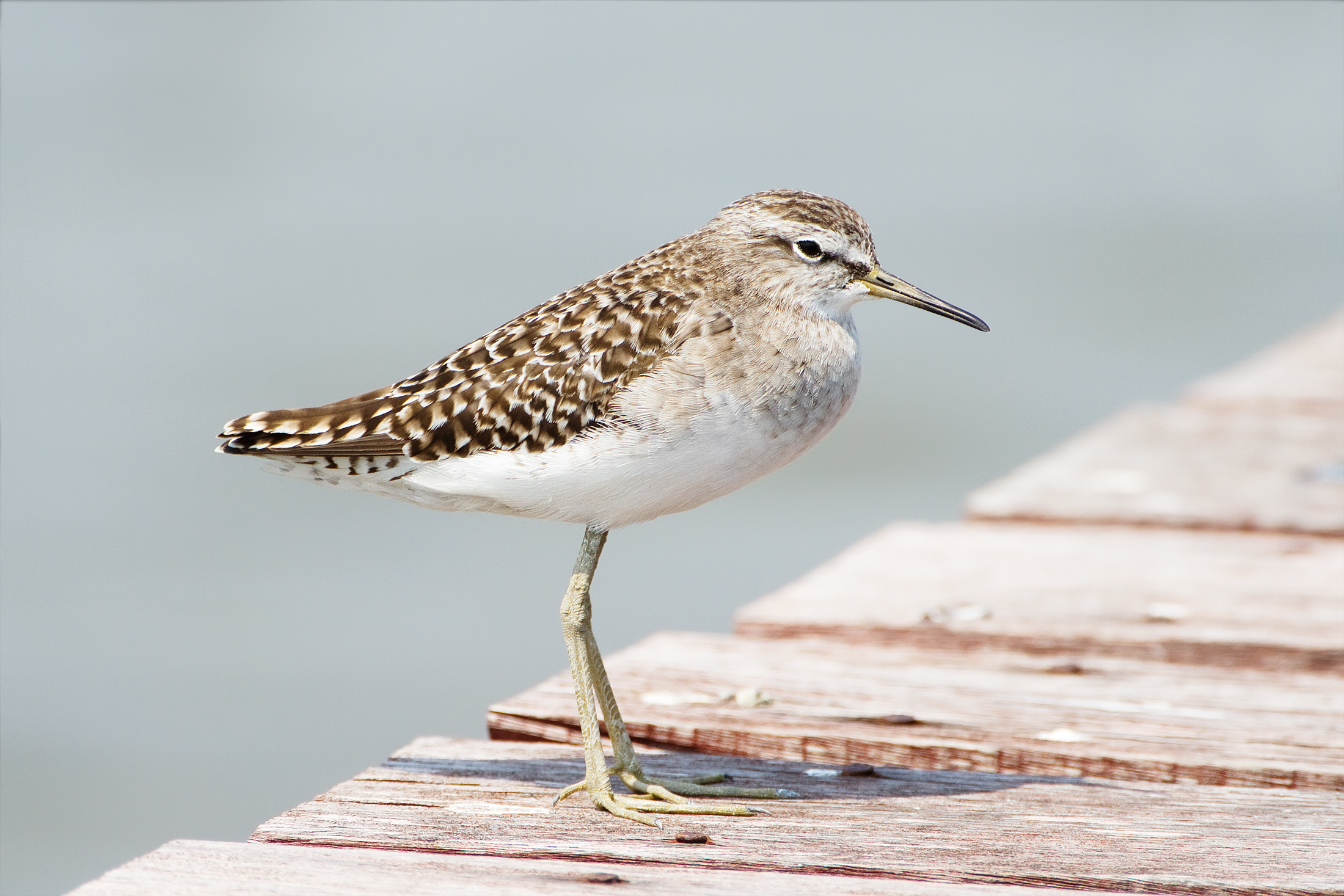
Non-breeding plumage; Laem Phak Bia, Thailand

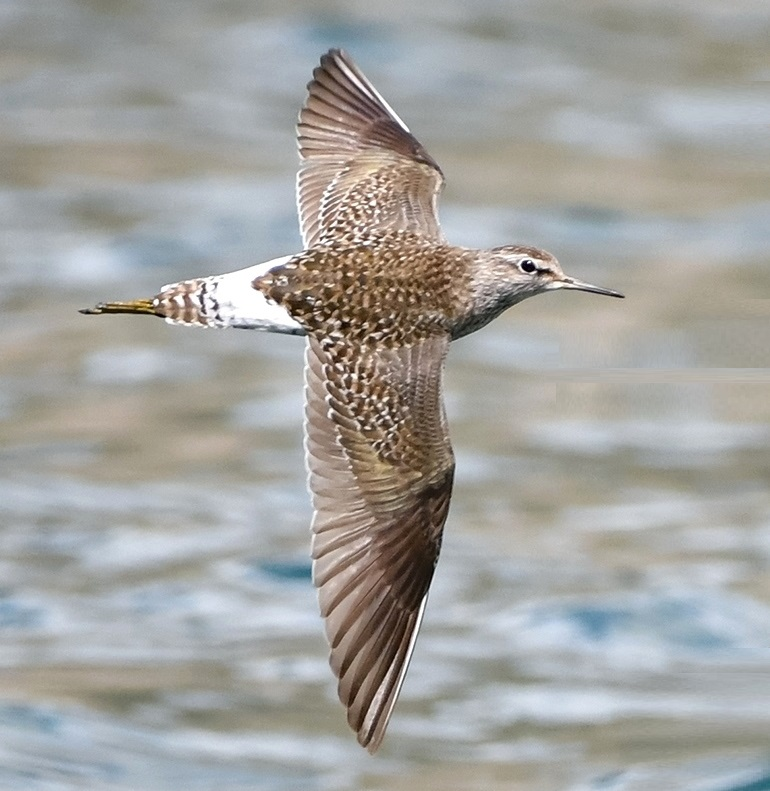
In flight in Pakistan

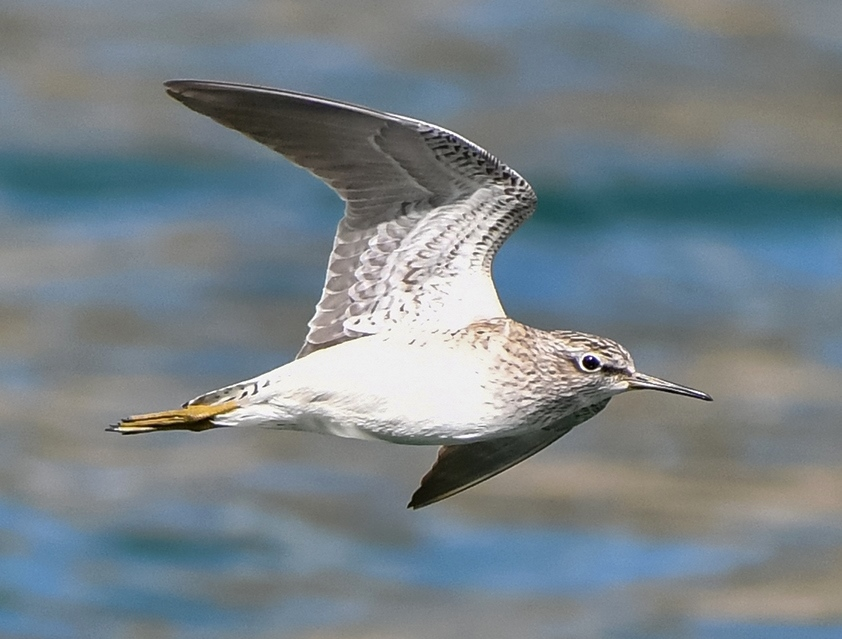
In flight in Pakistan

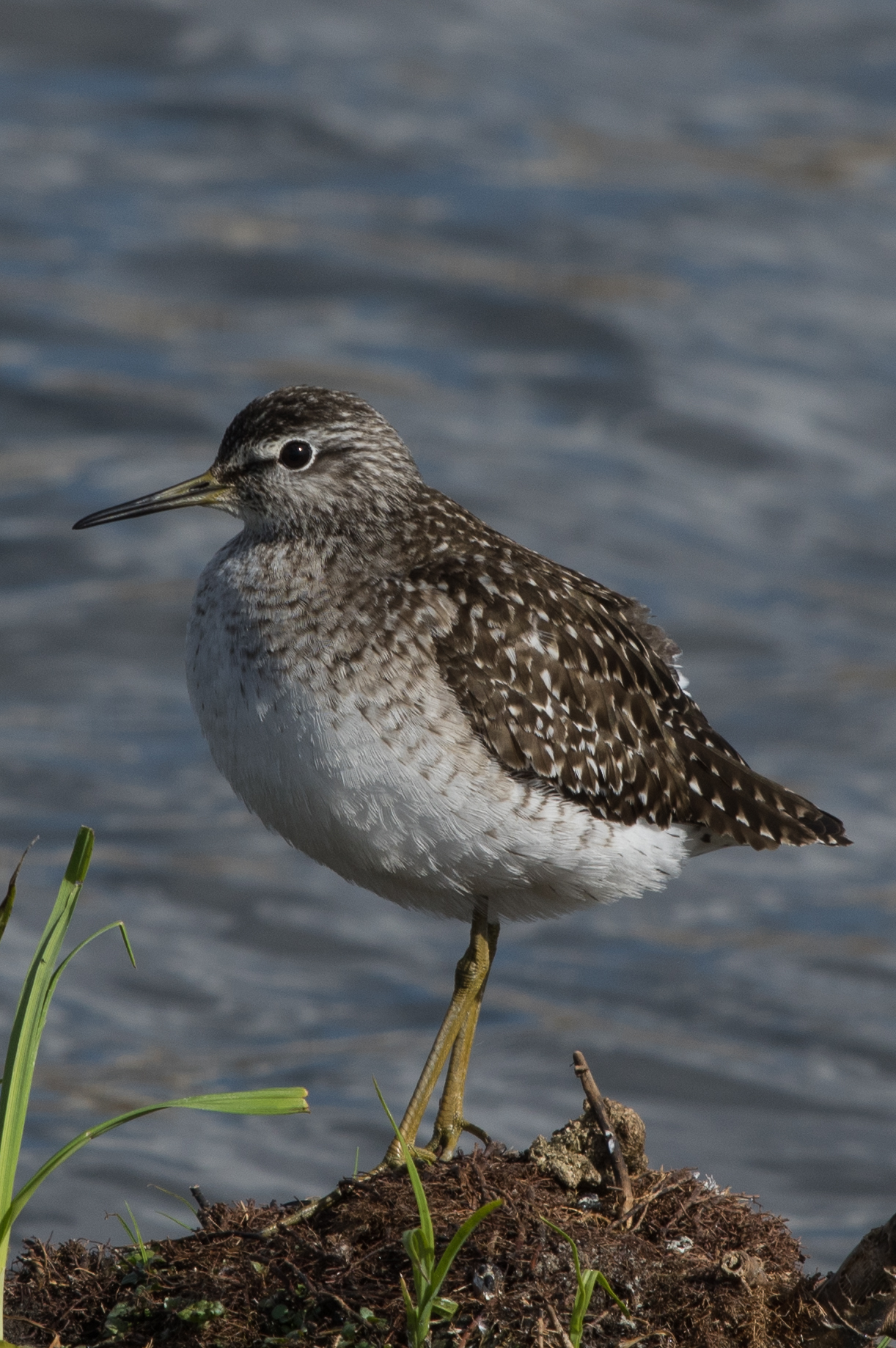
At Lower Oder Valley International Park, Germany/Poland

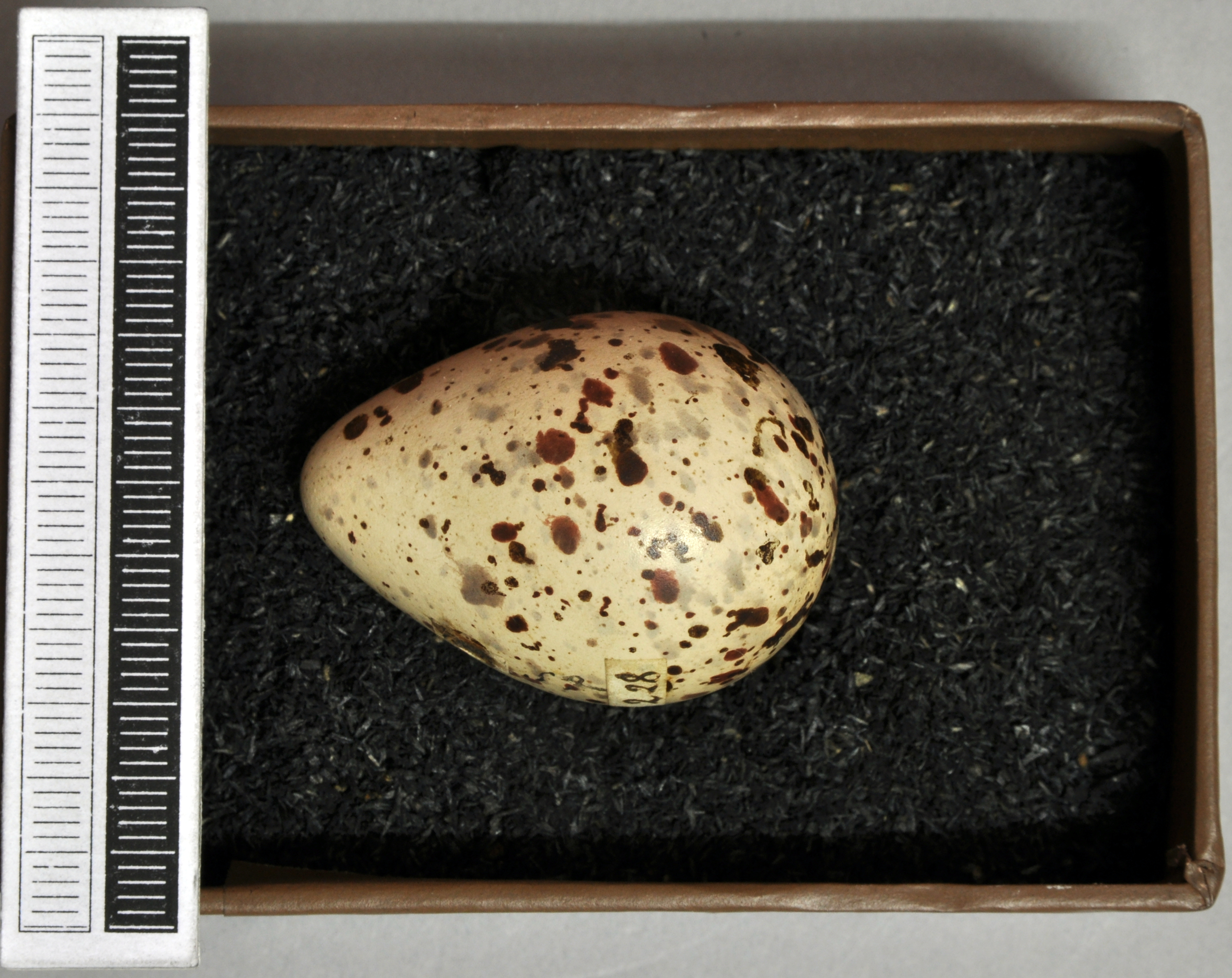
Egg, at Museum Wiesbaden

== Sources ==
- Cramp, Stanley, ed. (1983). "Tringa glareola Wood Sandpiper". Handbook of the Birds of Europe the Middle East and North Africa. The Birds of the Western Palearctic. Vol. III: Waders to Gulls. Oxford: Oxford University Press. pp. 577–587. ISBN 978-0-19-857506-1.
