= Kudige =

- village
- Interactive map of Kudige
- Coordinates: 13°03′N 75°11′E
- Country: India
- State: Karnataka
- District: Kodagu
- Talukas: kushalnagar

Government
  - Body: Gram panchayat

Area
  - Total: 2 km^{2} (0.77 sq mi)
- Elevation: 826 m (2,710 ft)

Population (2001)
  - Total: 5,529
  - Density: 2,800/km^{2} (7,200/sq mi)

Languages
  - Official: Kannada
- Time zone: UTC+5:30 (IST)
- Postal code: 571232
- ISO 3166 code: IN-KA
- Vehicle registration: KA 12
- Website: karnataka.gov.in

Kudige is a village in the southern state of Karnataka, India. It is located in the kushalnagar taluk of Kodagu district in Karnataka.

This is the place where river Harangi, joins Kaveri. "Kudige" literally means "Place of confluence". Kodagu receives much of its milk supply from Kudige Dairy. District Institute of Education and Training and Sainik school are also located here, making it a significant town in the district.

Kudige has grown to become a twin-town of Kushalnagar with industries at its outskirts. The largest coffee curing works in India, with a capacity of 20,000 metric tonnes owned by Tata Coffee is located in Kudige.

== Demographics ==
As of 2001 India census, Kudige had a population of 5529 with 2733 males and 2796 females.

== See also ==
- Kodagu
- Mangalore
- Districts of Karnataka
