= Krajnik Dolny =

- Village
- Location within Poland
- Coordinates: 53°1′55″N 14°18′51″E
- Country: Poland
- Voivodeship: West Pomeranian
- County: Gryfino
- Gmina: Chojna

Krajnik Dolny [ˈkrai̯nik ˈdɔlnɨ] (German: Niederkränig) is a village in the administrative district of Gmina Chojna, within Gryfino County, West Pomeranian Voivodeship, in north-western Poland, close to the German border. It lies approximately 10 km (6 mi) north-west of Chojna, 27 km (17 mi) south-west of Gryfino, and 47 km (29 mi) south-west of the regional capital Szczecin.

For the history of the region, see History of Pomerania. The village is a border crossing with Germany.
