= Pomerania =

Historical region south of the Baltic Sea

Pomerania Pomorze (Polish) Pommern (German) Pòmòrskô (Kashubian)
- Historical region
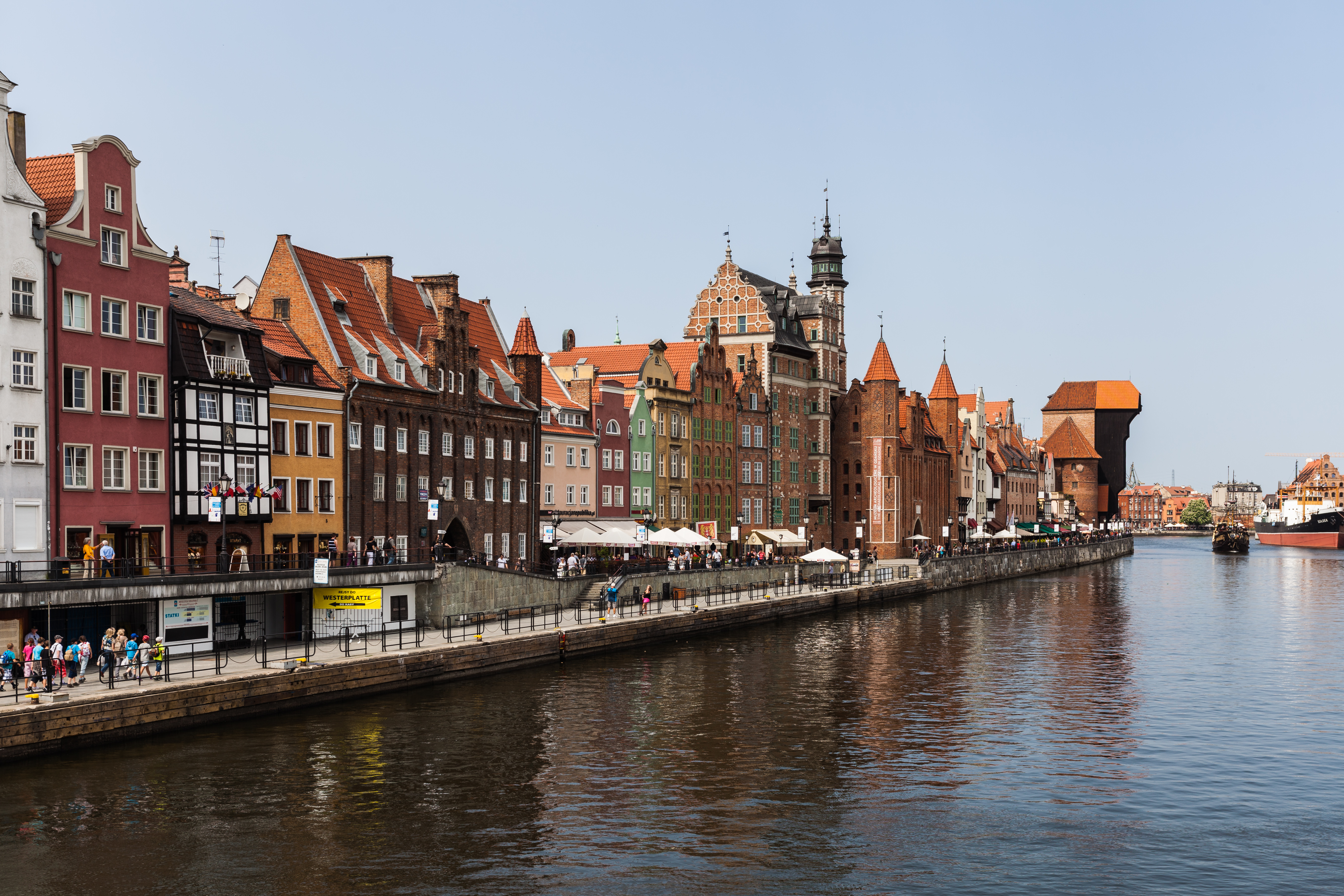
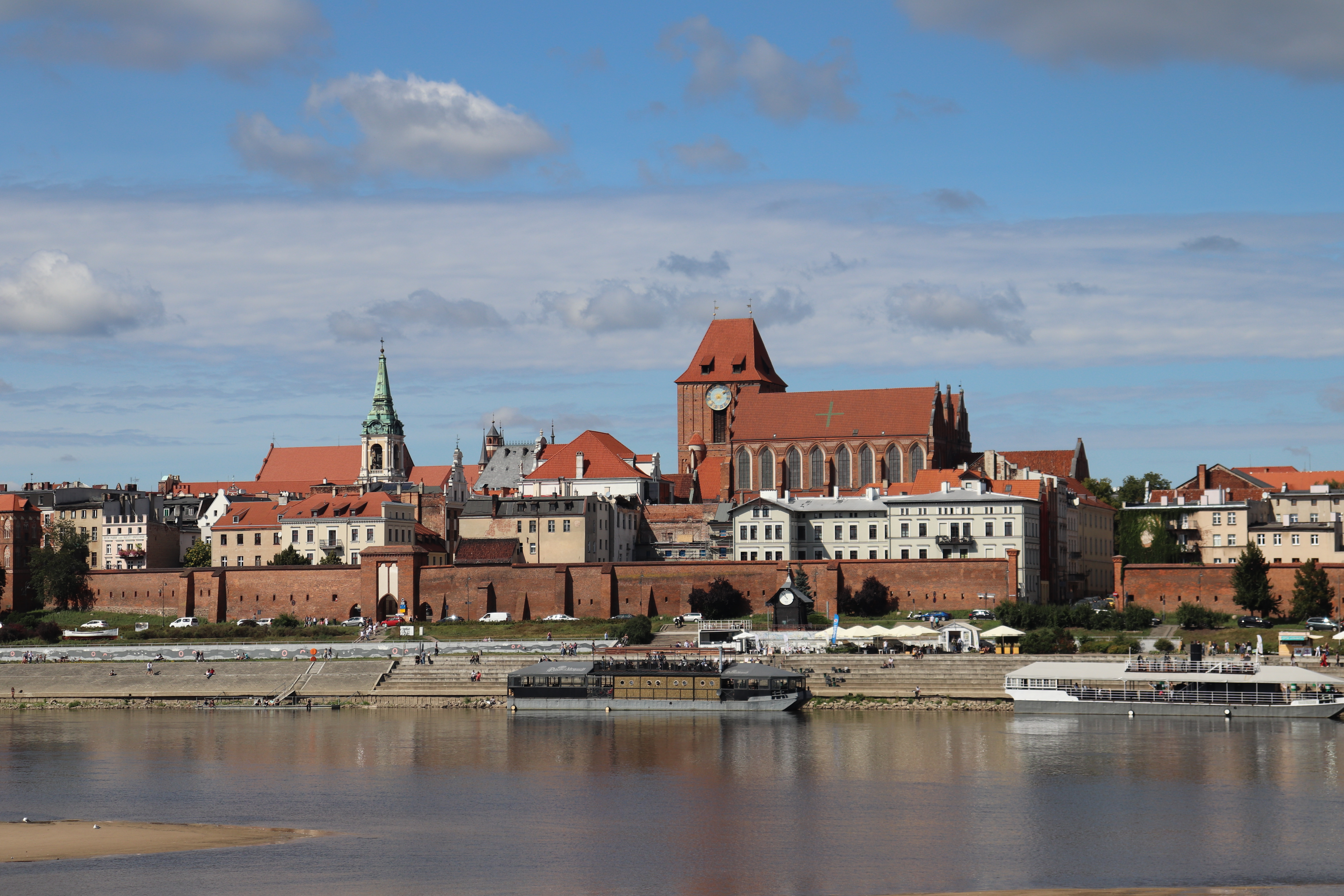
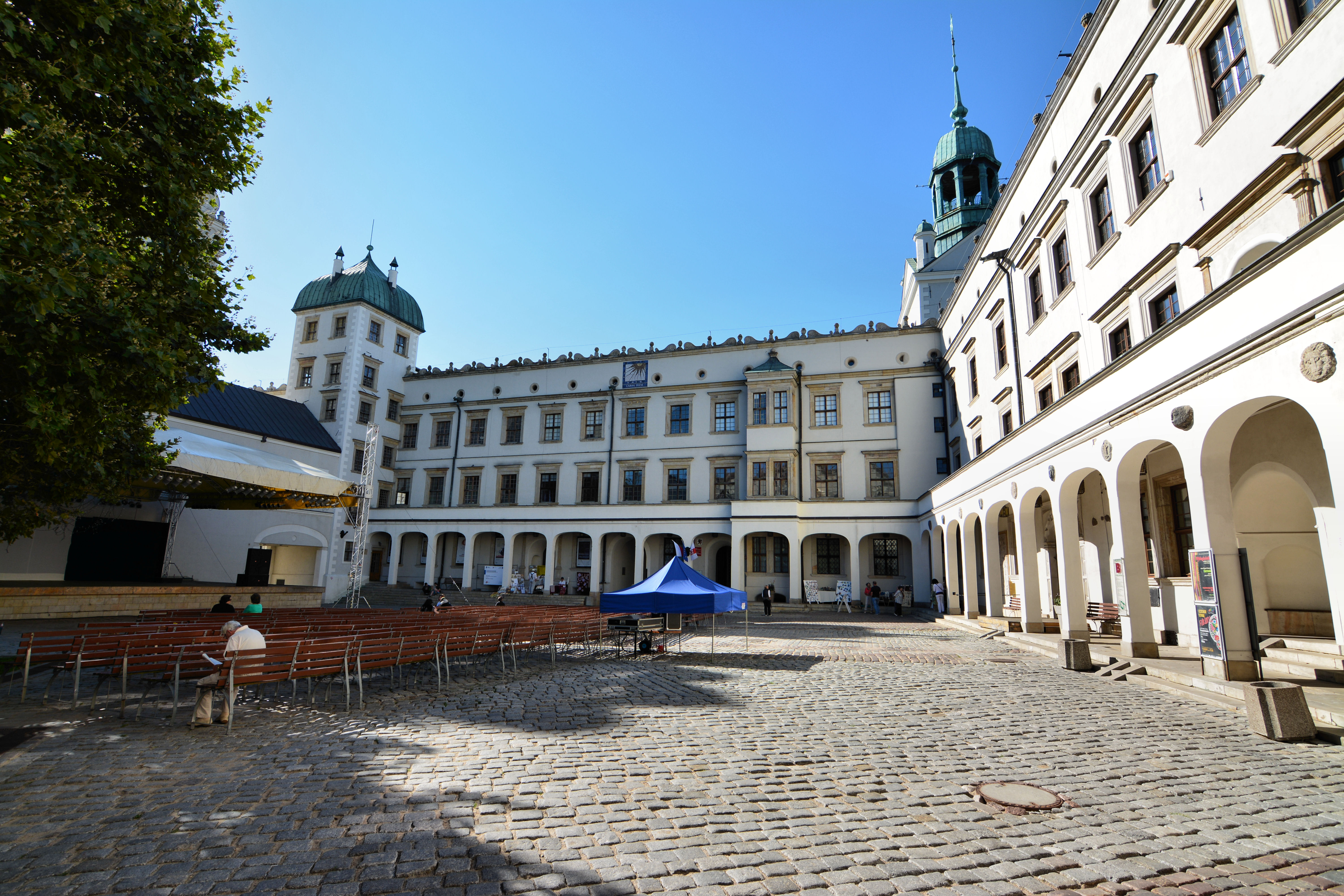
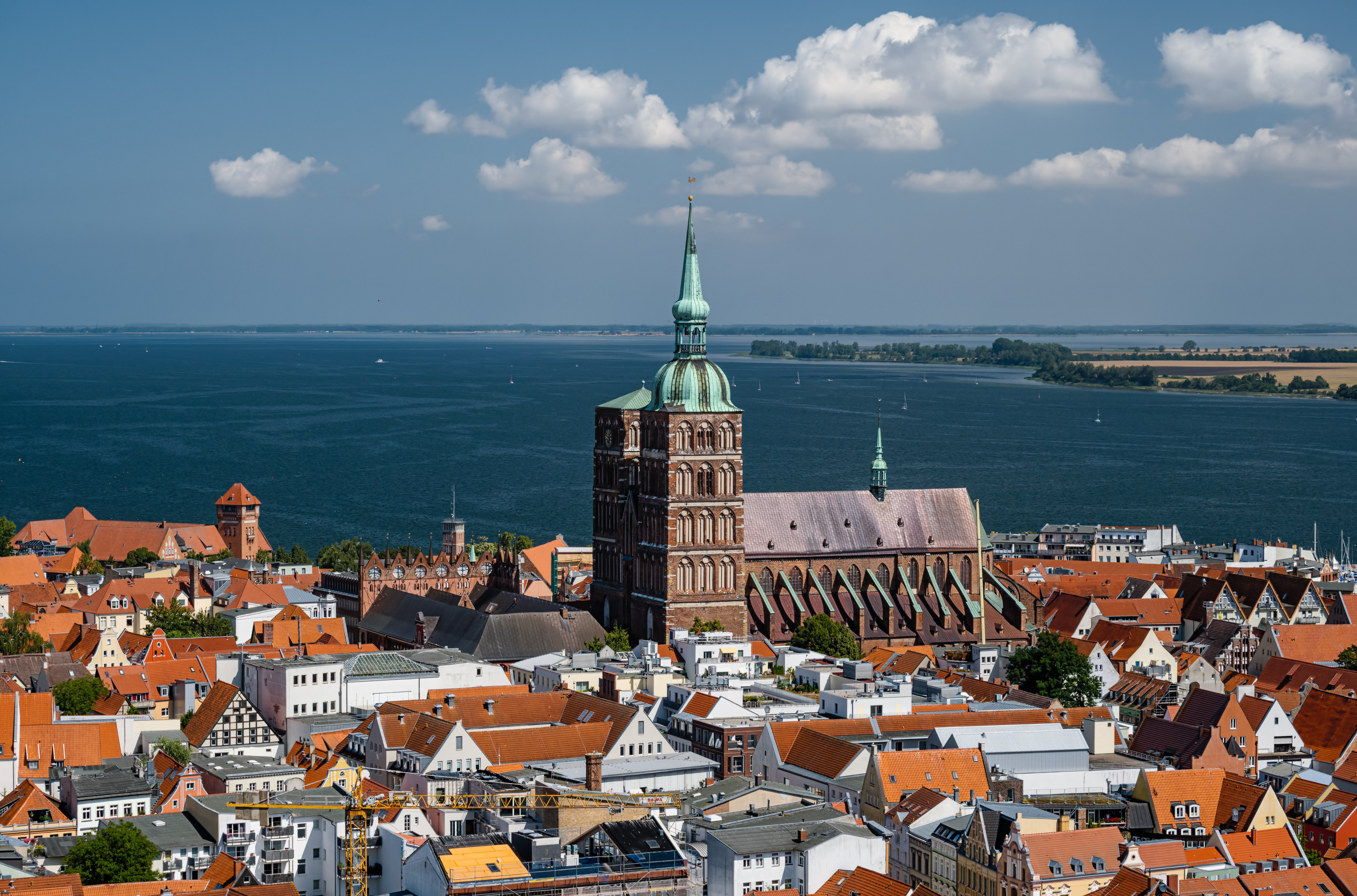
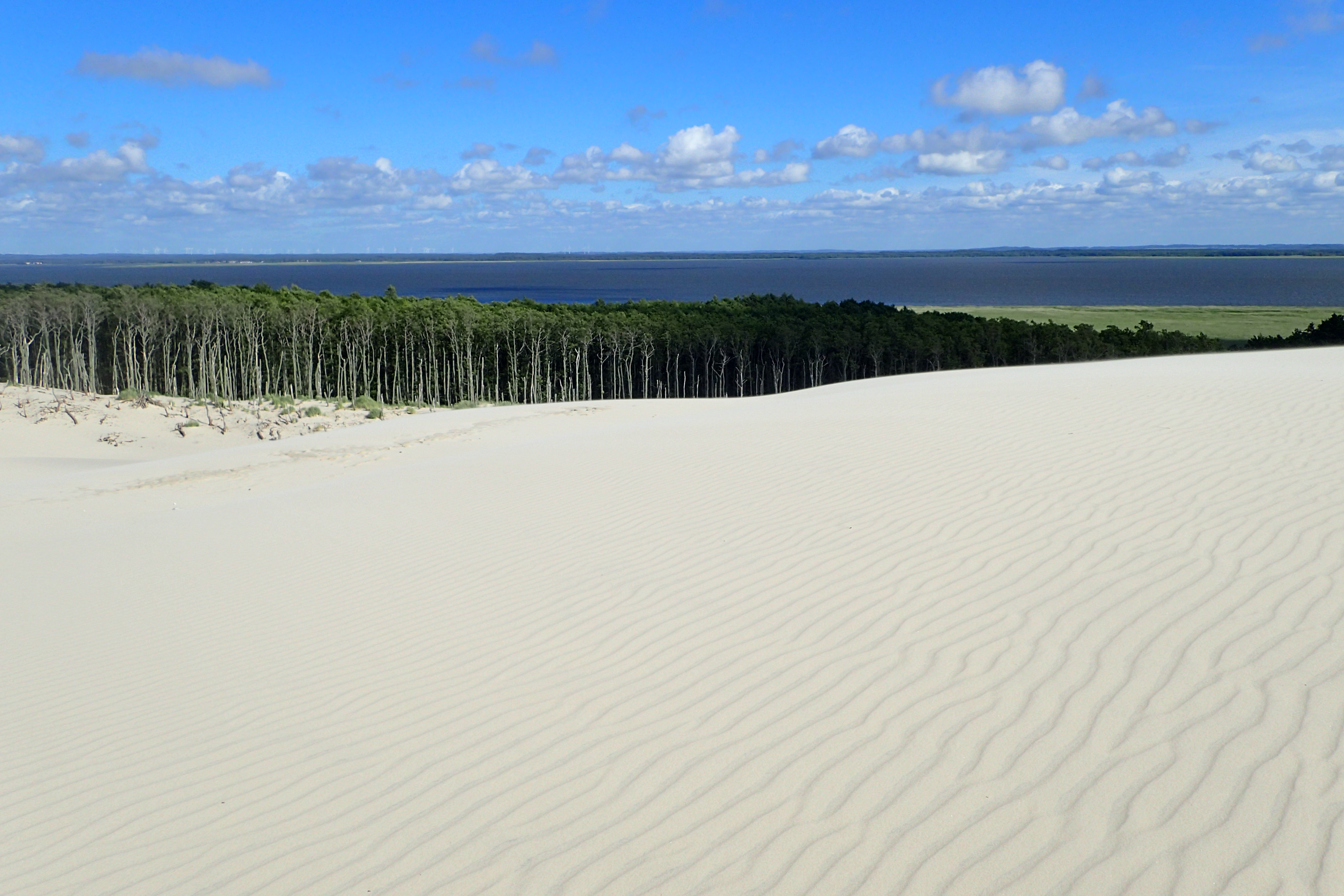
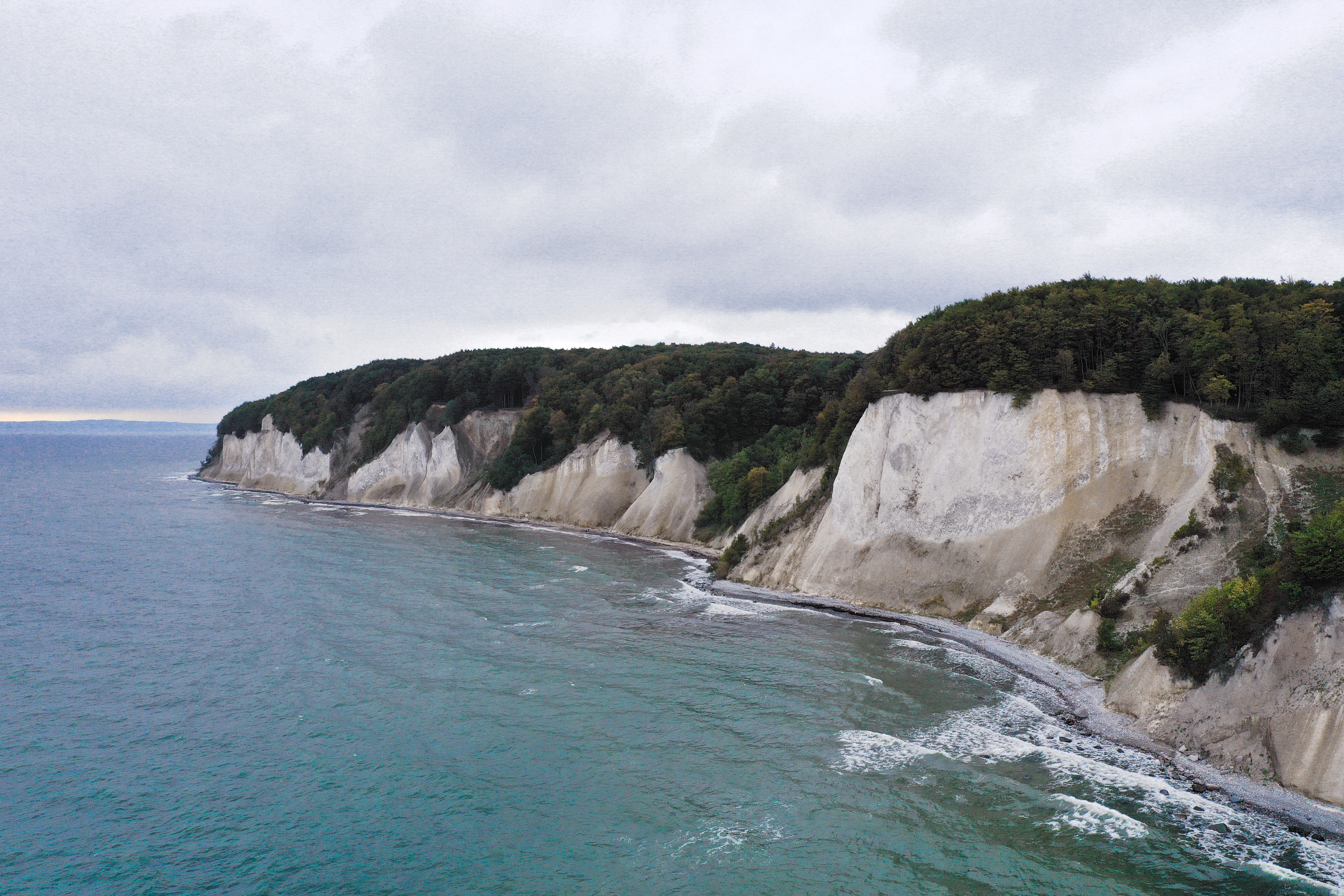
- Gdańsk historic center Toruń Old Town Ducal Castle, Szczecin Stralsund Old Town Dunes of Łeba, Slovincian National Park Chalk cliffs, Jasmund National Park

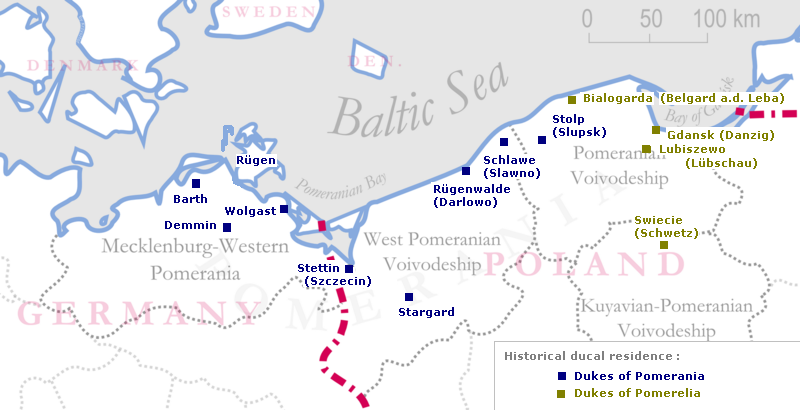
- Contemporary administrative units with Pomerania in the name, not representing the exact historical region, as they also include parts of other regions
- Coordinates: 54.29°N 18.15°E
- Countries: Poland; Germany
- Largest cities: in Poland: Gdańsk, Szczecin in Germany: Greifswald, Stralsund
- Demonym: Pomeranian
- Time zone: UTC+1 (CET)
  - Summer (DST): UTC+2 (CEST)
- Primary airports: Gdańsk Lech Wałęsa Airport; Solidarity Szczecin–Goleniów Airport

Pomerania (Polish: Pomorze [pɔˈmɔʐɛ]; German: Pommern [ˈpɔmɐn]; Kashubian: Pòmòrskô; Swedish: Pommern) is a historical region on the southern shore of the Baltic Sea in Central Europe, split between Poland and Germany. The central and eastern part belongs to the West Pomeranian, Pomeranian and Kuyavian-Pomeranian voivodeships of Poland, while the western part belongs to the German states of Mecklenburg-Western Pomerania and Brandenburg.

Pomerania's historical border in the west is the Mecklenburg-Western Pomeranian border Urstromtal, (Note: The border valley is formed by the rivers Landgraben, Tollense, Trebel, Recknitz and Randow) which now constitutes the border between the Mecklenburgian and Pomeranian part of Mecklenburg-Western Pomerania, while it is bounded by the Vistula River in the east. The easternmost part of Pomerania is alternatively known as Pomerelia, consisting of four sub-regions: Kashubia inhabited by ethnic Kashubians, Kociewie, Tuchola Forest and Chełmno Land.

Pomerania has a relatively low population density, with its largest cities being Gdańsk and Szczecin. Outside its urban areas, it is characterized by farmland, dotted with numerous lakes, forests, and small towns. In the west of Pomerania lie several islands, the largest of which are Rügen, the largest island in Germany; Usedom/Uznam, and Wolin, the largest island in Poland. The region has a rich and complicated political and demographic history at the intersection of several cultures.

The name Pomerania (po more) is of Slavic origin and means "land by the sea".

== Geography ==
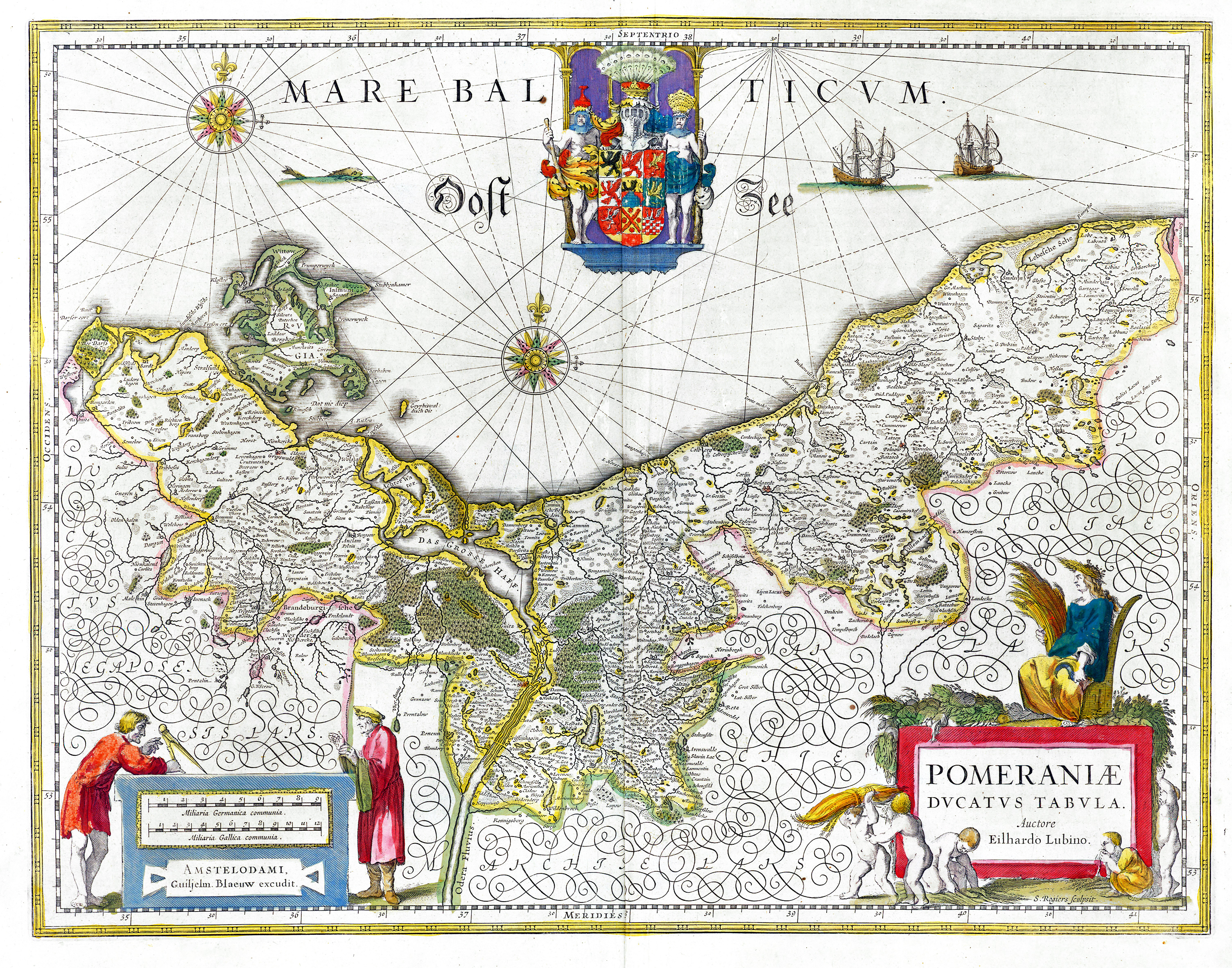
17th-century map of the Duchy of Pomerania

=== Borders ===
Pomerania is the area along the Bay of Pomerania of the Baltic Sea between the rivers Recknitz, Trebel, Tollense and Augraben in the west and Vistula in the east. It formerly reached perhaps as far south as the Noteć river, but since the 13th century its southern boundary has been placed further north.

=== Landscape ===
Physical map of the Province of Pomerania in 1905

Most of the region is coastal lowland, being part of the Central European Plain. Its southern, hilly parts belong to the Baltic Ridge, a belt of terminal moraines formed during the Pleistocene. Within this ridge, a chain of moraine-dammed lakes constitutes the Pomeranian Lake District. The soil is generally rather poor, sometimes sandy or marshy.

The western coastline is jagged, with many peninsulas (such as Darß–Zingst) and islands (including Rügen, Usedom, and Wolin) enclosing numerous bays (Bodden) and lagoons (the biggest being the Lagoon of Szczecin).

The eastern coastline is smooth. Łebsko and several other lakes were formerly bays, but have been cut off from the sea. The easternmost coastline along the Gdańsk Bay (with the Bay of Puck) and Vistula Lagoon, has the Hel Peninsula and the Vistula peninsula jutting out into the Baltic.

=== Subregions ===
The Pomeranian region has the following administrative divisions:

- Western Pomerania (Vorpommern) in northeastern Germany, stretching from the Recknitz river to the Germany–Poland border. This region is part of the federal state of Mecklenburg-Western Pomerania. The southernmost part of historical Western Pomerania (the Gartz area) is now in Brandenburg, while its historical eastern parts (the Oder estuary) are now in Poland. Western Pomerania comprises the historical regions inhabited by Western Slavic tribes Rugians and Volinians, otherwise the Principality of Rügen and the County of Gützkow.
- The West Pomeranian Voivodeship (Zachodniopomorskie) in Poland, stretching from the Oder–Neisse line to the Wieprza river, encompassing most of historical Pomerania in the narrow sense (as well as small parts of historic Greater Poland and Lubusz Land).
- The Pomeranian Voivodeship, with similar borders to Pomerelia, stretching from the Wieprza river to the Vistula delta in the vicinity of Gdańsk.
- The northern half of the Kuyavian-Pomeranian Voivodeship, comprising most of Tuchola Forest and Chełmno Land.

The bulk of Farther Pomerania is included within the modern West Pomeranian Voivodeship, but its easternmost parts (the Słupsk area) now constitute the northwest of Pomeranian Voivodeship. Farther Pomerania in turn comprises several other historical subregions, most notably the former Principality of Cammin, the Nowogard County, and the Słupsk and Sławno Land. The Lębork and Bytów Land is considered a part of Pomerelia (Kashubia) by the Polish historiography, and of Farther Pomerania by the German historiography.

Parts of Pomerania and surrounding regions have constituted a euroregion since 1995. The Pomerania euroregion comprises Hither Pomerania and Uckermark in Germany, West Pomerania in Poland, and Scania in Sweden.

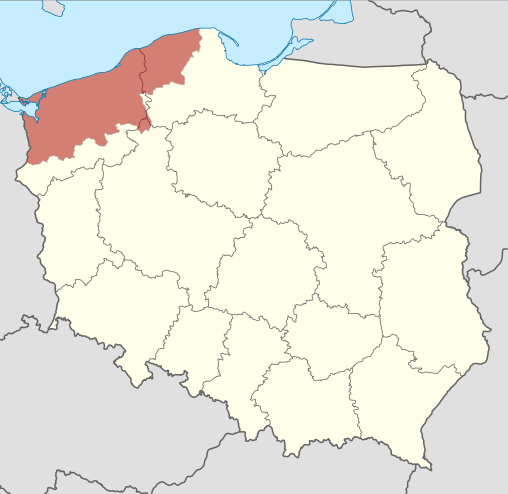
"Narrow Pomerania" or Western Pomerania in Poland

The German part of Pomerania

The border between Pomerania and Mecklenburg running through Mecklenburg-Vorpommern

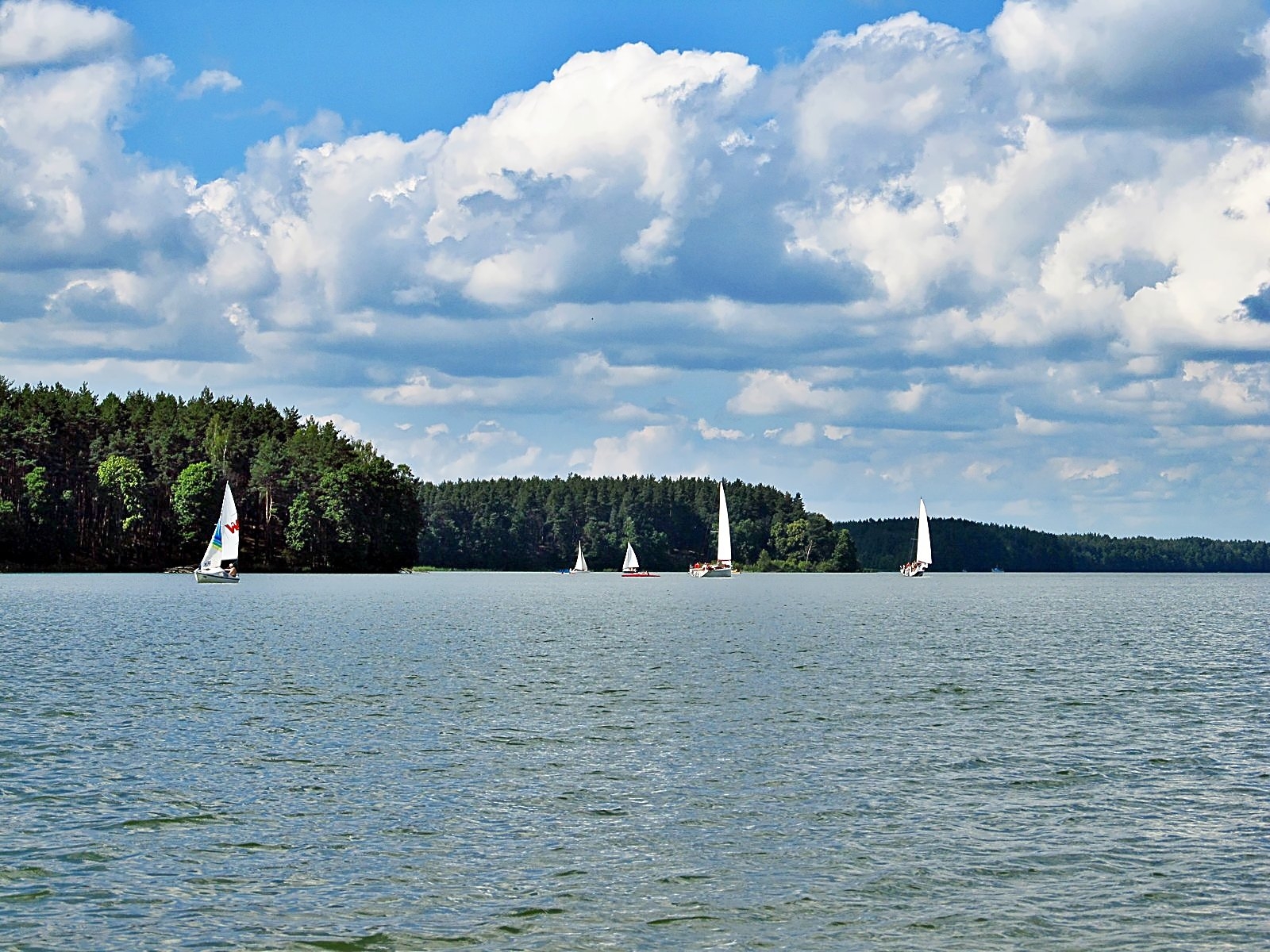
Wdzydze Lake (Pomeranian Voivodeship)

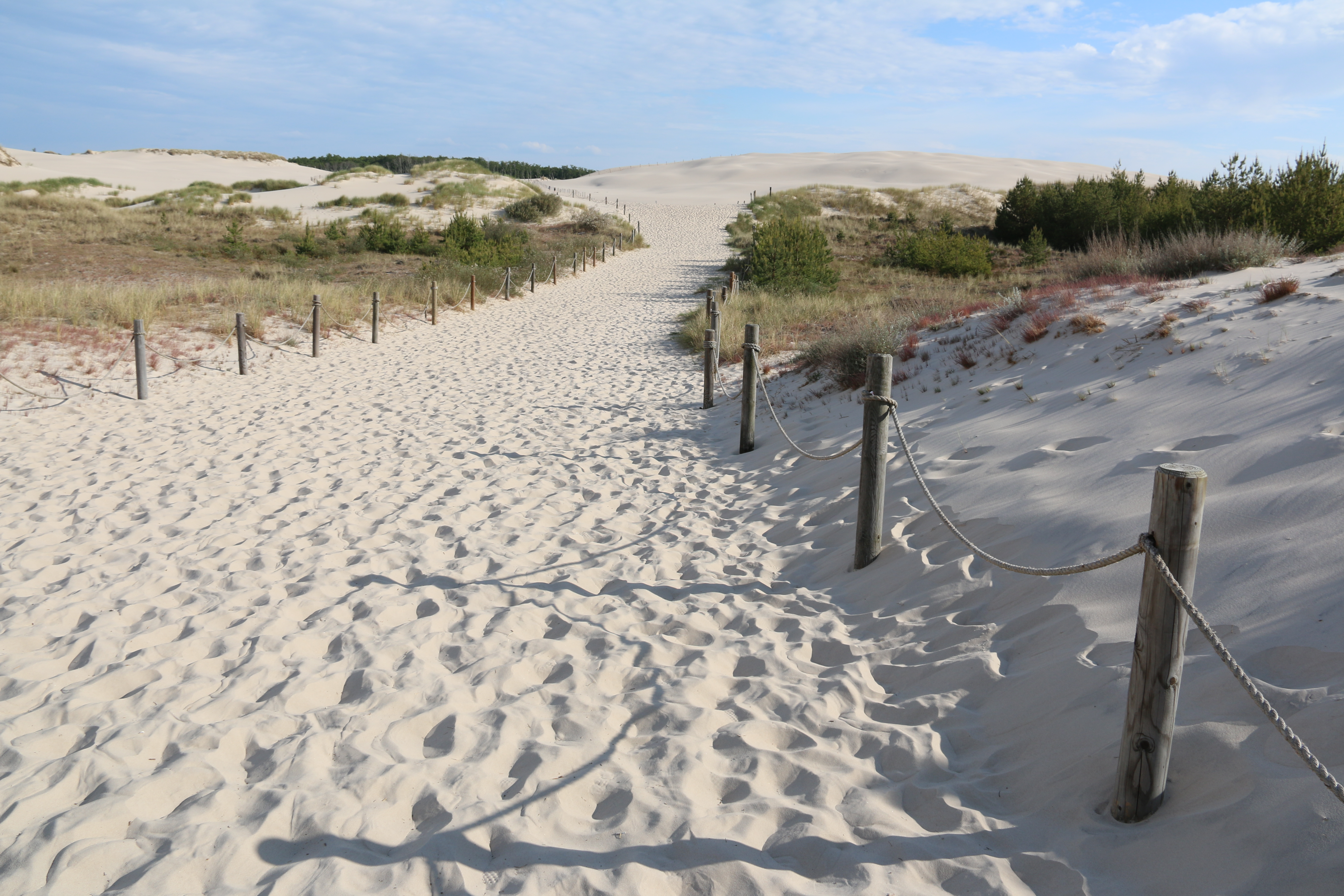
Słowiński National Park (Pomeranian Voivodeship)

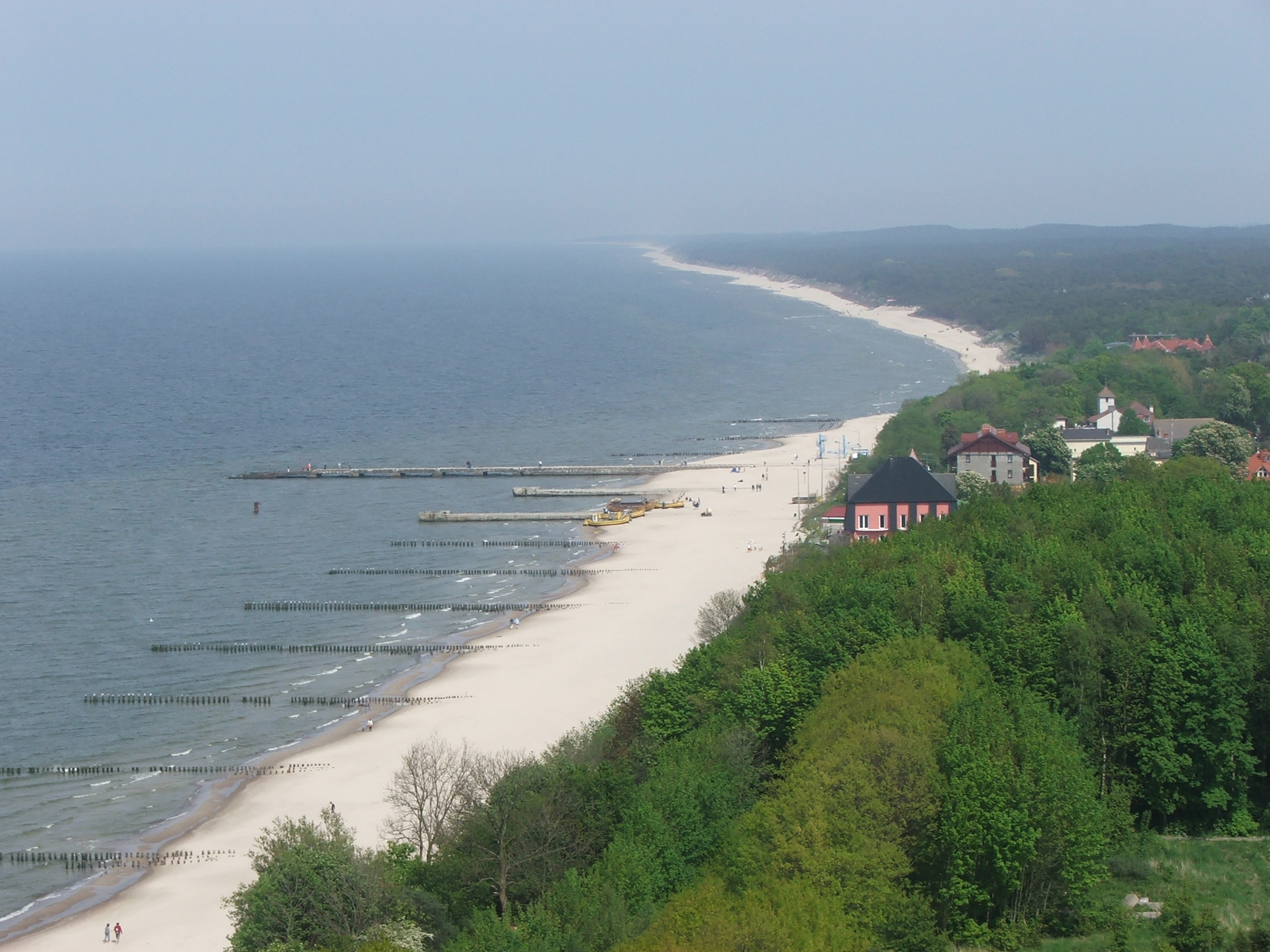
Typical Pomeranian beach (West Pomeranian Voivodeship)

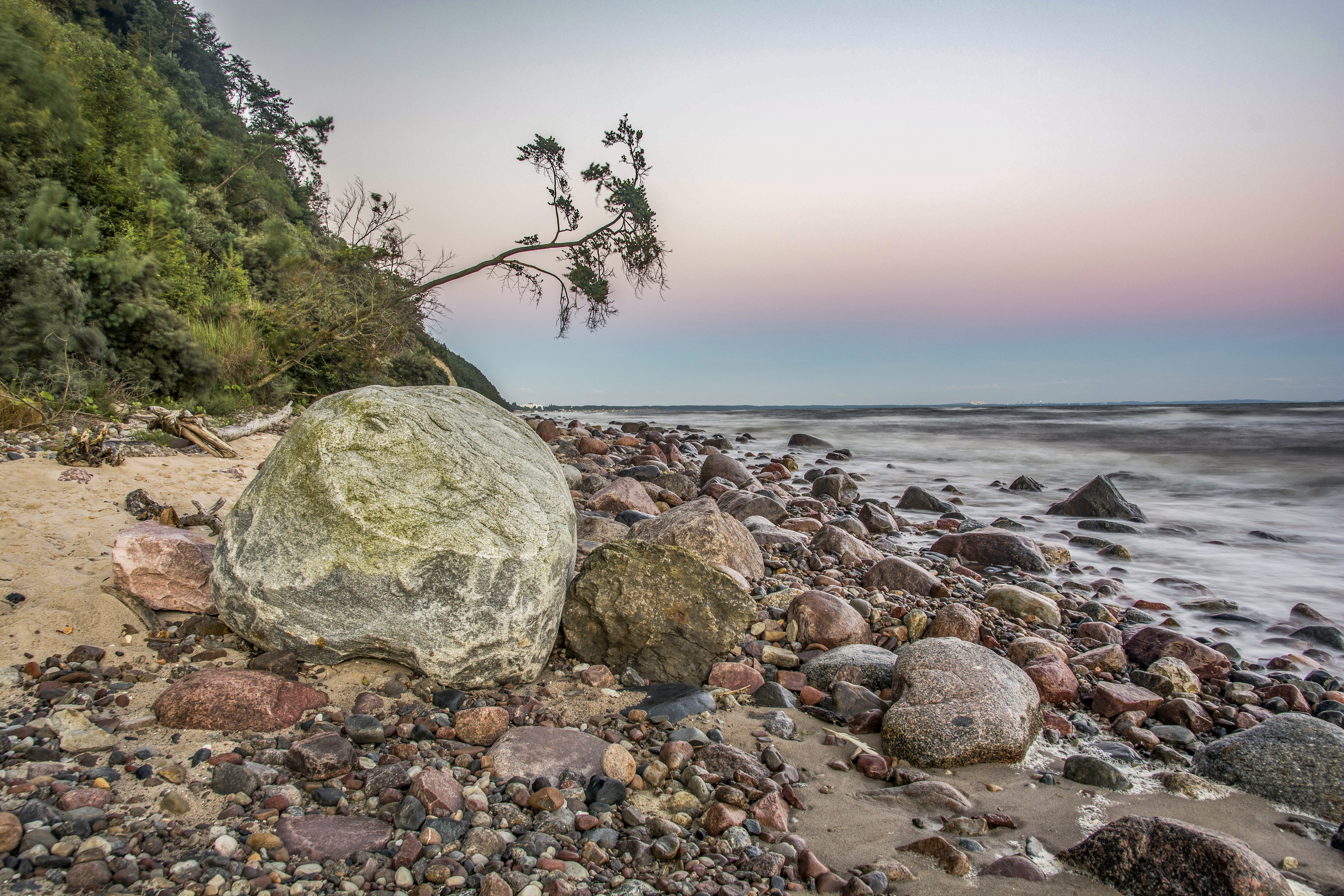
Wolin National Park (West Pomeranian Voivodeship)

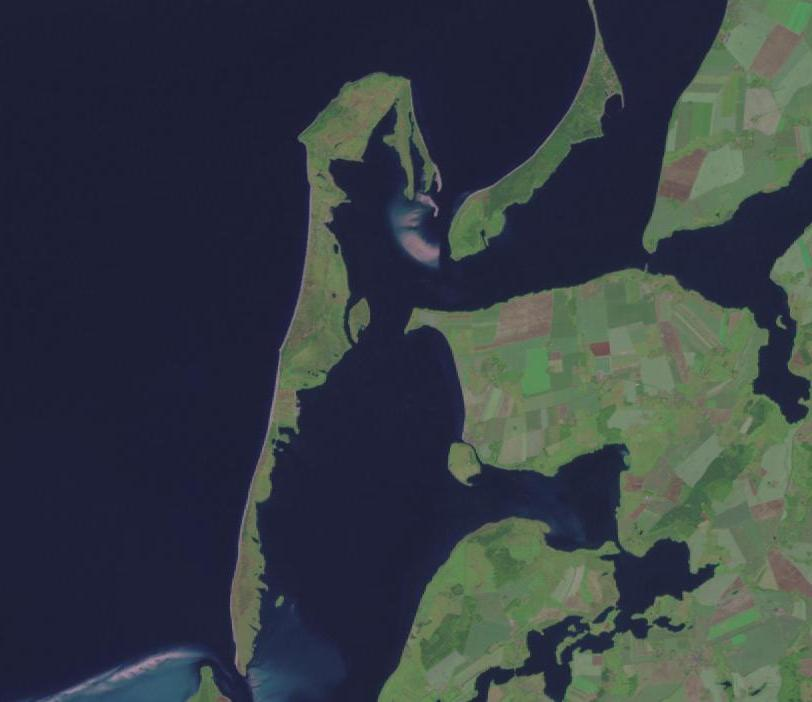
Hiddensee (Mecklenburg-Vorpommern/Western Pomerania)

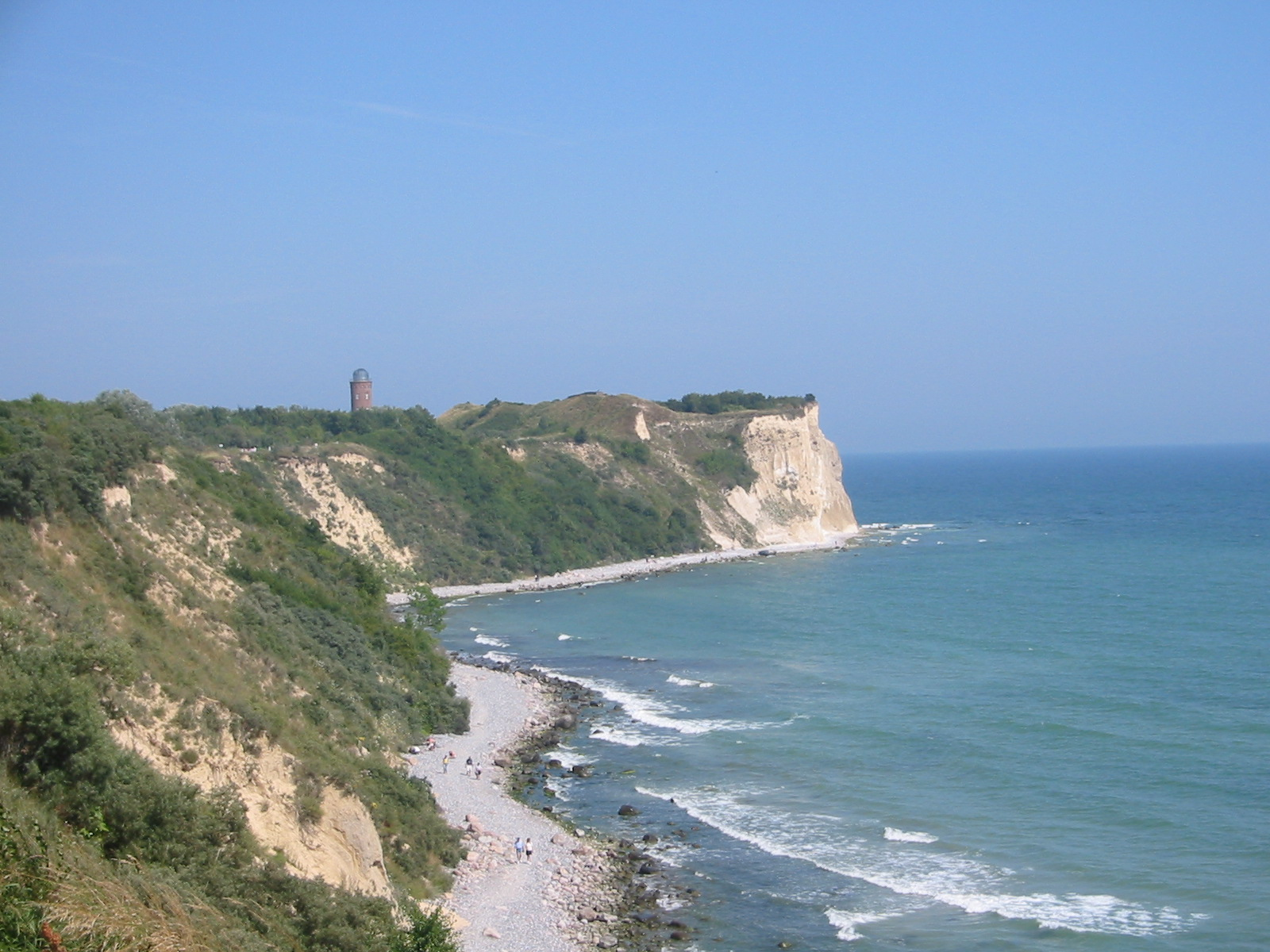
Cape Arkona (Mecklenburg-Vorpommern/Western Pomerania)

== Nomenclature ==
=== Etymology ===
In Lechitic languages the prefix "po-" means along, not to be confused with the preposition "po", which means after. Pomorze, therefore, means Along the Sea. This construction is similar to toponyms Pogórze (Along the Mountains), Polesie (Along the Forest), Porzecze (Along the River), etc.

=== Earliest sources ===
Pomerania was first mentioned in an imperial document of 1046, referring to a Zemuzil dux Bomeranorum (Zemuzil, Duke of the Pomeranians). Pomerania is mentioned repeatedly in the chronicles of Adam of Bremen (c. 1070) and Gallus Anonymous (ca. 1113).

=== Terminology and attribution of subdivisions ===
The territorial designation "Pomerania" lacks a universally accepted definition, since it may refer either to combined Hither and Farther Pomerania only (in German contemporary and historical usage) or to Hither and Farther Pomerania combined with Pomerelia (in Polish contemporary and historical usage).

As a consequence, the term "West Pomerania" is ambiguous, since it may refer to either Hither Pomerania (in German usage and historical usage based on German terminology), or to combined Hither and Farther Pomerania (in Polish usage). In parallel, the term "East Pomerania" may similarly carry different meanings, referring either to Farther Pomerania (in German usage and historical usage based on German terminology), or to Pomerelia (in Polish usage).

As a further complication, the borders of the eponymous administrative units have been drawn disregarding mostly the historical ones. The Polish unit called województwo zachodniopomorskie (West Pomeranian Voivodeship) includes the whole Polish part of Hither Pomerania, but only the western two-thirds of Farther Pomerania, with the remaining easternmost one-third (Słupsk, Ustka, and Miastko) has been part of the województwo pomorskie ([East-]Pomeranian Voivodeship). The former regional unit stretches however far more south than the historical region, to include the northern part of the historical Neumark, located in the previous medieval border area between Pomerania and Greater Poland (Chojna, Trzcińsko-Zdrój, Myślibórz, Nowogródek Pomorski, Lipiany, Barlinek, Pełczyce, Suchań, Choszczno, Recz, and Drawno), as well as a strip the historical Greater Poland (Tuczno, Człopa, Mirosławiec, Wałcz, and Czaplinek), or even a small parts of Pomerelia (Biały Bór) and Lubusz Land (Dębno); in turn the other one comprises only approximately northern two-thirds of Pomerelia but also parts of historical Malbork Land and Upper Prussia known under the ethnographic designation of Powiśle and constituting the westernmost strip of historical Prussia; and finally, the remaining one third of Pomerelia forms part of województwo kujawsko-pomorskie (Kuyavian-Pomeranian Voivodeship), a further regional unit, in this case bearing a name accurately reflecting historical heterogeneity of its territory. Similarity but to lesser extent, borders of the combined German districts Vorpommern-Rügen and Vorpommern-Greifswald deviate significantly in numerous locations from the historical ones with Mecklenburg and Brandenburg. As a consequence, the common understanding of the terms has started to be used more and more frequently in the sense of the current administrative units.

	West	Pomerania																East	Southeast												
	Ahrenshoop, (Note: Westernmost Pomeranian settlement.); Ribnitz-Damgarten (Damgarten only), Saal, Prerow, Zingst, Barth, Tribsees, Franzburg, Richtenberg, Grimmen, Stralsund, DÄNHOLM	Rügen; HIDDENSEE, UMMANZ, Garz/Rügen, Bergen auf Rügen, Putgarten, VILM, Sagard, Binz, Sassnitz, Sellin, Thiessow, Göhren	Loitz, Gützkow, Greifswald, Lubmin, Kröslin, RUDEN, GREIFSWALDER OIE, Wolgast, Lassan	Kummerow, Sommersdorf, Verchen, Demmin, Altentreptow	Alt Tellin, Jarmen, Anklam	Usedom; Peenemünde, Karlshagen, Trassenheide, Zinnowitz, GÖRMITZ, Usedom, Zempin, Koserow, Loddin, Ückeritz, Bansin, Heringsdorf, Ahlbeck	Pasewalk, Torgelow, Ueckermünde, Eggesin, Löcknitz, Penkun, Altwarp, Pomellen (Note: Easternmost settlement in Mecklenburg-Vorpommern.)	Prenzlau, Brüssow, Schwedt/Oder, (Note: Districts north of the Welse river only.); Gartz (Oder), Mescherin (Note: Easternmost Pomeranian settlement in Germany.)	Uznam/Wolin; Świnoujście, Międzyzdroje, Wolin, Międzywodzie, CHRZĄSZCZEWSKA, Dziwnów (left-bank)	Goleniów, Police, Nowe Warpno, Szczecin, Dąbie	Widuchowa, Gryfino, Banie, Pyrzyce	Maszewo, Stargard, Stepnica, Dziwnów, (Note: Right-bank with historic centre.); Kamień Pomorski, Golczewo, Ińsko, Dobrzany, Chociwel, Gryfice, Gościno, Płoty, Nowogard, Łobez, Węgorzyno, Resko, Trzebiatów, Dobra	Świdwin, Połczyn-Zdrój, Drawsko Pomorskie, Kołobrzeg, Koszalin, Karlino, Tychowo, Bobolice, Białogard, Biały Bór, Szczecinek, Mielno, Kalisz Pomorski, (Note: Also considered part of the historical region of Greater Poland in the medieval period.); Złocieniec, Barwice	Sławno, Darłowo, Polanów, Sianów	Ustka, Słupsk, Miastko, Kobylnica	Łeba, Lębork, Bytów	Biały Bór	Czarne, Człuchów	Chojnice	Ostrowite	Borowy Młyn, Borzyszkowy	Czersk, Brusy	Kościerzyna, Kartuzy, Żukowo, Puck, Władysławowo, Jastarnia, Hel, Wejherowo, Reda, Rumia, (so-called Little Kashubian Tricity); Gdynia, Sopot, Gdańsk (Tricity)	Pruszcz Gdański, Nowy Staw	Krynica Morska	Narmeln	Starogard Gdański, Skarszewy, Pelplin, Tczew, Gniew, Skórcz	Świecie, Nowe	Obrowo	Tuchola, Pruszcz	Toruń, Grudziądz, Chełmno, Chełmża, Wąbrzeźno, Kowalewo Pomorskie, Jabłonowo Pomorskie, Radzyń Chełmiński, Łasin, Brodnica, (Note: Part north of Drwęca with historic center.); Golub
Current countries	Germany								Poland																	Russia	Poland				
Current administrative regions	Mecklenburg-Vorpommern (Mecklenburg-Western Pomerania)							Brandenburg	województwo zachodniopomorskie (West Pomeranian Voivodeship)						województwo pomorskie (Pomeranian Voivodeship)		województwo zachodniopom. (West Pomeranian Voivodeship)	województwo pomorskie (Pomeranian Voivodeship)								Калининградская область (Kaliningrad Oblast)	województwo pomorskie (Pomeranian Voivodeship)	województwo kujawsko-pomorskie (Kuyavian-Pomeranian Voivodeship)			
Current administrative regions	Vorpommern-Rügen		Vorpommern-Greifswald	Mecklenburgische Seenplatte	Vorpommern-Greifswald			Uckermark	województwo zachodniopomorskie (West Pomeranian Voivodeship)						województwo pomorskie (Pomeranian Voivodeship)		województwo zachodniopom. (West Pomeranian Voivodeship)	województwo pomorskie (Pomeranian Voivodeship)								Калининградская область (Kaliningrad Oblast)	województwo pomorskie (Pomeranian Voivodeship)	województwo kujawsko-pomorskie (Kuyavian-Pomeranian Voivodeship)			
German terminology (corresponding English term)	Pommern (Pomerania) bounded in the west by the Recknitz, Trebel and Lake Kummerow, and in the east by the Piaśnica																Pomerellen, Pommerellen (Pomerelia); After Partitions of Poland, part of the wider Westpreussen (West Prussia) before Partitions of Poland, part of the wider Königlich-Preußen or Preußen Königlichen Anteils (Royal Prussia)														
German terminology (corresponding English term)	Vorpommern (Hither Pomerania, Fore Pomerania) in modern usage the part located in Germany only										Hinterpommern (Farther/Further Pomerania, Rear Pomerania)								Tucheler Heide (Tuchola Forest)		Kaschubei				Frische Nehrung (Vistula Spit)		Kociewie		Tucheler Heide (Tuchola Forest)		Kulmerland (Chełmno Land)
German terminology (corresponding English term)	Neuvorpommern (New Hither Pomerania) western part of Swedish Pomerania that went from Sweden to Prussia in 1815			Altvorpommern (Old Hither Pomerania) eastern part of Swedish Pomerania that went from Sweden to Prussia in 1720							Hinterpommern (Farther/Further Pomerania, Rear Pomerania)								Tucheler Heide (Tuchola Forest)		Kaschubei				Frische Nehrung (Vistula Spit)		Kociewie		Tucheler Heide (Tuchola Forest)		Kulmerland (Chełmno Land)
German terminology (corresponding English term)	Westpommern (Western Pomerania) mainland west of the Zarow and Rügen archipelago					Mittelpommern (Middle Pomerania) mainland east of the Zarow as well as Usedom and Wolin							Ostpommern (Eastern Pomerania)						Tucheler Heide (Tuchola Forest)		Kaschubei				Frische Nehrung (Vistula Spit)		Kociewie		Tucheler Heide (Tuchola Forest)		Kulmerland (Chełmno Land)
German terminology (corresponding English term)	Westpommern (Western Pomerania) mainland west of the Zarow and Rügen archipelago						Mittelpommerscher Keil (Middle Pomeranian Wedge) excluding Uznam and Wolin							Lande Schlawe und Stolp (Lands of Schlawe and Stolp)		Lande Lauenburg und Bütow (Lauenburg and Bütow Land)				Koschneiderei	Kaschubei				Frische Nehrung (Vistula Spit)		Kociewie		Koschneiderei		Kulmerland (Chełmno Land)
Polish terminology (corresponding English term)	Pomorze Zachodnie (Western Pomerania); Pomorze Nadodrzańskie (Oder Pomerania)															Pomorze Wschodnie (Eastern Pomerania); Pomorze Nadwiślańskie (Vistula Pomerania) before World War II simply Pomorze (Pomerelia, literally Pomerania) before Partitions of Poland, part of the wider Prusy Królewskie (Royal Prussia)															
Polish terminology (corresponding English term)	Pomorze Zaodrzańskie (Trans-Oder Pomerania); Pomorze Wołogoskie (Wołogoszcz or German: Wolgast Pomerania)								Pomorze Szczecińskie (Szczecin Pomerania); Pomorze Zachodnie w węższym znaczeniu (Western Pomerania in narrower sense)				Pomorze Środkowe (Middle Pomerania); Pomorze Koszalińsko-Słupskie (Koszalin and Słupsk Pomerania)			Pomorze Gdańskie (Gdańsk Pomerania)															Ziemia chełmińska (Chełmno Land) ethnocultural region
Polish terminology (corresponding English term)	Pomorze Przednie (Hither Pomerania, Fore Pomerania) in modern usage the part located in Germany only									Pomorze Tylne (Farther/Further Pomerania, Rear Pomerania) usage limited mainly to translations of German texts						Kaszuby (Kashubia)			Bory Tucholskie (Tuchola Forest) ethnocultural region		Kaszuby (Kashubia) ethnocultural region			Żuławy Wiślane (Vistula Fens)	Mierzeja Wiślana (Vistula Spit)		Kociewie ethnocultural region		Bory Tucholskie (Tuchola Forest)		Ziemia chełmińska (Chełmno Land) ethnocultural region
Polish terminology (corresponding English term)	Pomorze Przednie (Hither Pomerania, Fore Pomerania) in modern usage the part located in Germany only													Ziemia słupsko-sławieńska (Słupsk and Sławno Land)		Ziemia lęborsko-bytowska (Lębork and Bytów Land)				Kosznajderia former ethnocultural region	Gochy	Zabory		Żuławy Wiślane (Vistula Fens)	Mierzeja Wiślana (Vistula Spit)		Kociewie ethnocultural region		Kosznajderia former ethnocultural region		Ziemia chełmińska (Chełmno Land) ethnocultural region
Kashubian terminology (corresponding English term)	Zôpadnô Pòmòrskô (Western Pomerania)															Lãbòrskò-bëtowskô Zemia (Lębork and Bytów Land)	Pòrénkòwô Pòmòrskô (Eastern Pomerania)														
Kashubian terminology (corresponding English term)	Zôpadnô Pòmòrskô (Western Pomerania)															Lãbòrskò-bëtowskô Zemia (Lębork and Bytów Land)					Kaszëbë (Kashubia) ethnocultural region			Wiselny Zëławë (Vistula Fens)			Kòcéwskô (Kociewie) ethnocultural region		Tëchòlsczé Bòrë (Tuchola Forest) ethnocultural region		Chełmińskô Zemia (Chełmno Land)
Kashubian terminology (corresponding English term)	Zôpadnô Pòmòrskô (Western Pomerania)															Lãbòrskò-bëtowskô Zemia (Lębork and Bytów Land)				Kòsznajderiô (Kosznajderia) former ethnocultural region	Gòchë (Gochy)	Zabòrë (Zabory)		Wiselny Zëławë (Vistula Fens)			Kòcéwskô (Kociewie) ethnocultural region		Kòsznajderiô (Kosznajderia) former ethnocultural region		Chełmińskô Zemia (Chełmno Land)

== History ==
=== Prehistory to the Middle Ages (circa 400 A.D. – 1400 A.D.) ===
Poland with Pomerania under the rule of Mieszko I, c. 960-992. Dagome iudex first defined Poland's geographical boundaries (including Pomerania) and placed the lands under the protection of the Apostolic See.

Settlement in the area called Pomerania for the last 1,000 years started by the end of the Vistula Glacial Stage, some 13,000 years ago. Archaeological traces have been found of various cultures during the Stone and Bronze Age, Baltic peoples, Germanic peoples and Veneti during the Iron Age and, in the Dark Ages, West Slavic tribes and Vikings. Starting in the 10th century, early Polish rulers subdued the region, successfully integrating the eastern part with Poland, while the western part fell under the suzerainty of Denmark and the Holy Roman Empire in the late 12th century. Gdańsk, established during the reign of Mieszko I of Poland, has since become Poland's main port (apart from periods of Poland losing control over the region).

The main burial sites of Pomeranian dukes of the houses of Griffin and Sobiesław

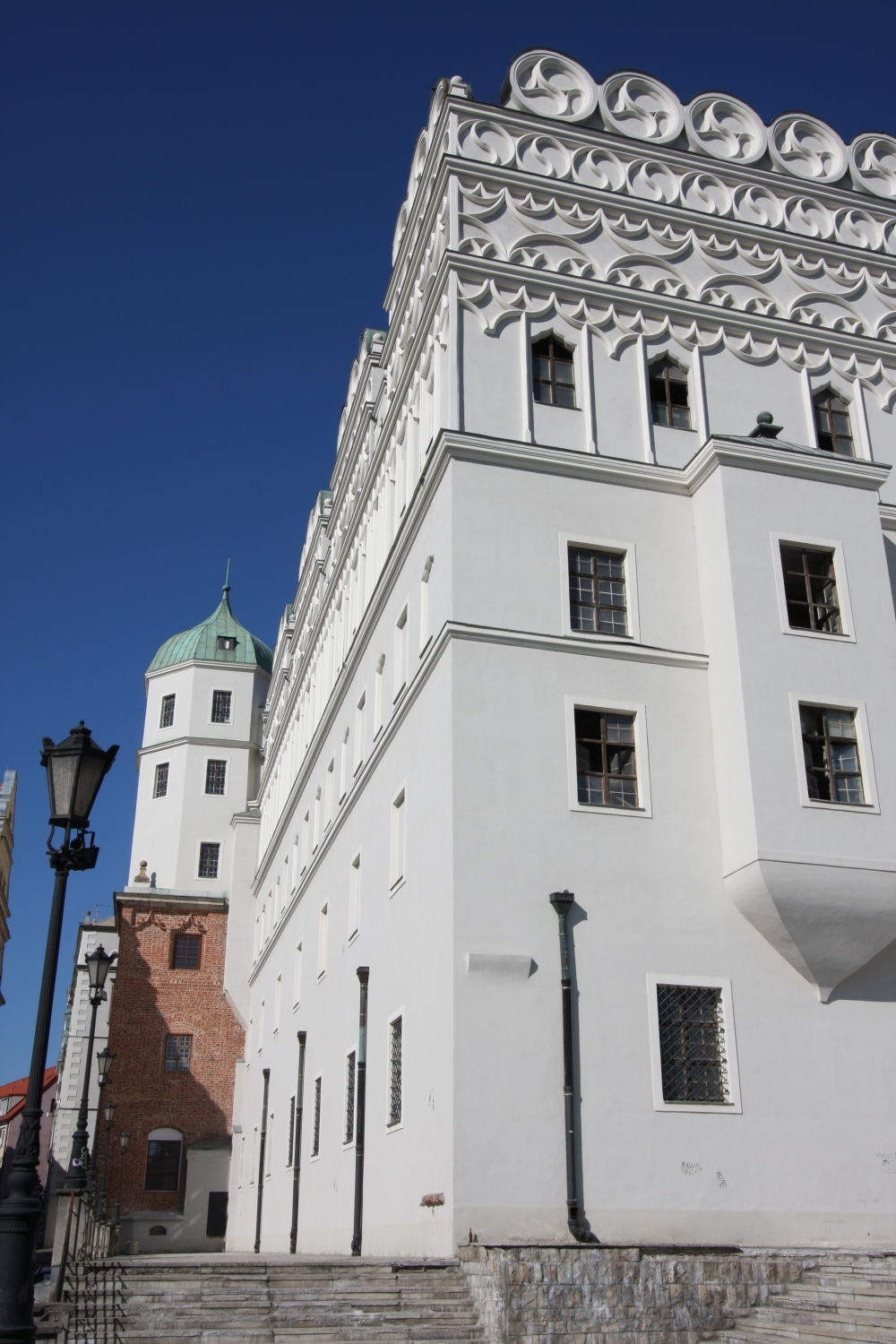
Ducal Castle in Szczecin

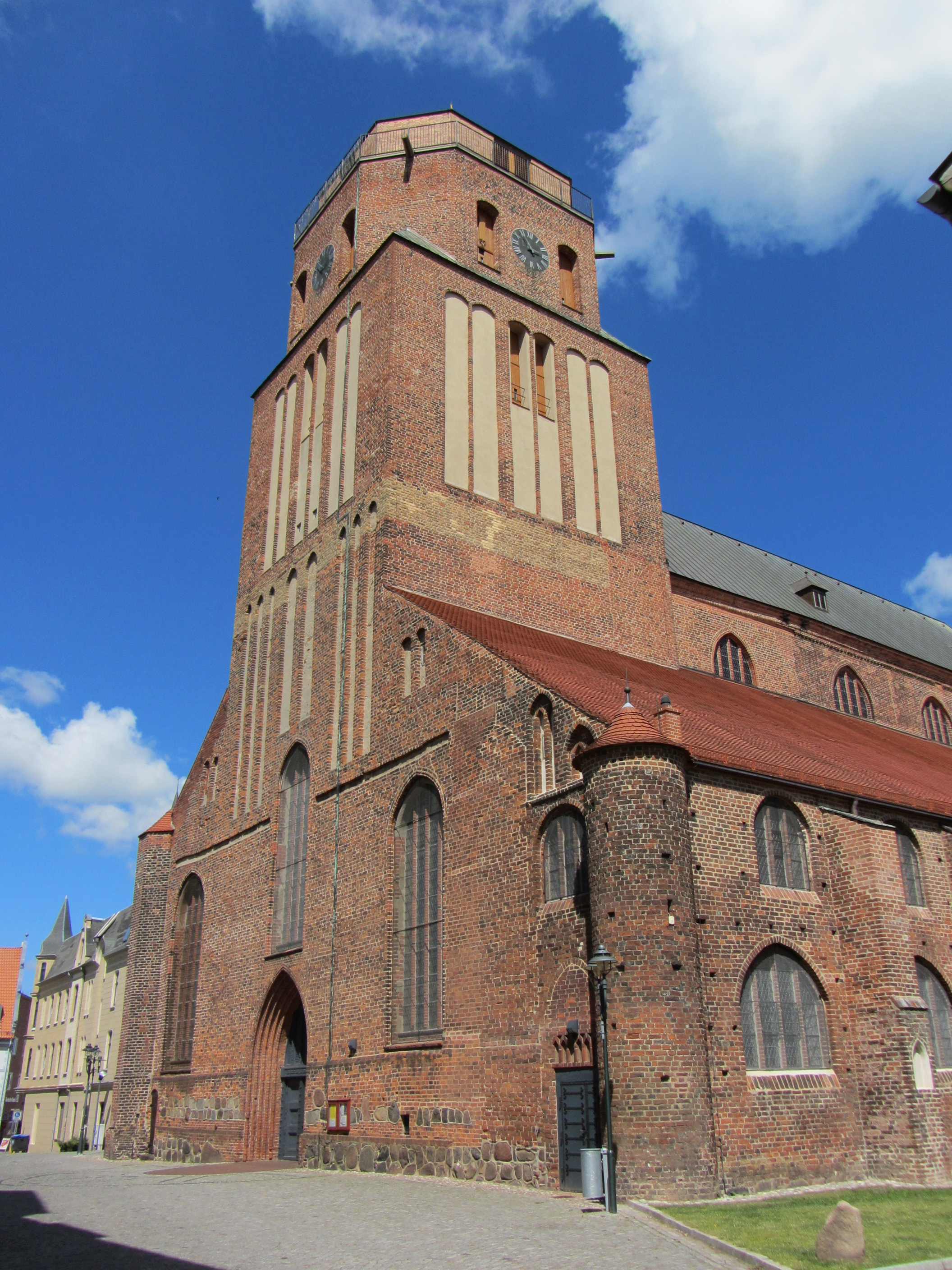
St. Peter's Church in Wolgast

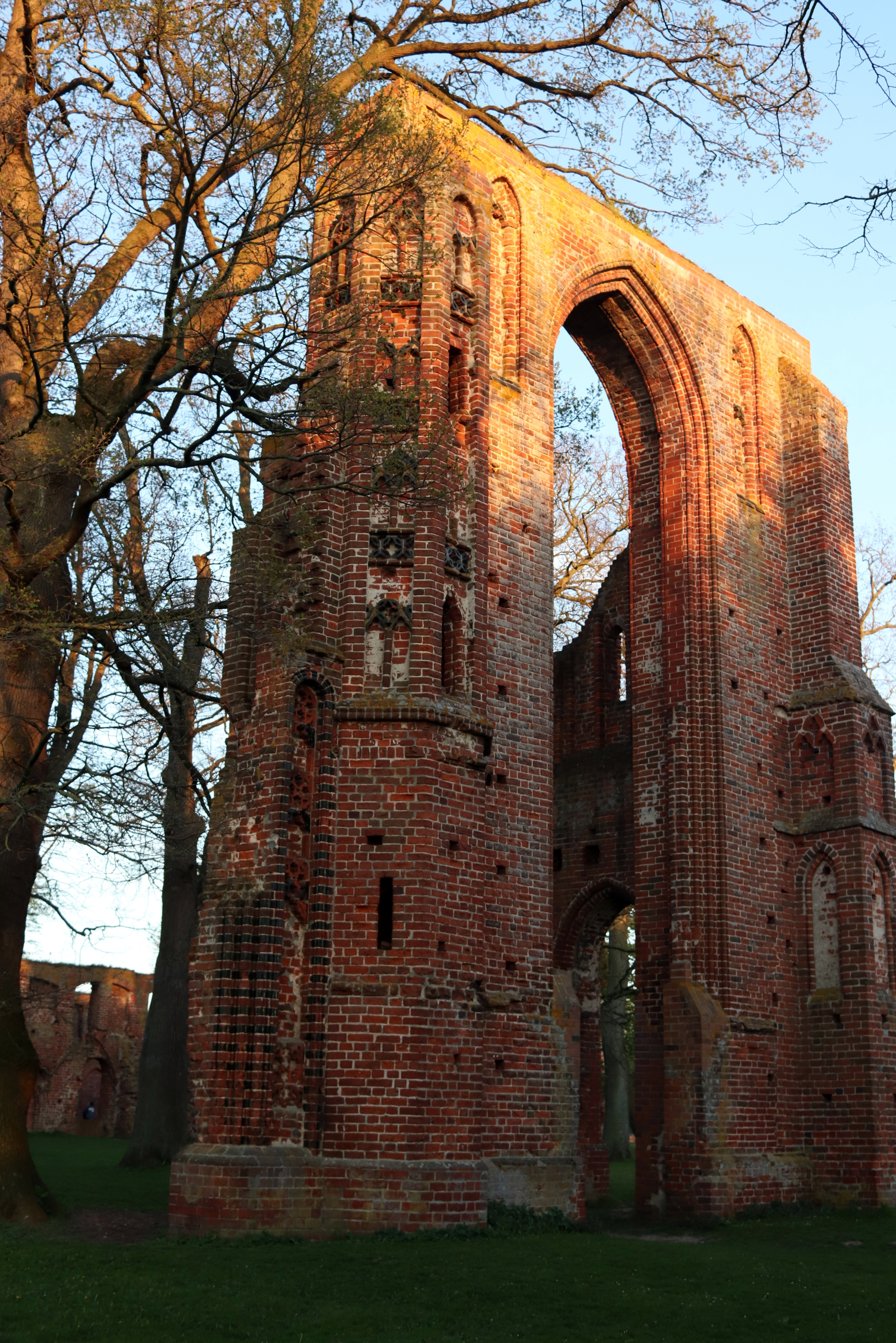
Eldena Abbey in Greifswald

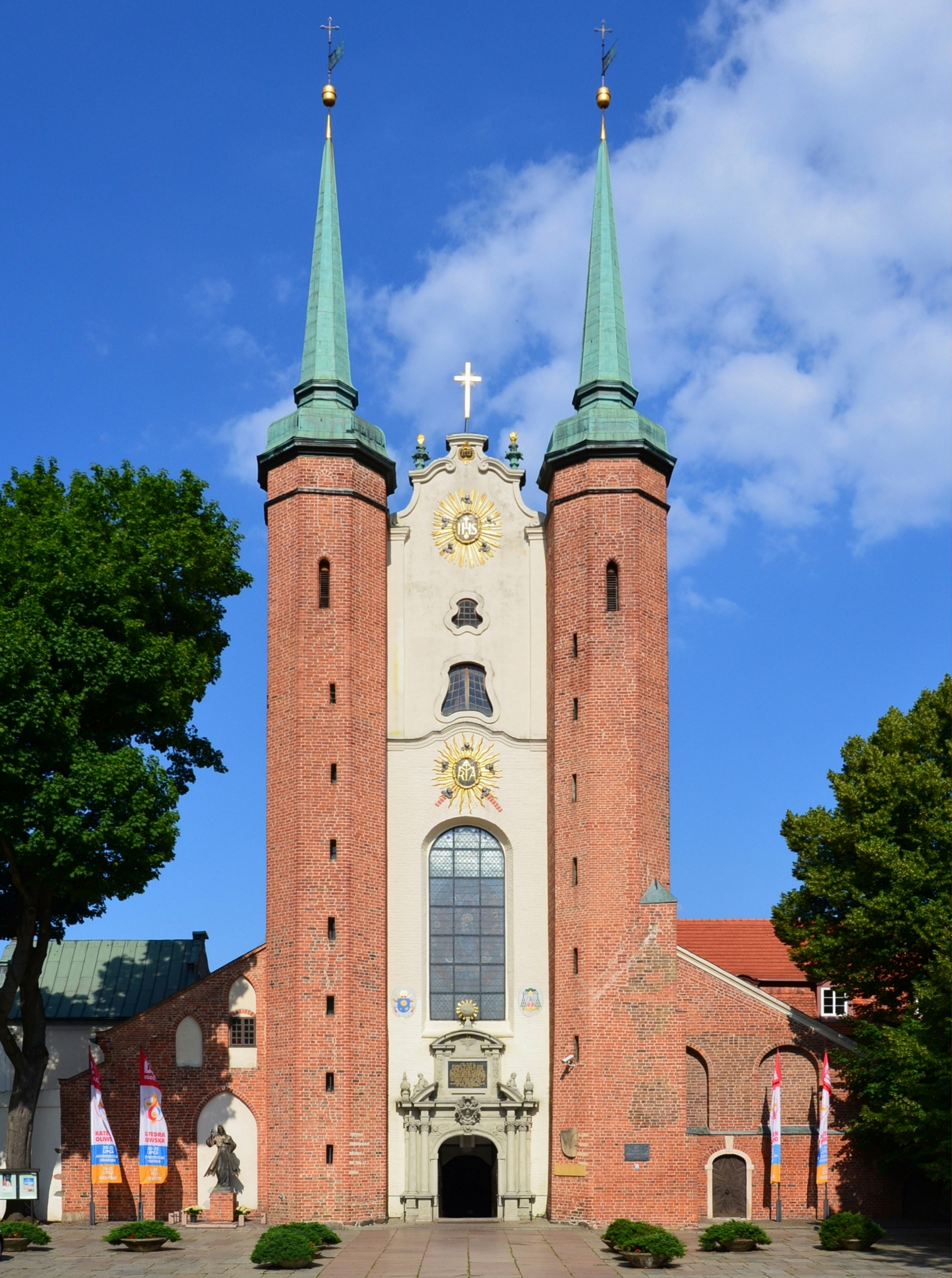
Oliwa Cathedral in Gdańsk

In the 12th century, the Duchy of Pomerania (western part), as a vassal state of Poland, became Christian under saint Otto of Bamberg (the Apostle of the Pomeranians); at the same time Pomerelia (eastern part) became a part of diocese of Włocławek within Poland. Since the late 12th-early 13th century, the Griffin Duchy of Pomerania stayed with the Holy Roman Empire and the Principality of Rugia with Denmark, while Pomerelia, under the ruling of Samborides, was a part of Poland. Pomerania, during its alliance in the Holy Roman Empire, shared borders with West Slavic state Oldenburg, as well as Poland and the expanding Margraviate of Brandenburg. In the early 14th century the Teutonic Knights invaded and annexed Pomerelia from Poland into their monastic state, which already included historical Prussia. As a result of the Teutonic rule, in German terminology the name of Prussia was also extended to conquered Polish lands like Gdańsk Pomerania, although it was not inhabited by Baltic Prussians but Lechitic Poles. Meanwhile, the Ostsiedlung started to turn Slavic narrow Pomerania into an increasingly German-settled area; the remaining Wends and Polish people, often known as Kashubians, continued to settle within Pomerelia. In 1325 the line of the princes of Rügen died out, and the principality was inherited by the Griffins.

=== Renaissance (circa 1400–1700) to Early Modern Age ===
Location of the Pomeranian Voivodeship within the Polish–Lithuanian Commonwealth

In 1466, with the Teutonic Order's defeat in the Thirteen Years' War, Pomerelia became again part of the Polish Crown and formed the Pomeranian Voivodeship within the provinces of Royal Prussia and Greater Poland. While the German population in the Duchy of Pomerania adopted the Protestant reformation in 1534, the Polish (along with Kashubian) population remained with the Roman Catholic Church. The Thirty Years' War severely ravaged and depopulated narrow Pomerania; few years later this same happened to Pomerelia (the Deluge). With the extinction of the Griffin house during the same period, the Duchy of Pomerania was divided between the Swedish Empire and Brandenburg-Prussia in 1648, while Pomerelia remained in with the Kingdom of Poland. In the late 17th and early 18th centuries, French Huguenot communes were established in Danzig, Stargard, Prenzlau, Schwedt, Kolberg, Pasewalk and Stettin.

=== Modern Age ===
The Prussian Province of Pomerania within Prussia and the German Empire circa 1871

Mother Tongues of the Province of Pomerania, according to the 1905 Census

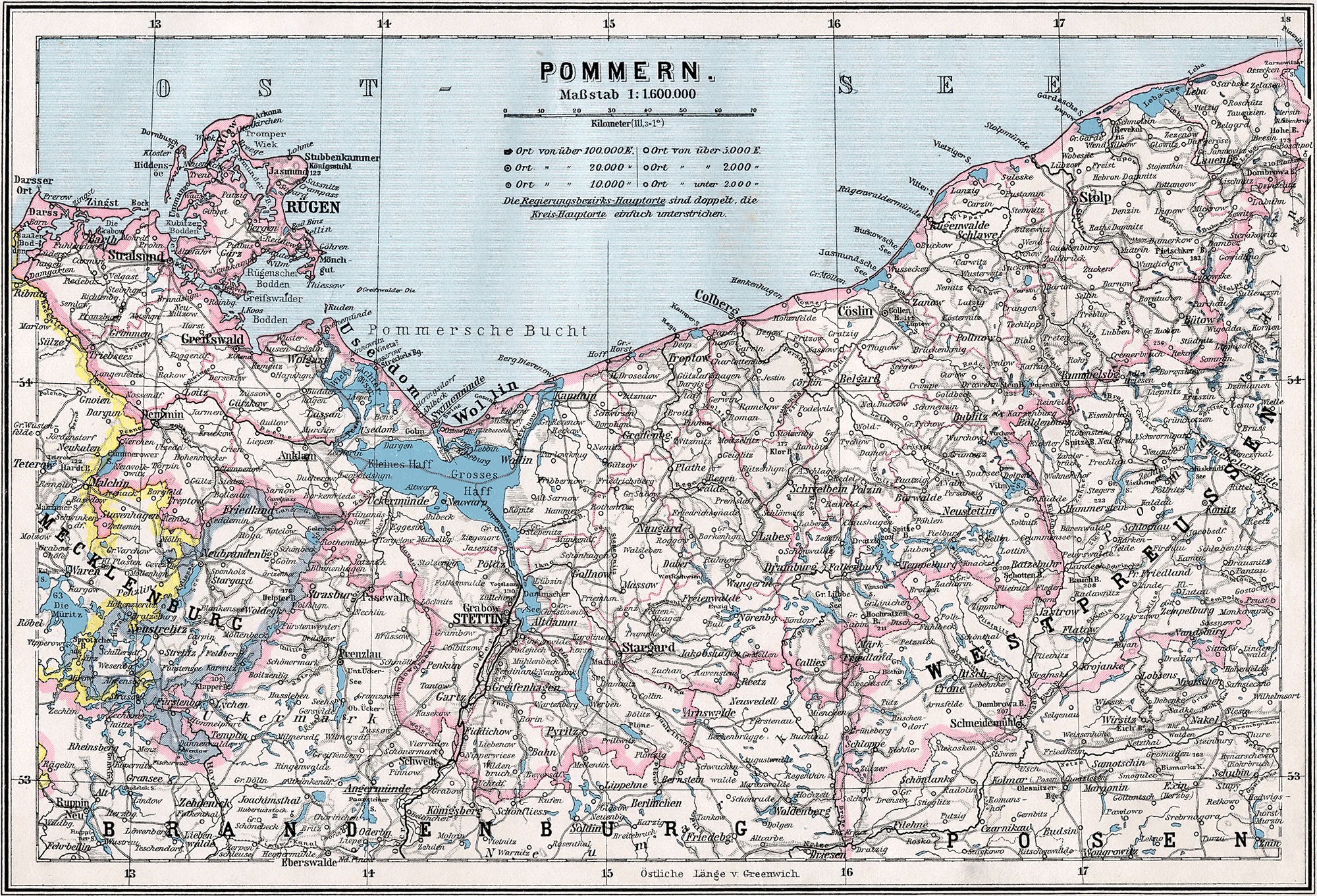
The Province of Pomerania

The flag used in the German part of Pomerania

Prussia gained the southern parts of Swedish Pomerania in 1720, invaded and annexed Pomerelia from Poland in 1772 and 1793, and gained the remainder of Swedish Pomerania in 1815, after the Napoleonic Wars. The former Brandenburg-Prussian Pomerania and the former Swedish parts were reorganized into the Prussian Province of Pomerania, while Pomerelia was made part of the Province of West Prussia. With Prussia, both provinces joined the newly constituted German Empire in 1871. Under German rule, the Polish minority suffered discrimination and oppressive measures aimed at eradicating its culture.

Following the German Empire's defeat in World War I, however, eastern Pomerania/Pomerelia was returned to the rebuilt Polish state, while German-majority Gdańsk/Danzig was transformed into the independent Free City of Danzig. In the interbellum, the border with Poland and the creation of what German propaganda called the "Polish Corridor" were often contested in Germany. Irredentist claims towards Poland were one of the factors contributing to the rise of the Nazi Party in Germany. In 1938 Germany's Province of Pomerania was expanded to include northern parts of the former Province of Posen–West Prussia (part of historic Greater Poland).

Under the Nazi government, the persecution of Poles in the German-controlled part of Pomerania intensified. In January 1939, Germany resumed expulsions of Poles and many were also forced to flee. The Sturmabteilung, Schutzstaffel, Hitler Youth and Bund Deutscher Osten launched attacks on Polish institutions, schools and activists. From May to August 1939, the Gestapo carried out arrests of Polish leaders, activists, entrepreneurs, and even some staff of the Consulate of Poland in Szczecin.

=== World War II ===
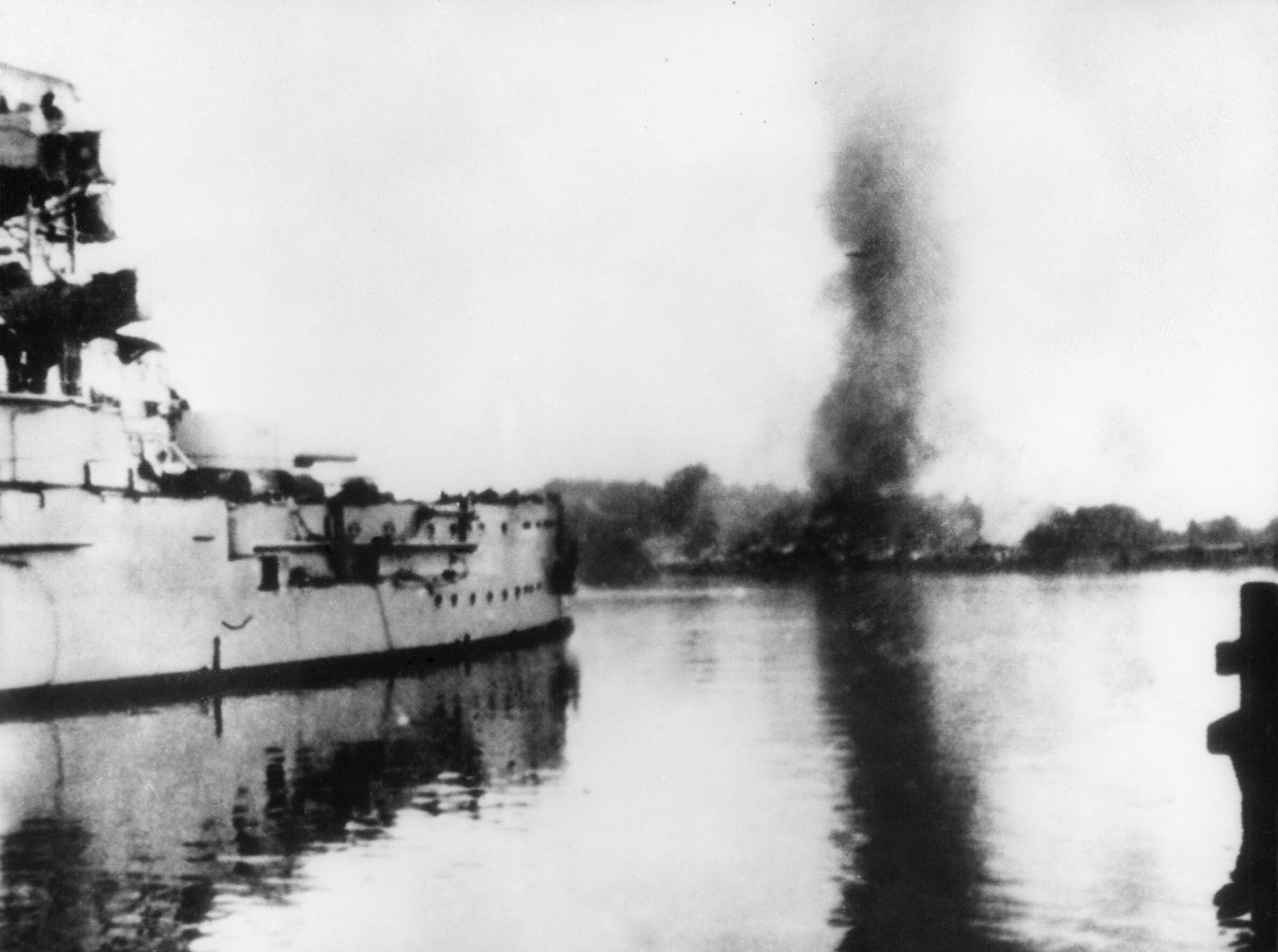
German battleship SMS Schleswig-Holstein firing at the Polish Military Transit Depot during the battle of Westerplatte, 1939

In September 1939, Germany invaded Poland starting World War II. The first battle of the war, at Westerplatte, was fought in the region. Afterwards the Polish part of Pomerania was annexed by Germany, and made part of the Reichsgau Danzig-West Prussia. The Nazis deported the Pomeranian Jews to a reservation near Lublin. The Polish population suffered heavily during the Nazi oppression; more than 40,000 died in executions, death camps, prisons and forced labour, primarily those who were teachers, businessmen, priests, politicians, former army officers, and civil servants. Thousands of Poles and Kashubians suffered expulsion, their homes taken over by the German military and civil servants, as well as some Baltic Germans resettled there between 1940 and 1943 in accordance with the Lebensraum policy. The Stutthof concentration camp with numerous subcamps was located in the region. There were also numerous Nazi prisons, forced labour camps, and multiple prisoner-of-war camps, including the large Stalag II-B and Stalag II-D, for Polish, French, Belgian, Dutch, Serbian, Italian, American, Canadian, Australian, New Zealander and other Allied POWs. Połczyn-Zdrój was the location of a Germanisation camp for kidnapped Polish children. The Polish resistance movement was active both in the pre-war Polish part and the pre-war German part of Pomerania.

After Nazi Germany's defeat in World War II, the German–Polish border was shifted west to the Oder–Neisse line, and all of Pomerania was in the Soviet Occupation Zone. The German inhabitants of the former eastern territories of Germany and Poles of German ethnicity from Pomerelia were expelled. Between 1945 and 1948, millions of ethnic Germans (Volksdeutsche) and German citizens (Reichsdeutsche), were removed from former German territory now governed by Poland and other Eastern European countries. Many German civilians were sent to internment and labor camps where they were used as forced labor as part of German reparations to countries in Eastern Europe. The death toll attributable to the flight and expulsions is disputed, with low-range estimates in the hundreds of thousands (see: Flight and expulsion of Germans (1944–1950)). The area was resettled primarily with Poles of Polish ethnicity, (some themselves expellees from former eastern Poland) and some Poles of Ukrainian ethnicity (resettled under Operation Vistula) and few Polish Jews. Most of Hither or Western Pomerania (Vorpommern) remained in Germany, and most of the expelled Pomeranians found refuge there, later many moved on to other German regions and abroad. Today German Hither Pomerania forms the eastern part of the state of Mecklenburg-Vorpommern, while the Polish part is divided mainly between the West Pomeranian, Pomeranian voivodeships, with their capitals in Szczecin and Gdańsk. During the 1980s, the Solidarity and Die Wende ("the change") movements overthrew the Communist regimes implemented during the post-war era; since then, Pomerania is democratically governed.

Pomeranian dialect and traditions still live in the country of Brazil in a colony where the language is still spoken. The arrival of Pomerania immigrants with Germans and Italians helped form the state of Espírito Santo since the early 1930s. Their importance and respect are one of the cultural signatures of the area. The Brazilian city of Pomerode (in the state of Santa Catarina) was founded by Pomeranian Germans in 1861 and is considered the most typically German of all the German towns of southern Brazil.

== Demographics ==
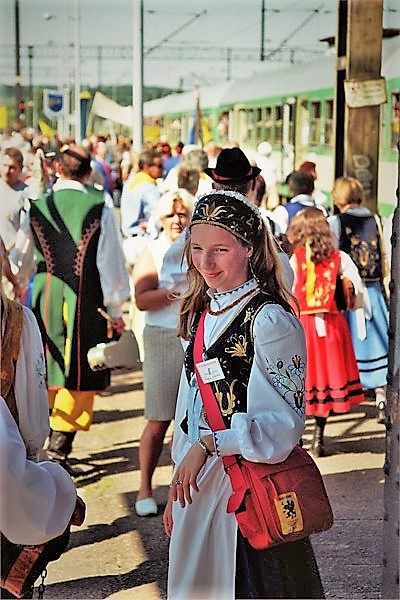
Kashubians in regional dress

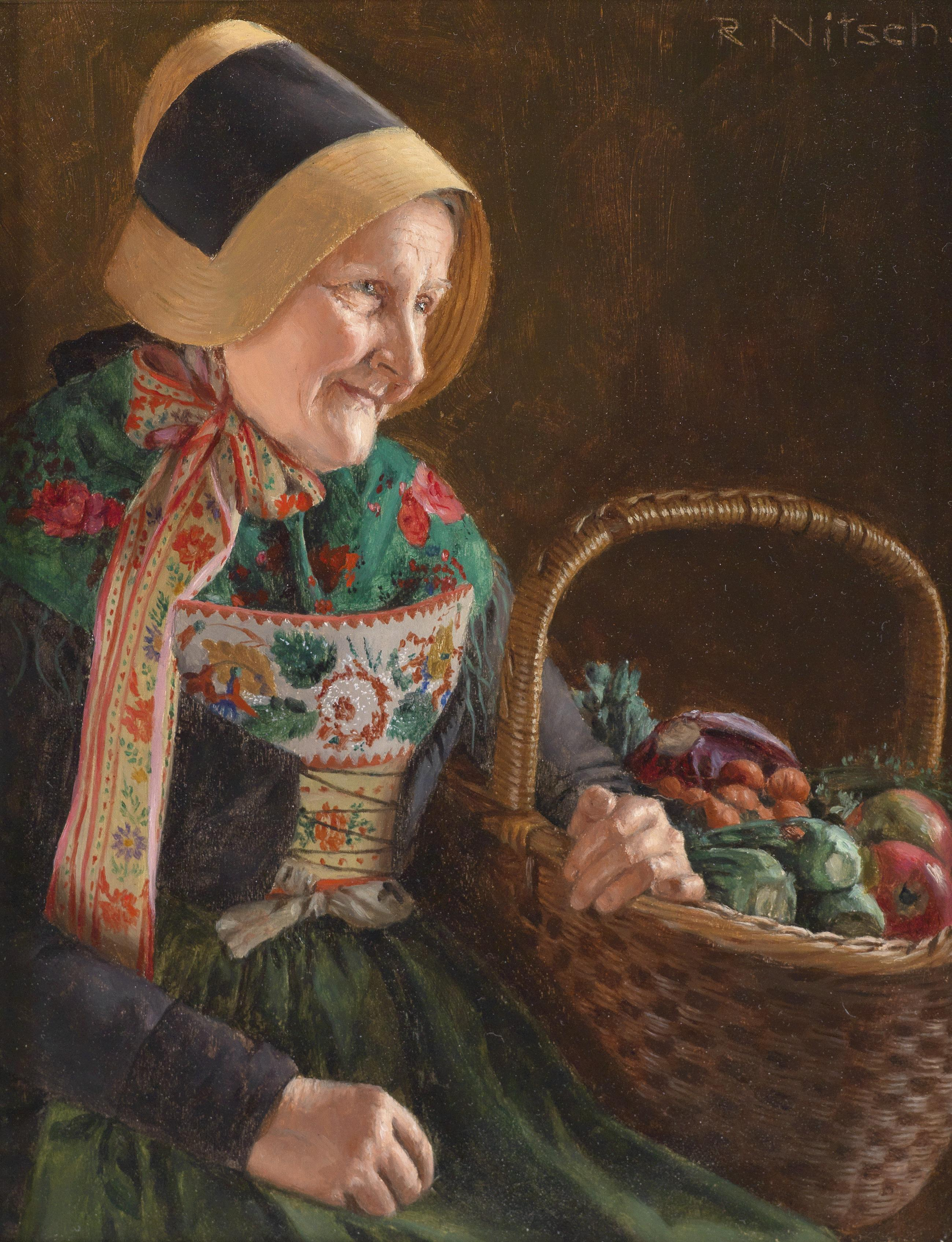
Woman in the regional costume of the Mönchgut area on Rügen

The German part of Western Pomerania is inhabited by German Pomeranians. In other parts, Poles are the dominant ethnic group since the territorial changes of Poland after World War II, and the resulting Polonization. Kashubians, descendants of the medieval West Slavic Pomeranians, are numerous in rural Pomerelia.

German Hither Pomerania had a population of about 470,000 in 2012 (districts of Vorpommern-Rügen and Vorpommern-Greifswald combined) – while the Polish districts of Hither Pomerania had a population of about 580,000 in 2012 (Szczecin and Świnoujście cities with powiat rights, Police County, as well as Goleniów Wolin and Międzyzdroje gminas combined). So overall, about 1.15 million people live in the historical region of Hither Pomerania today, while the Szczecin metropolitan area reaches even further.

Pomerelia is dominated by the Tricity metropolitan area (Pomeranian Voivodeship) with its population in 2012 estimated at least at 1,035,000 and the area at 1,332,51 km^{2}, encompassing the Tricity itself with a population of 748,986 combining the eponymous three cities of Gdańsk (population 460,427), Gdynia (population 248,726) and Sopot (population 38,217), as well as the Little Kashubian Tricity with a population of 120,158 people (2012), formed by the City of Wejherowo (population 50,310 in 2012) and the towns (urban gminas) of Rumia (population 49,230 in 2020) and Reda (population 26,011 in 2019). The area also includes two smaller towns of Żukowo and Pruszcz Gdański belonging to the eponymous urban-rural gminas, and a number of rural gminas.

Region	Seat	Registration plates	Area (km^{2})	Population (Poland 2019/2021, Germany 2022)
West Pomeranian Voivodeship	Szczecin	Z	22,892	1,682,003
Pomeranian Voivodeship	Gdańsk	G	18,293	2,337,769
Kuyavian-Pomeranian Voivodeship; Pomeranian part only	Toruń Voivod council Bydgoszcz Voivod office; not in Pomerania	C	11,980	1,124,517
Polish Pomerania			53,165	5,144,289
Landkreis Vorpommern-Greifswald	Greifswald	VG, ANK, GW, HGW, PW, SBG, UEM, WLG	3,927	237,355
Landkreis Vorpommern-Rügen	Stralsund	VR, GMN, HST, NVP, RDG, RÜG	3,188	227,683
Amt Demmin-Land and City of Demmin in Landkreis Mecklenburgische Seenplatte	Demmin	MSE, AT, DM, MC, MST, MÜR, NZ, RM, WRN	443	17,301
Amt Treptower Tollensewinkel in Landkreis Mecklenburgische Seenplatte	Altentreptow	MSE, AT, DM, MC, MST, MÜR, NZ, RM, WRN	414	13,581
Amt Gartz (Oder) in Landkreis Uckermark, Brandenburg	Gartz (Oder)	UM, ANG, PZ, SDT, TP	264	6,682
City of Schwedt/Oder in Landkreis Uckermark, Brandenburg; Pomeranian parts only: Hohenfelde, Jamikow, Kummerow, Kunow, Schönow	Schwedt/Oder	UM, ANG, PZ, SDT, TP	71	1,028
Municipality of Zettemin in Landkreis Mecklenburgische Seenplatte; historically a Pomeranian enclave of seven villages (the Säben Dörper), southeast of Malchin, surrounded by Mecklenburg	Zettemin	MSE, AT, DM, MC, MST, MÜR, NZ, RM, WRN	19	267
German Pomerania			8,326	503,897
Pomerania			61,491	5,648,186

=== Cities in Pomerania ===
Altogether, there are 16 cities in the broad-sense Pomerania, understood as comprising also Pomerelia. Their list is presented below and includes the 14 municipalities in Poland electing a city mayor (Polish: prezydent miasta) instead of a town mayor (Polish: burmistrz), with 9 of them holding the status of a city with powiat rights (Polish: miasto na prawach powiatu, an independent city), as well as the 2 municipalities in Germany holding the status of a district-belonging city (German: Große kreisangehörige Stadt), as no city of the German part of Pomerania holds currently any higher status, such as a partially of fully independent city (German: Große selbständige Stadt, Kreisfreie Stadt, or Stadtkreis), or a city-state (German: Stadtstaat).

==== Cities in the historical region of Hither Pomerania ====
- Szczecin (city with powiat rights, West Pomeranian Voivodeship): 394,482; up to 763,321 in the metropolitan area
- Greifswald, in Low German Griepswohld (Vorpommern-Greifswald, Mecklenburg-Vorpommern): 59,332
- Stralsund (Vorpommern-Rügen, Mecklenburg-Vorpommern): 59,171
- Świnoujście (city with powiat rights, West Pomeranian Voivodeship); 39,834
- Schwedt/Oder (Uckermark, Brandenburg) expanded in contemporary times, so that it now also encompasses some neighbourhoods north of the Welse, the historical border river between Brandenburg and Pomerania (Blumenhagen, Gatow, Hohenfelde, Jamikow, Kummerow, Kunow, Schönow and Vierraden): 33,524
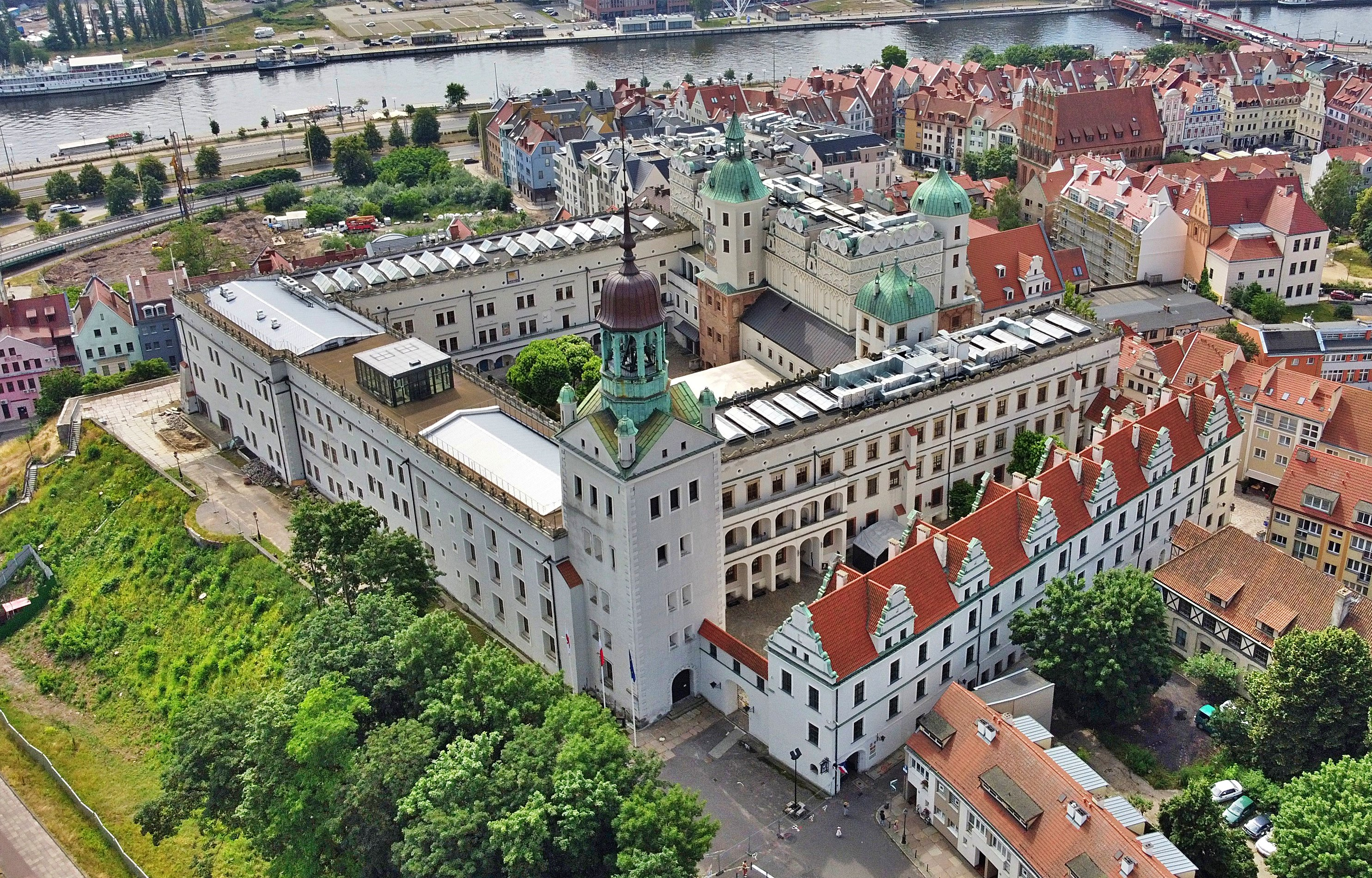
Szczecin

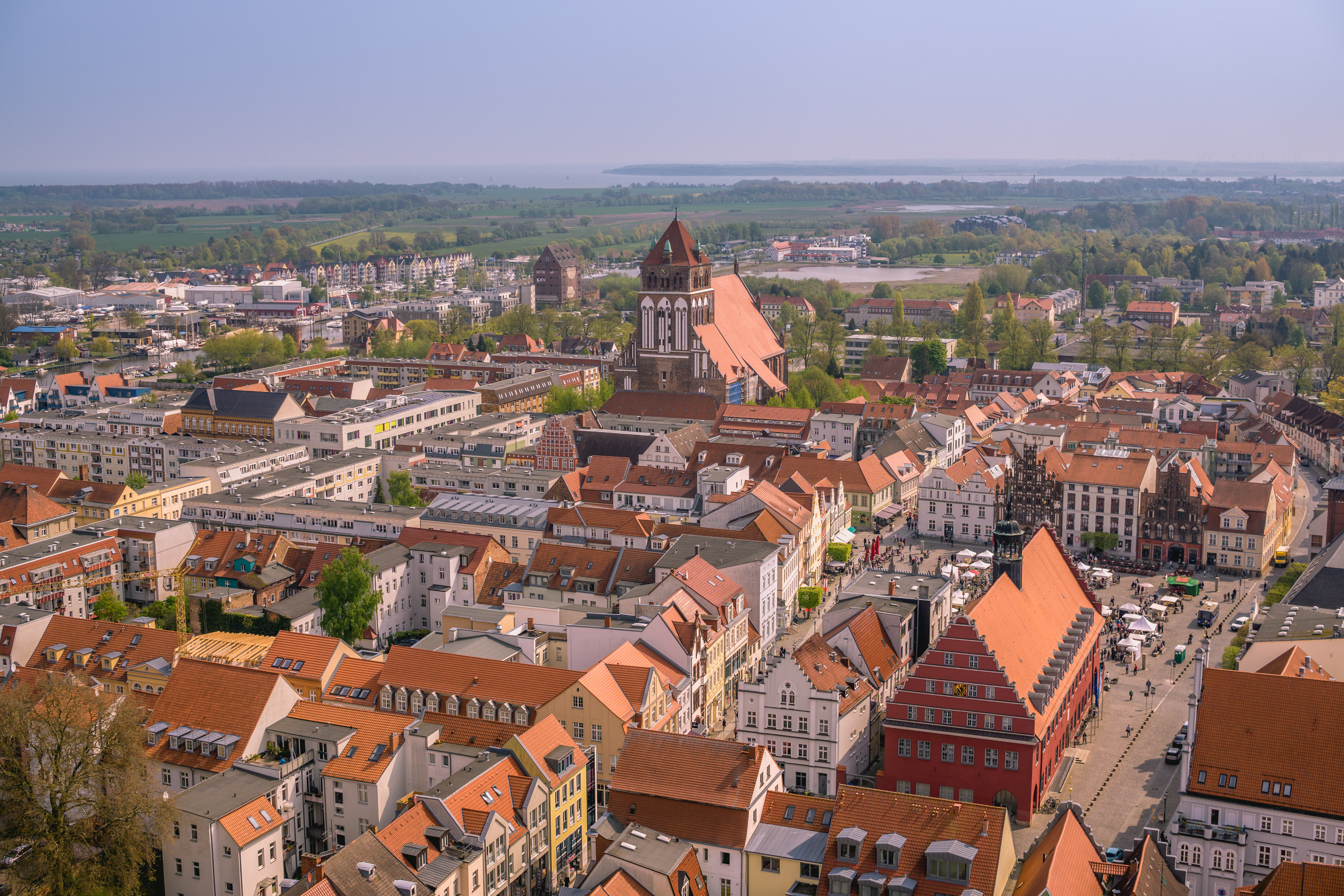
Greifswald

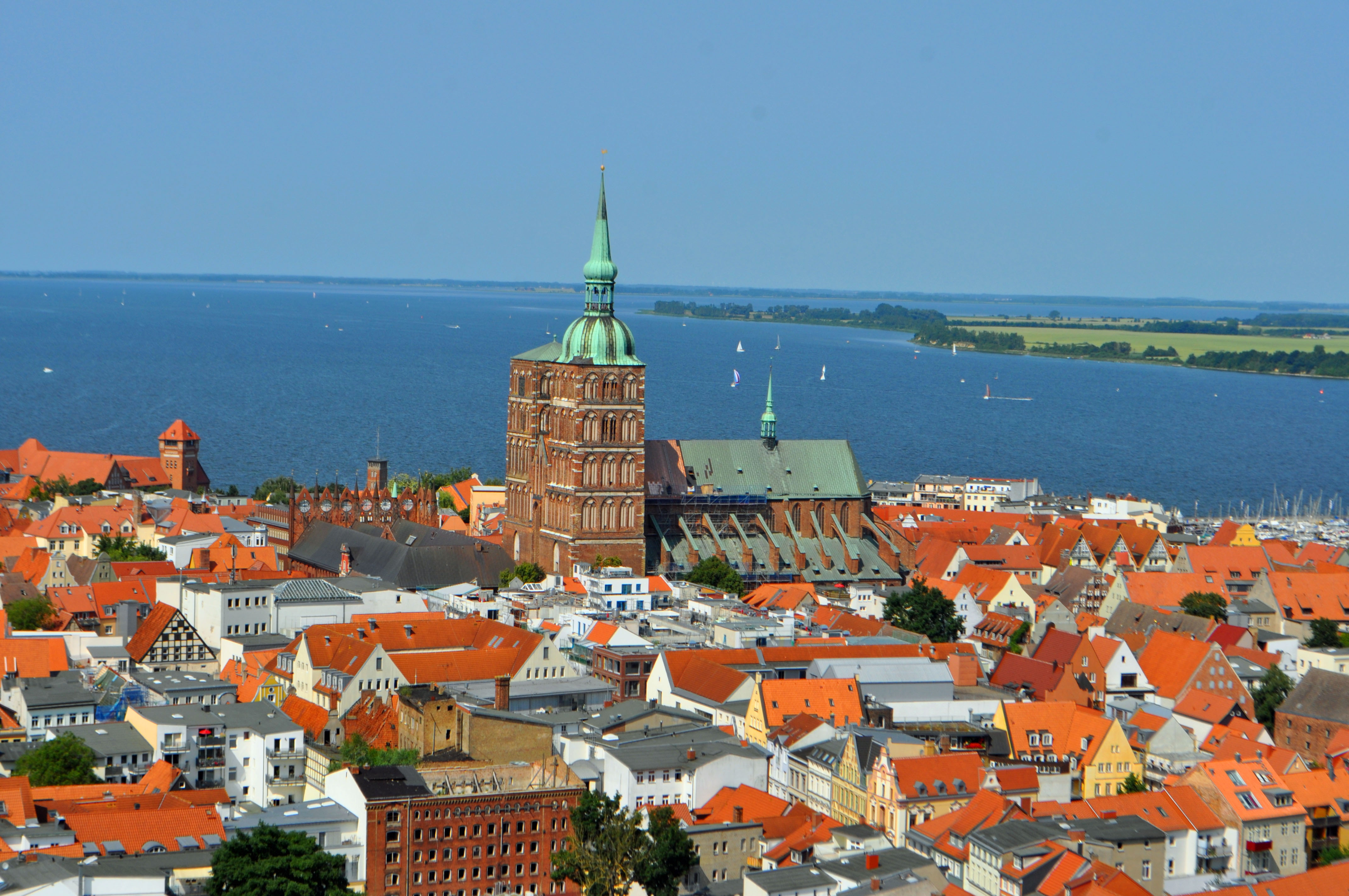
Stralsund

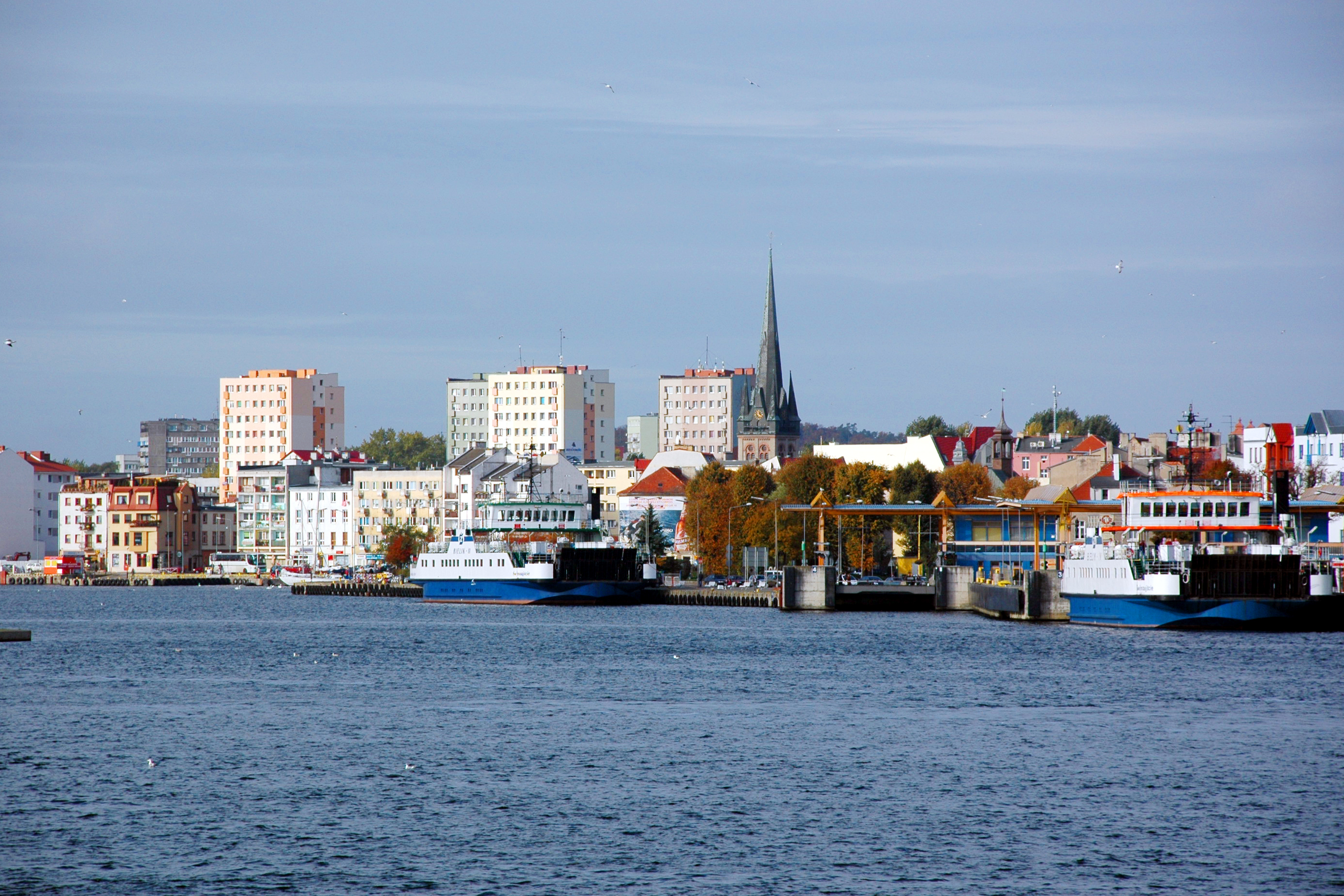
Świnoujście

==== Cities in the historical region of Farther Pomerania ====
- Koszalin (city with powiat rights, West Pomeranian Voivodeship): 109,343
- Słupsk (city with powiat rights, Pomeranian Voivodeship): 94,849
- Stargard (Stargard County, West Pomeranian Voivodeship): 69,724
- Kołobrzeg (Kołobrzeg County, West Pomeranian Voivodeship); 46,259
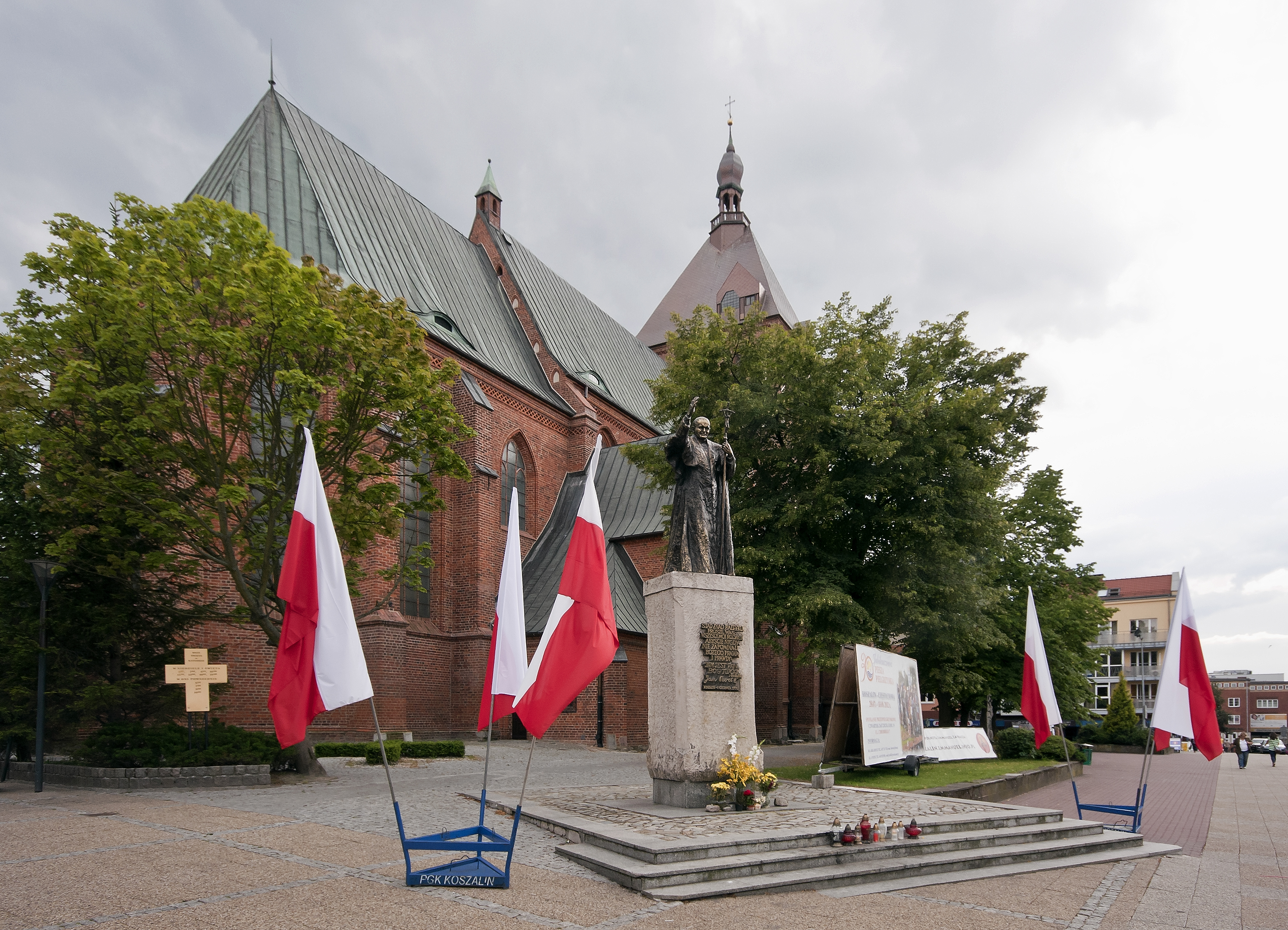
Koszalin

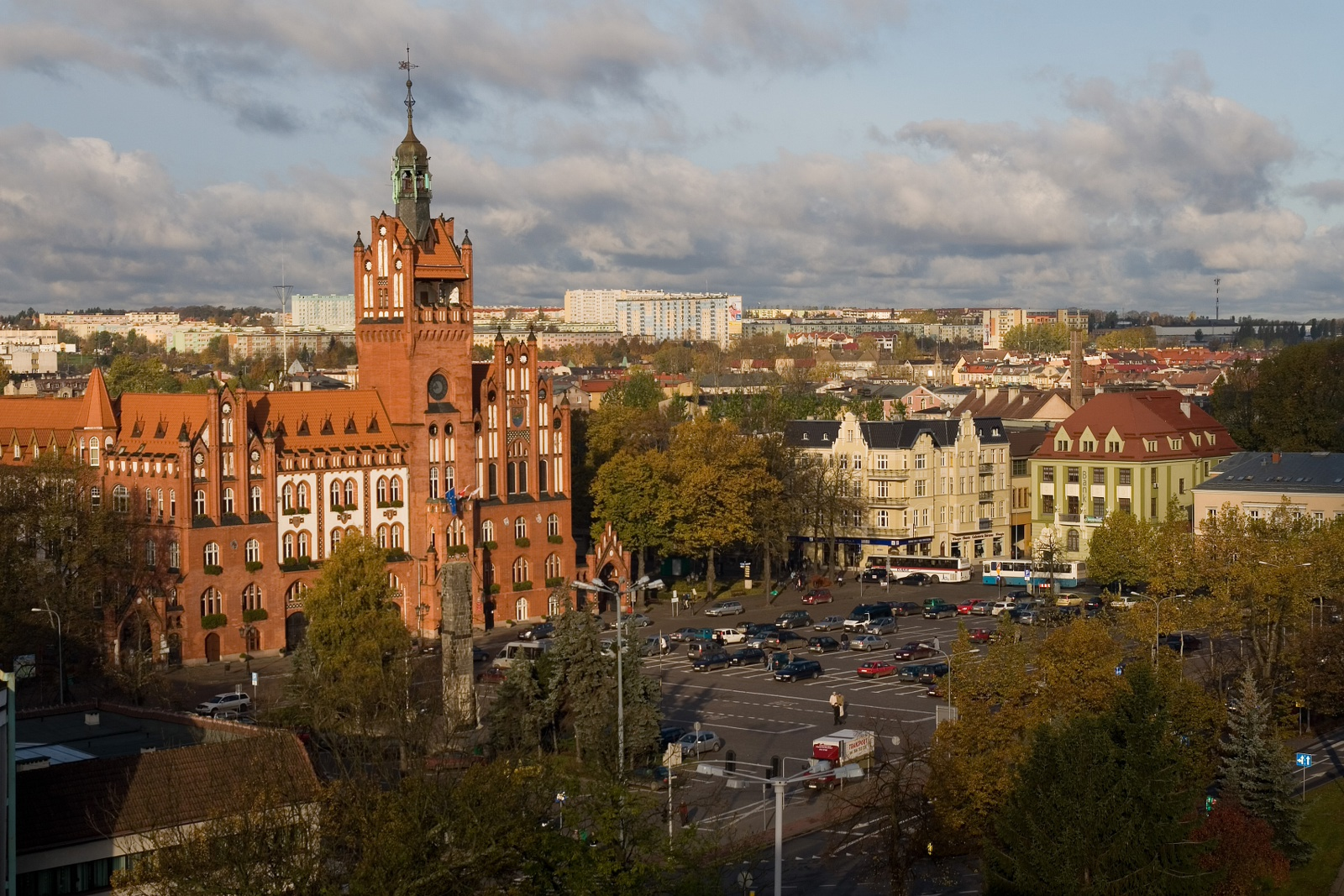
Słupsk

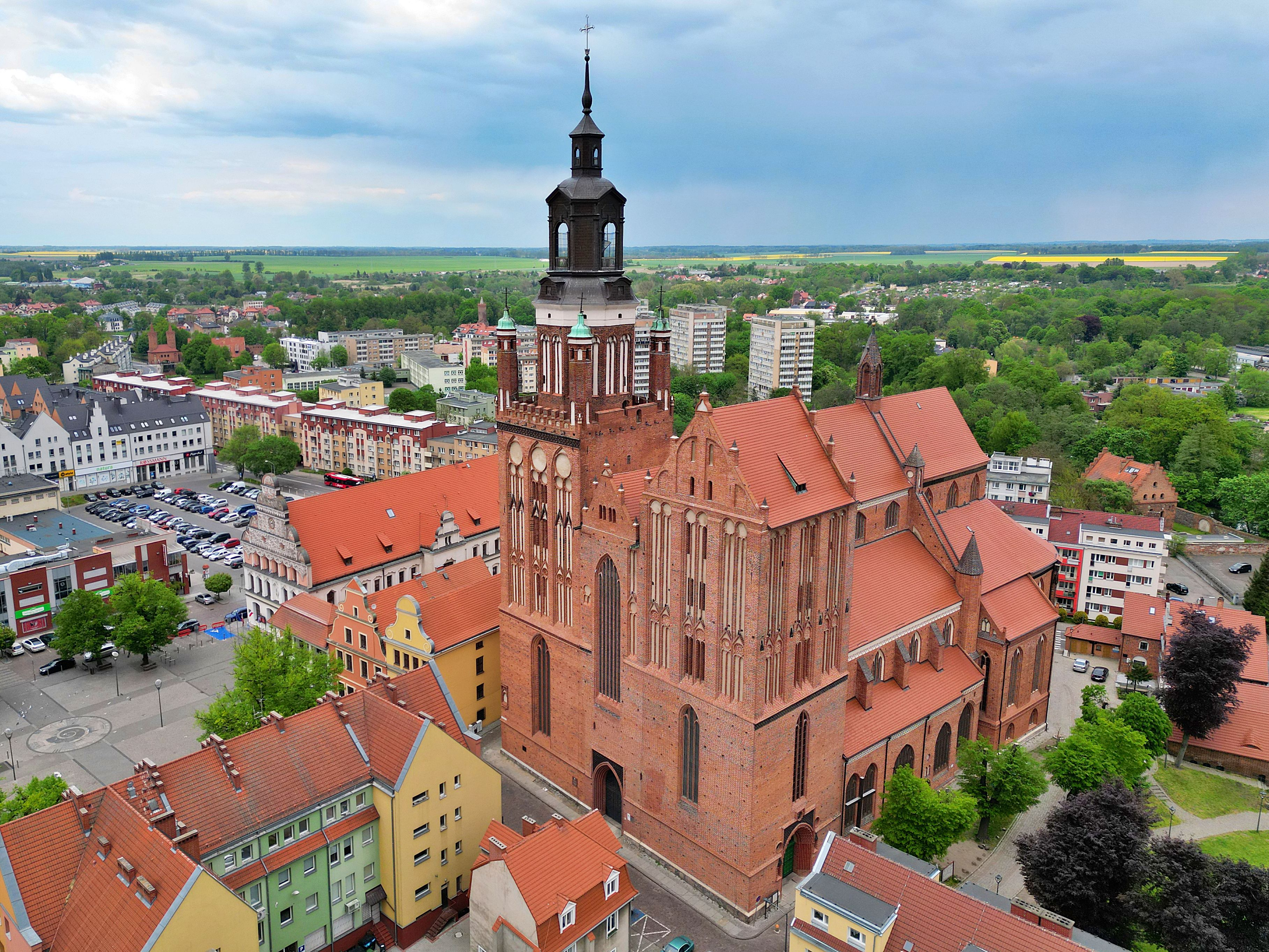
Stargard

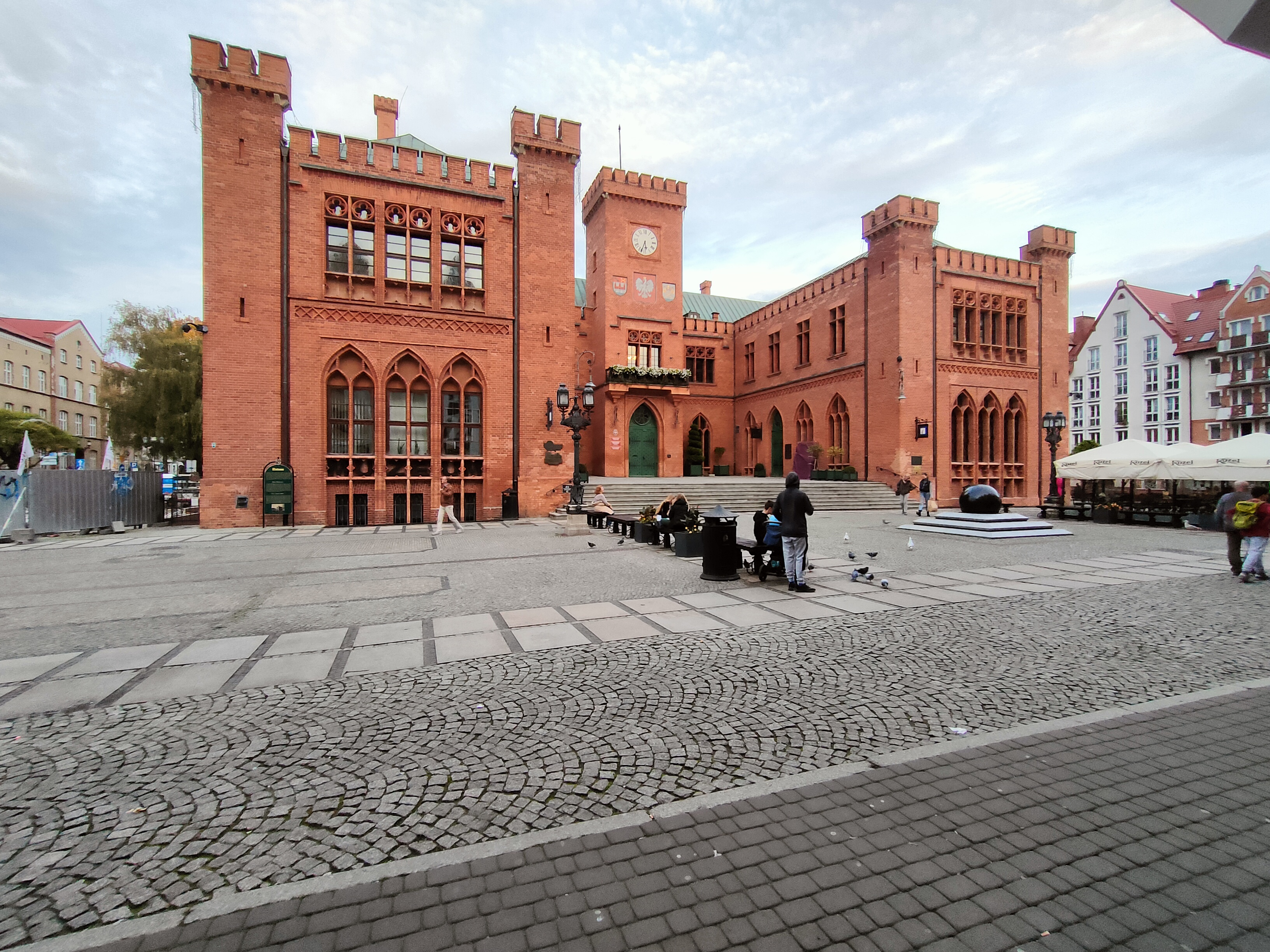
Kołobrzeg

==== Cities in the historical region of Pomerelia ====
- Tricity (Pomeranian Voivodeship): 748,986; the Tricity metropolitan area (Pomeranian Voivodeship): population in 2012; at least 1,035,000 area 1,332,51 km^{2}
  - Gdańsk (city with powiat rights, Pomeranian Voivodeship): 460,427
  - Gdynia (city with powiat rights, Pomeranian Voivodeship): 248,726
  - Sopot (city with powiat rights, Pomeranian Voivodeship): 38,217
- Toruń (city with powiat rights, Kuyavian-Pomeranian Voivodeship): 205,934
- Grudziądz (city with powiat rights, Kuyavian-Pomeranian Voivodeship): 96,042
- Tczew (Tczew County, Pomeranian Voivodeship): 60,279
- Wejherowo (Wejherowo County, Pomeranian Voivodeship): 50,375
- Starogard Gdański (Starogard County, Pomeranian Voivodeship): 44,470
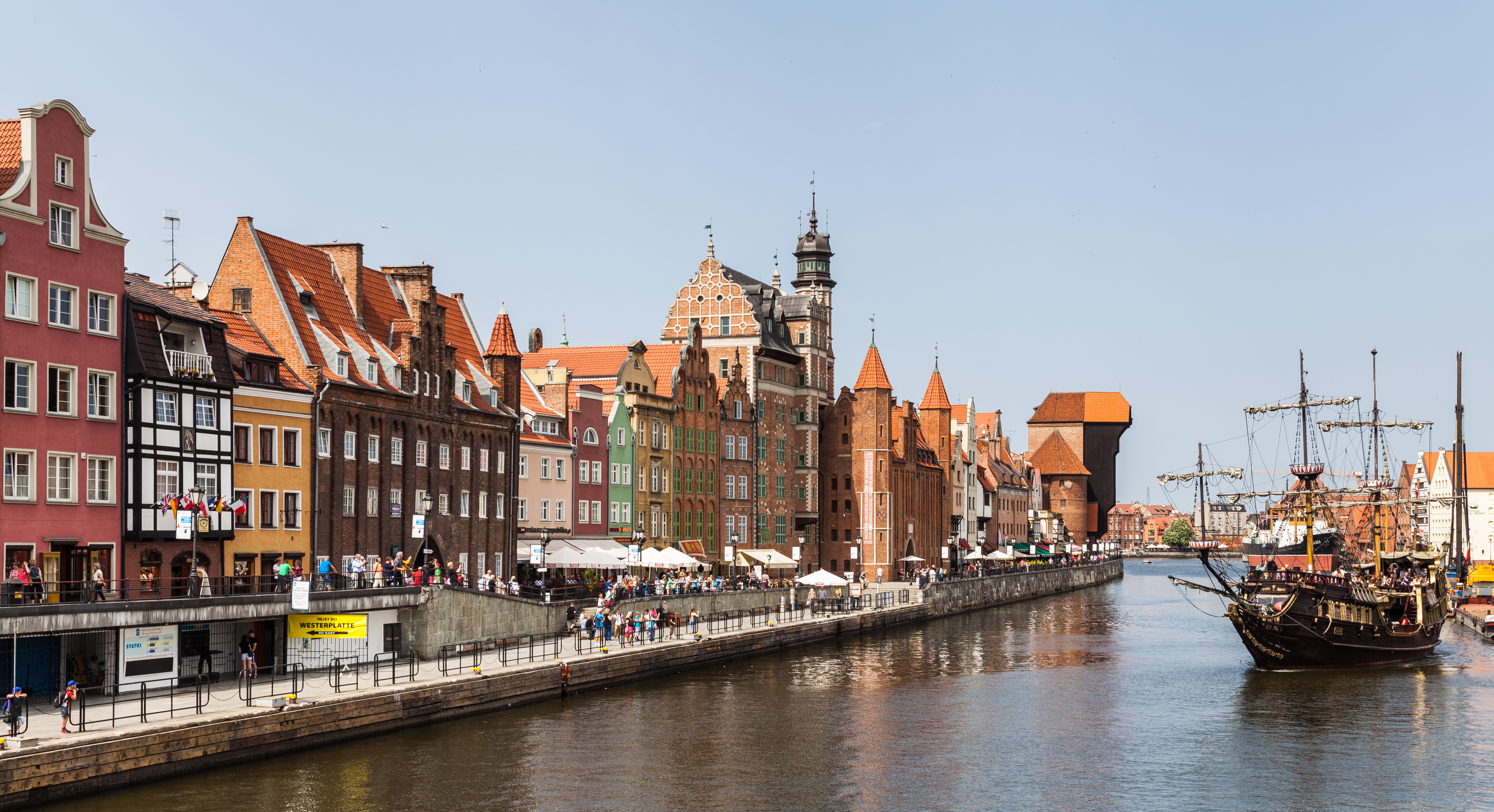
Gdańsk

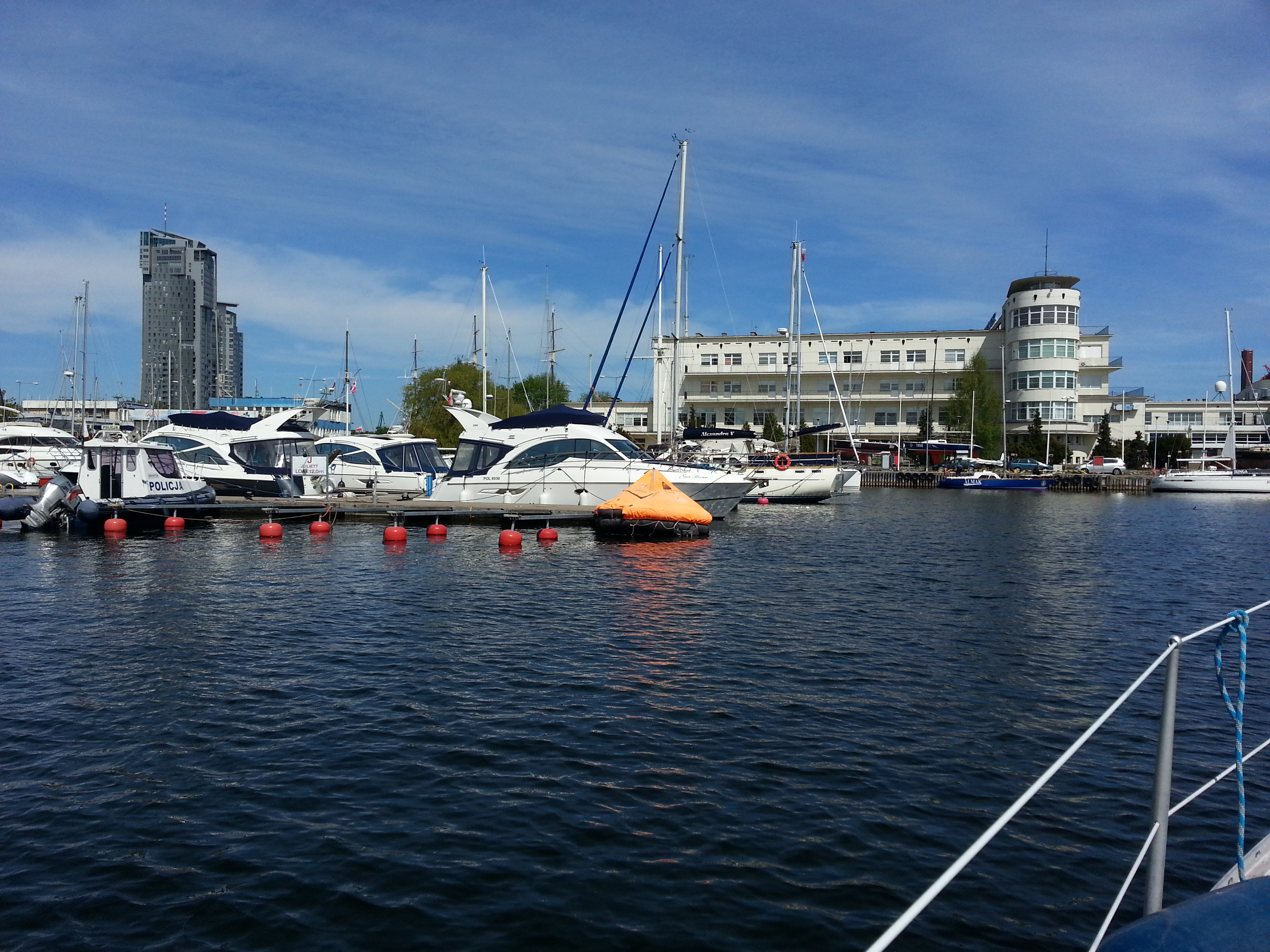
Gdynia

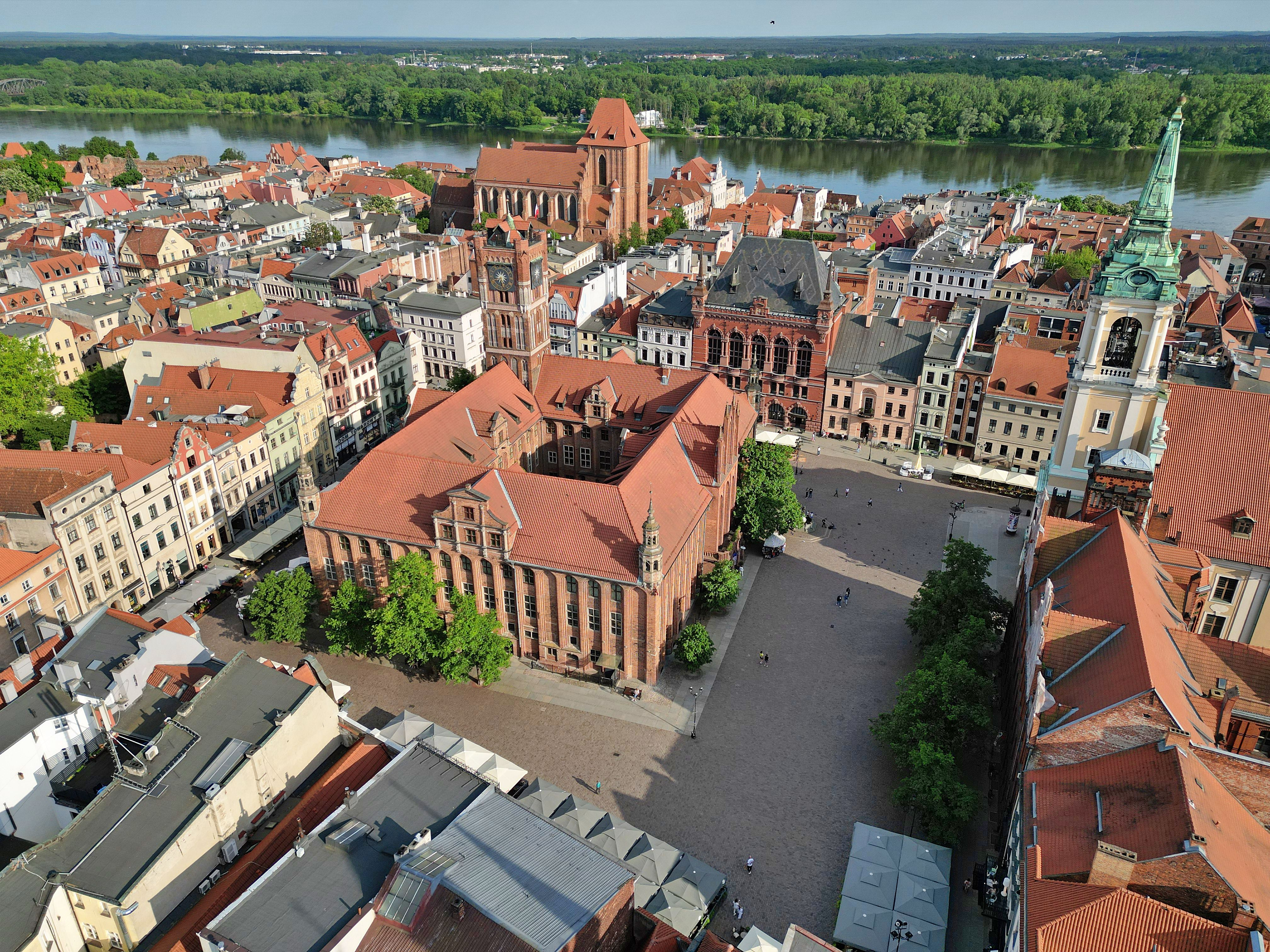
Toruń

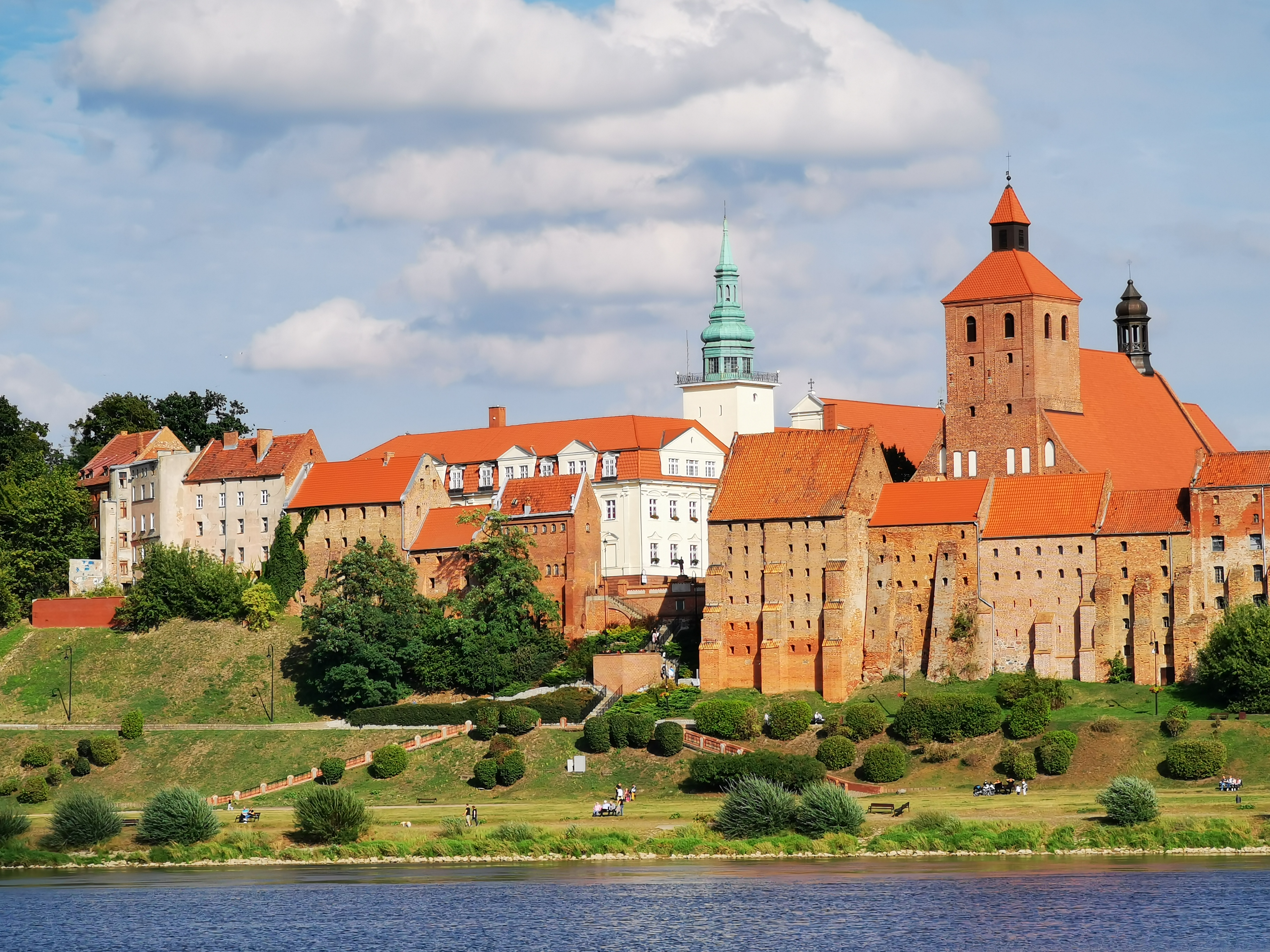
Grudziądz

== Culture ==
=== Languages and dialects ===
Polish is the dominating language in the Polish part of Pomerania. Kashubian dialects are also spoken by the Kashubians in Pomerelia.

In the German part of Pomerania, Standard German dominates. The historical German dialects of Pomerania are, however, Low German. The Pomeranian dialects were all part of the East Low German subgroup: Mecklenburgisch-Vorpommersch in the west, Central Pomeranian (Mittelpommersch) in Central Pomerania around Szczecin (then Stettin), and East Pomeranian in the east. The regions east of the Piaśnica river are not considered Pomeranian according to German terminology, but either West Prussian or Pomerelian. Danzig German was hence classified as Low Prussian, like the dialects of East Prussia (Königsberg).

Those parts of Pomerania that remained German after 1945 are almost entirely located in the Mecklenburgisch-Vorpommersch area. Only the regions between the Zarow river in the west and the Oder river in the east are historically part of the Central Pomeranian dialect region: the southern shores of the Szczecin Lagoon (Ueckermünde), the towns along the Uecker and Randow rivers, and those parts of Pomerania that are now in Brandenburg (Gartz and the northern districts of Schwedt/Oder). Central Pomeranian is also spoken along the historically Brandenburgian headwaters of the Uecker river (Prenzlau). In Mecklenburg-Vorpommern, however, the dominating Low German standard version is the Mecklenburgisch-Vorpommersch dialect, and Central Pomeranian texts are often rewritten.

East Pomeranian, Low Prussian, and Standard German were dominating east of the Oder-Neisse line before most of its speakers were expelled after World War II. Kashubian and East Low German are also spoken by the descendants of émigrées, most notably in the Americas (e.g. Argentina, Brazil, Chile and Canada). Slovincian was spoken at the Farther Pomeranian–Pomerelian frontier, but is now extinct.

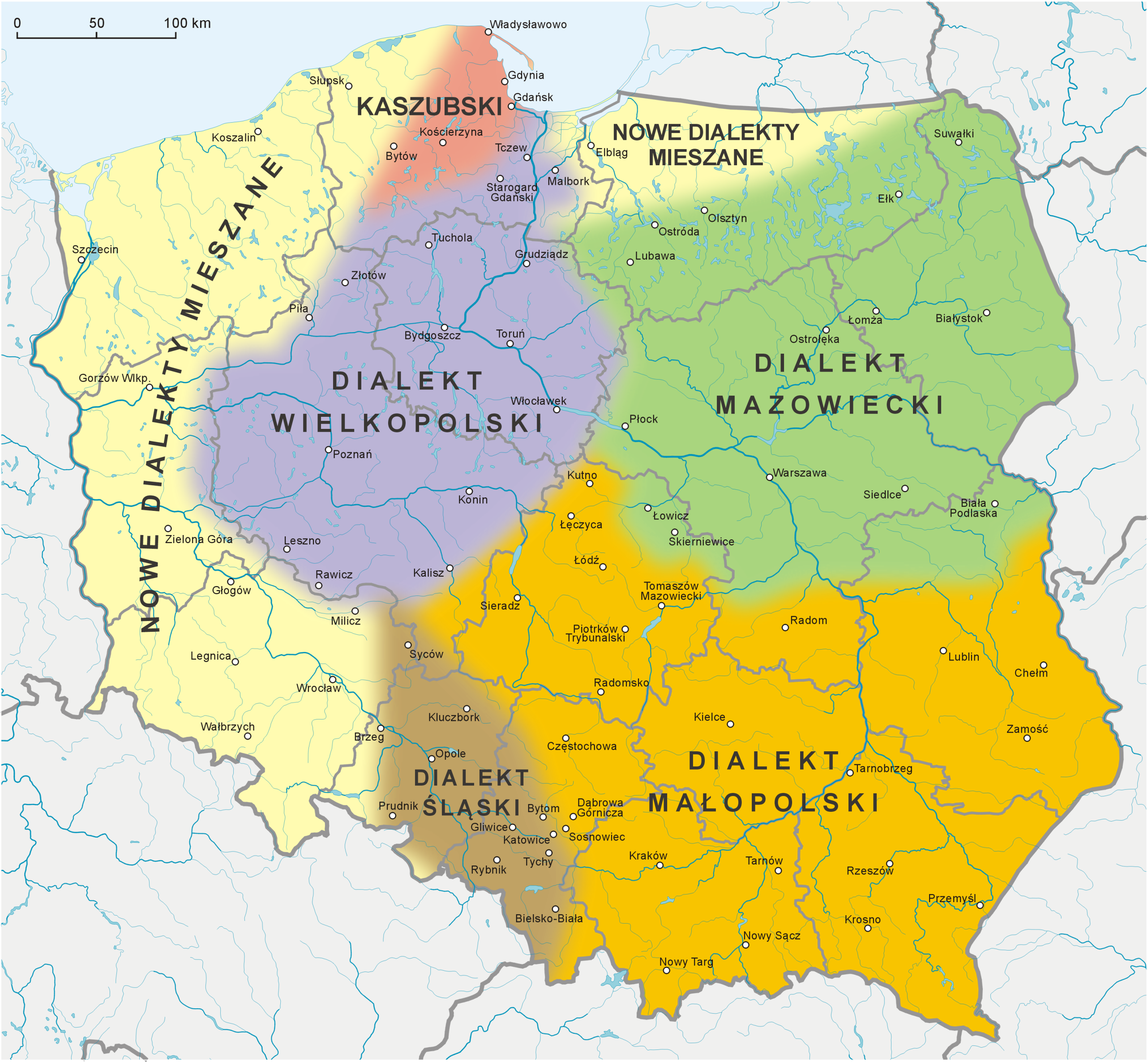
A map of Polish dialects. The Pomorze region contains the Kashubian language and a mix of Polish dialects from other parts of the country.

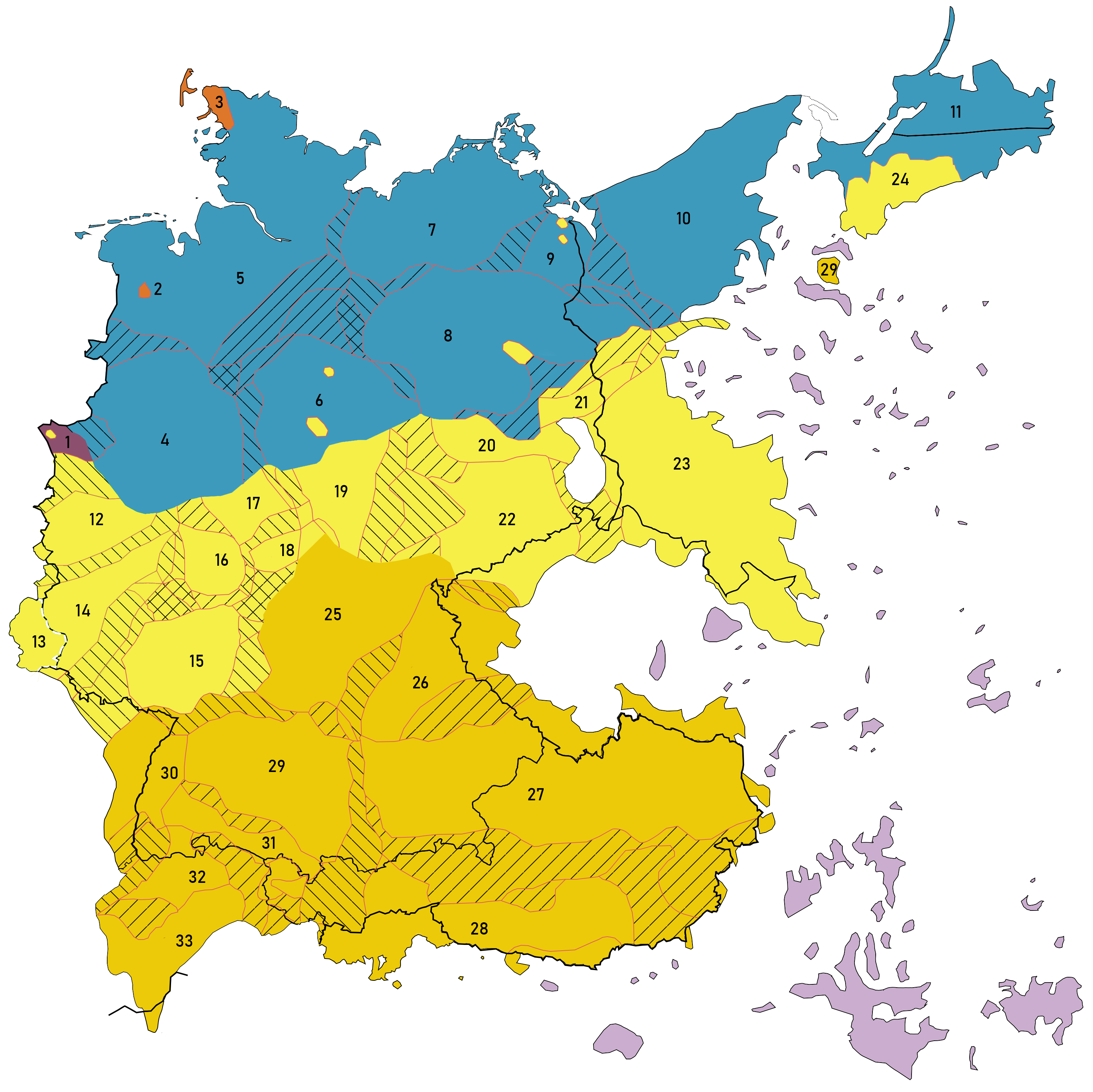
Pomerania historically lay in the Low German dialect region: Mecklenburgisch-Vorpommersch, Central Pomeranian (on the map:Mittelpommerisch) and East Pomeranian (on the map: Hinterpommerisch) dialects. The regions east of the Piaśnica river are not regarded as speaking East Pomeranian according to German terminology, and the Low German dialects that were spoken there are called Low Prussian.

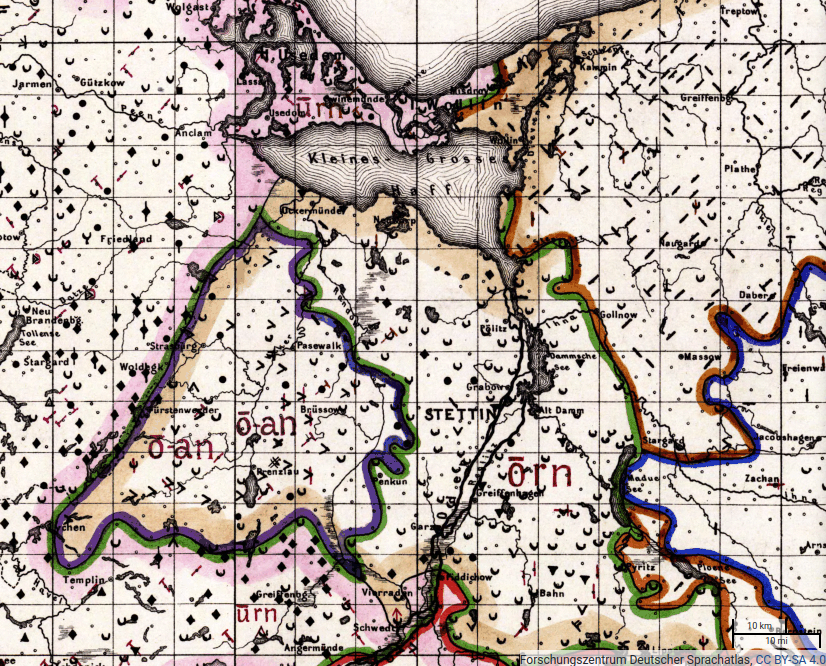
The Central Pomeranian dialect region of Low German, east of the Zarow and north of the Welse, where "Ohren" (ears) is pronounced like "oan" and "orn" (now bounded by the Oder-Neisse line in the east)

=== Cuisine ===
For typical food and beverages of the region, see Pomeranian cuisine.

=== Museums ===
==== Museums in the Polish part ====
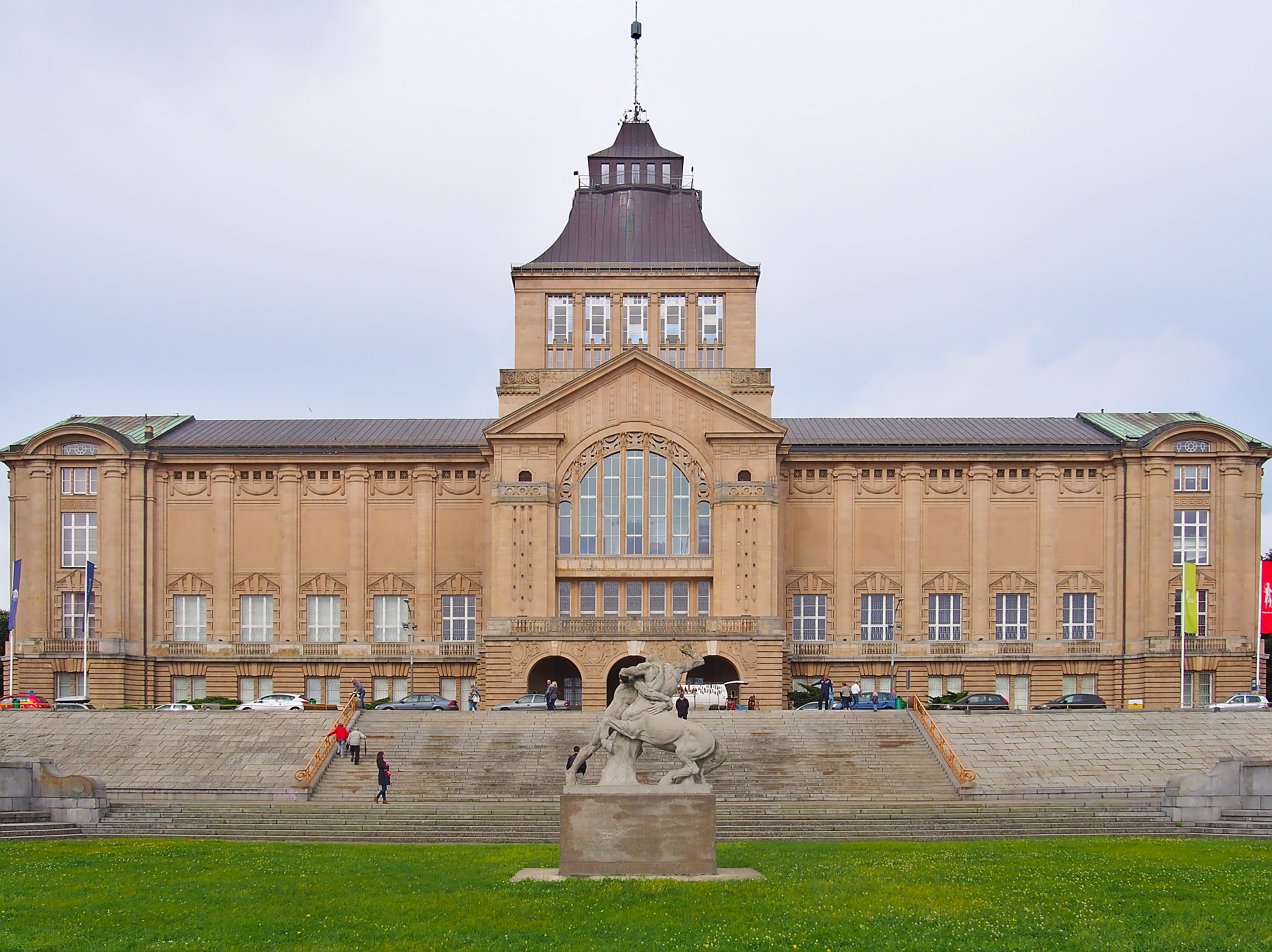
National Museum in Szczecin

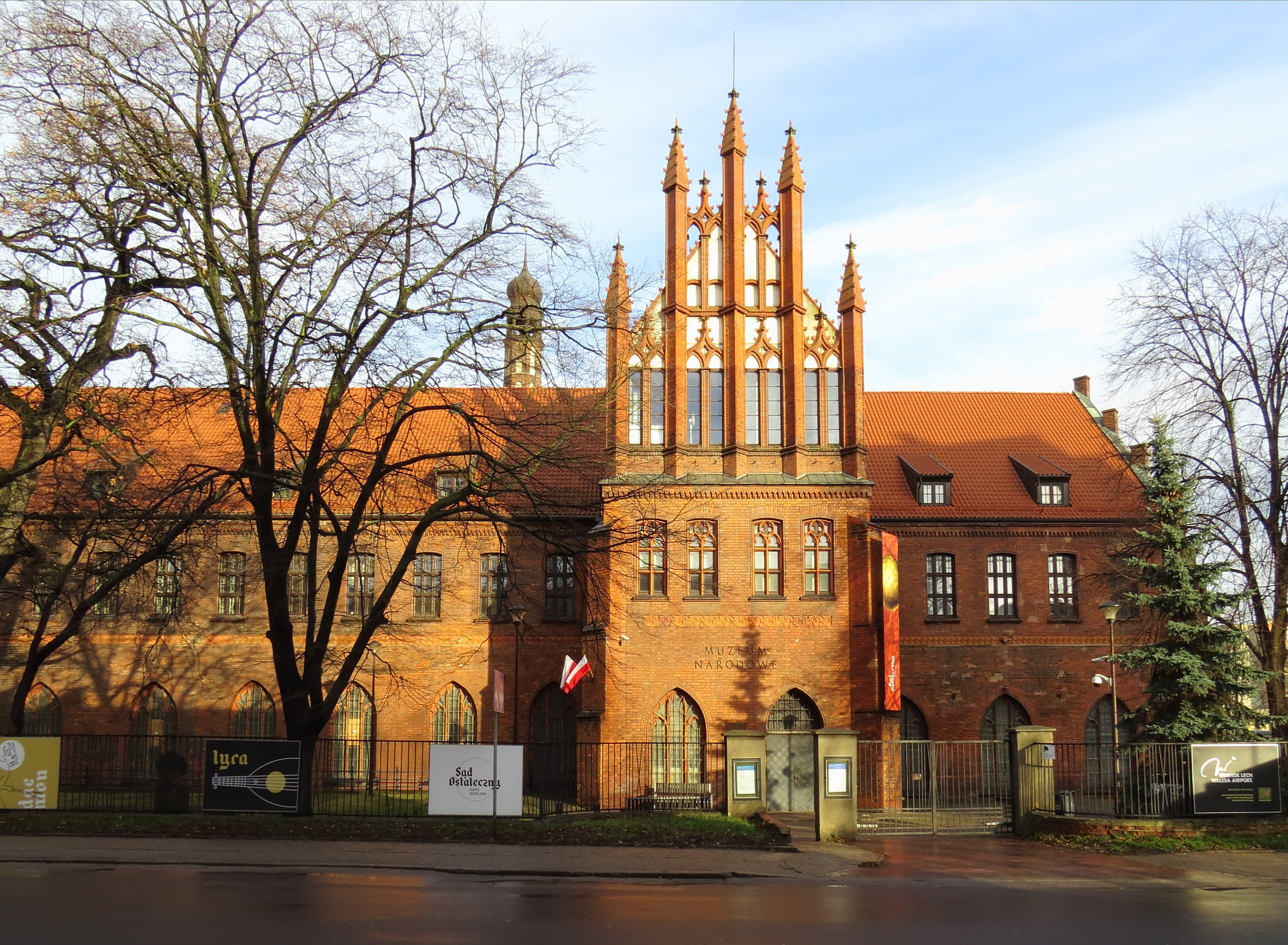
National Museum in Gdańsk

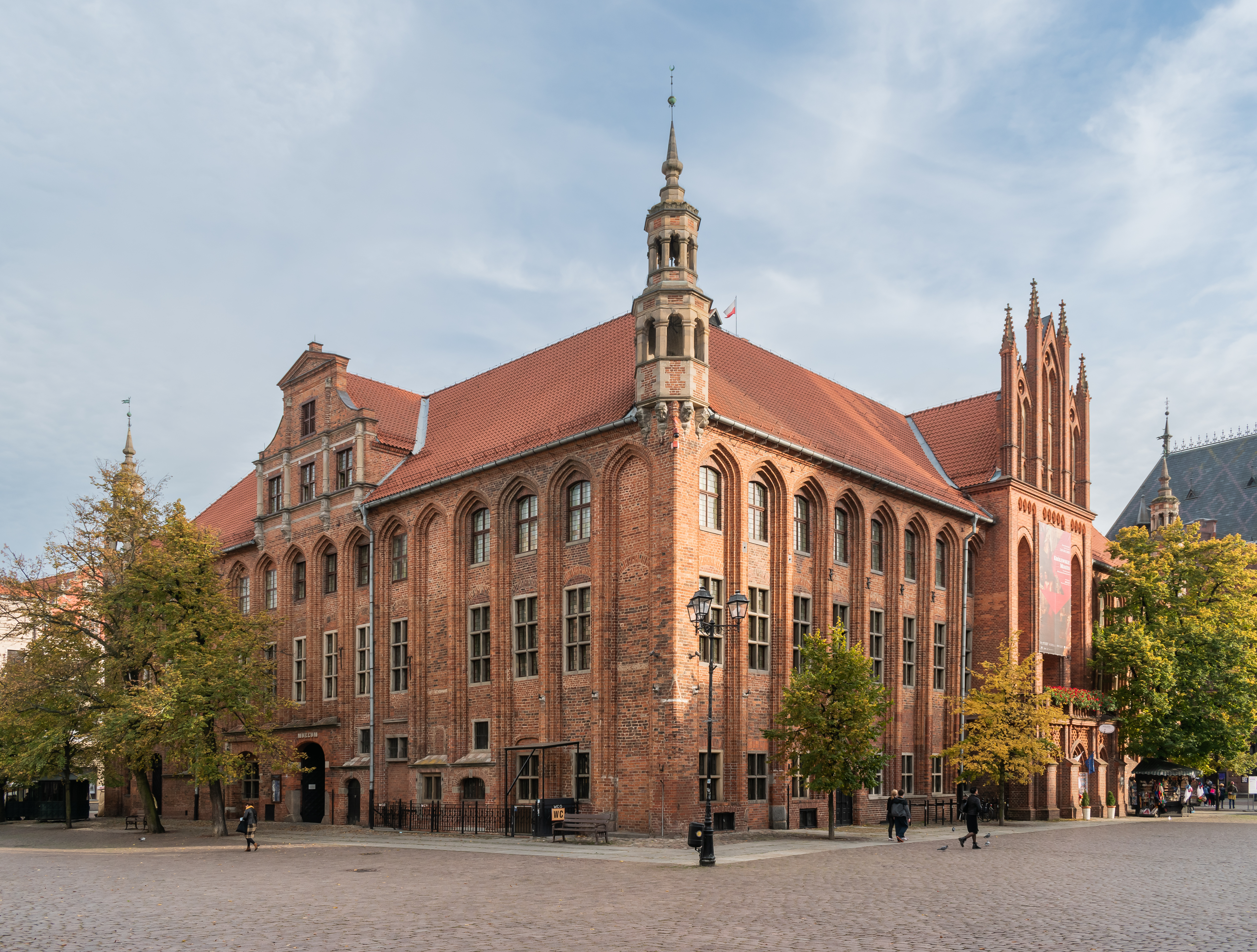
District Museum in Toruń

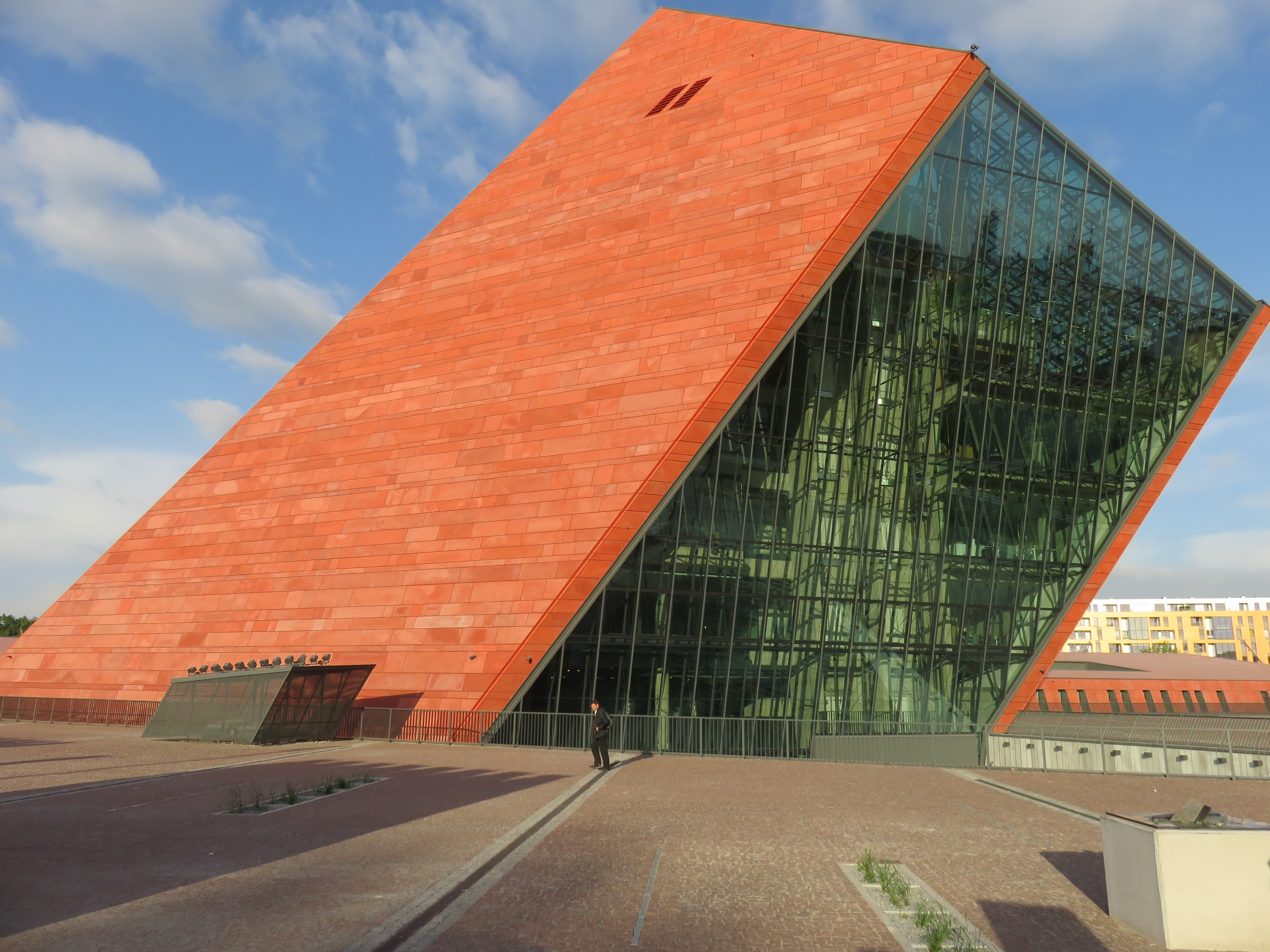
Museum of the Second World War in Gdańsk

At least 50 museums in Poland cover the history of Pomerania, the most important of them being the District Museum in Toruń, the Museum in Grudziądz, the National Museum in Gdańsk, the National Maritime Museum, Gdańsk, the Museum of Sopot, the Emigration Museum in Gdynia, the Museum of Polish Navy in Gdynia, the Museum of Kociewie in Starogard Gdański, the Museum of Kashubian and Pomeranian Literature and Music in Wejherowo, the Kashubian Museum in Kartuzy, the Central Pomerania Museum in Słupsk, the Darłowo Museum, the Koszalin Museum, the Museum of Archaeology and History in Stargard, the National Museum in Szczecin, the Museum of the Puck Region, and the Museum of Maritime Fisheries in Świnoujście.

Other notable museums include the Museum of the National Anthem (Muzeum Hymnu Narodowego) in Będomin at the birthplace of Józef Wybicki, author of the lyrics of the national anthem of Poland, and the Copernicus House in Toruń, birthplace of famed astronomer Nicolaus Copernicus. The Diocesan Museum in Pelplin contains one of the finest collections of medieval art in Poland, and the country's sole copy of the Gutenberg Bible. Medieval open-air museums are the Grodzisko in Sopot and Skansen in Wolin. The Museum of Polish Arms in Kołobrzeg contains a collection of militaria related to the military of Poland from the Early Middle Ages to the present. There are also the Dar Pomorza, ORP Błyskawica and SS Sołdek museum ships.

Several museums devoted to World War II history are located in Polish Pomerania, including the Museum of the Second World War in Gdańsk, the Guardhouse no. 1 at Westerplatte (a branch of the Museum of Gdańsk), the Museum of Coastal Defence in Hel, the Stutthof Museum in Sztutowo with the branch Piaśnica Museum in Wejherowo, the Museum of the Pomeranian Wall and World War II in Szczecinek, and the Armory Museum in Kłanino.

There are also aquaria: the Gdynia Aquarium and the Seal Sanctuary in Hel.

Other museums include the Amber Museums in Gdańsk and Jarosławiec, and the Museum of Gingerbread in Toruń.

==== Museums in the German part ====
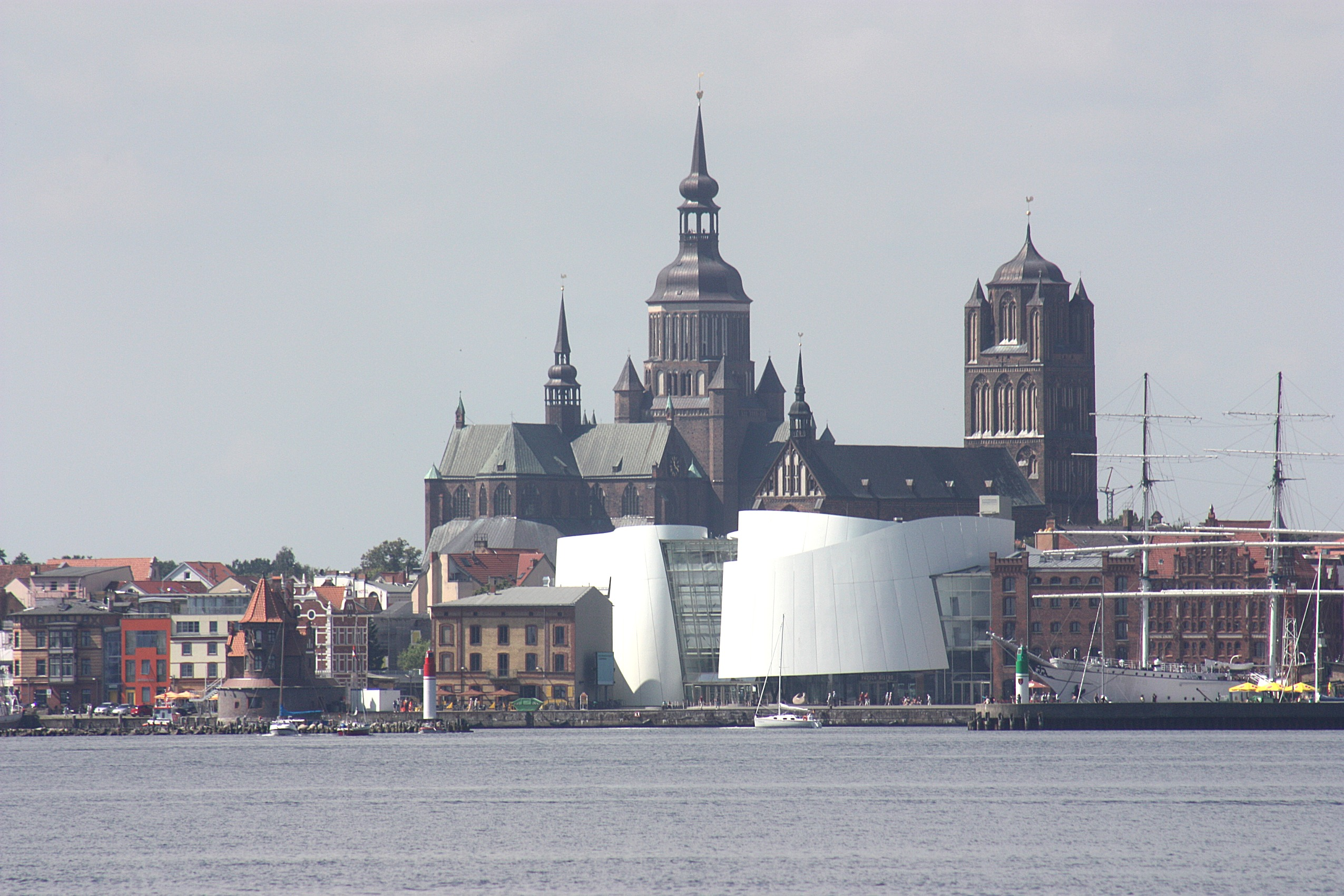
Ozeaneum in Stralsund

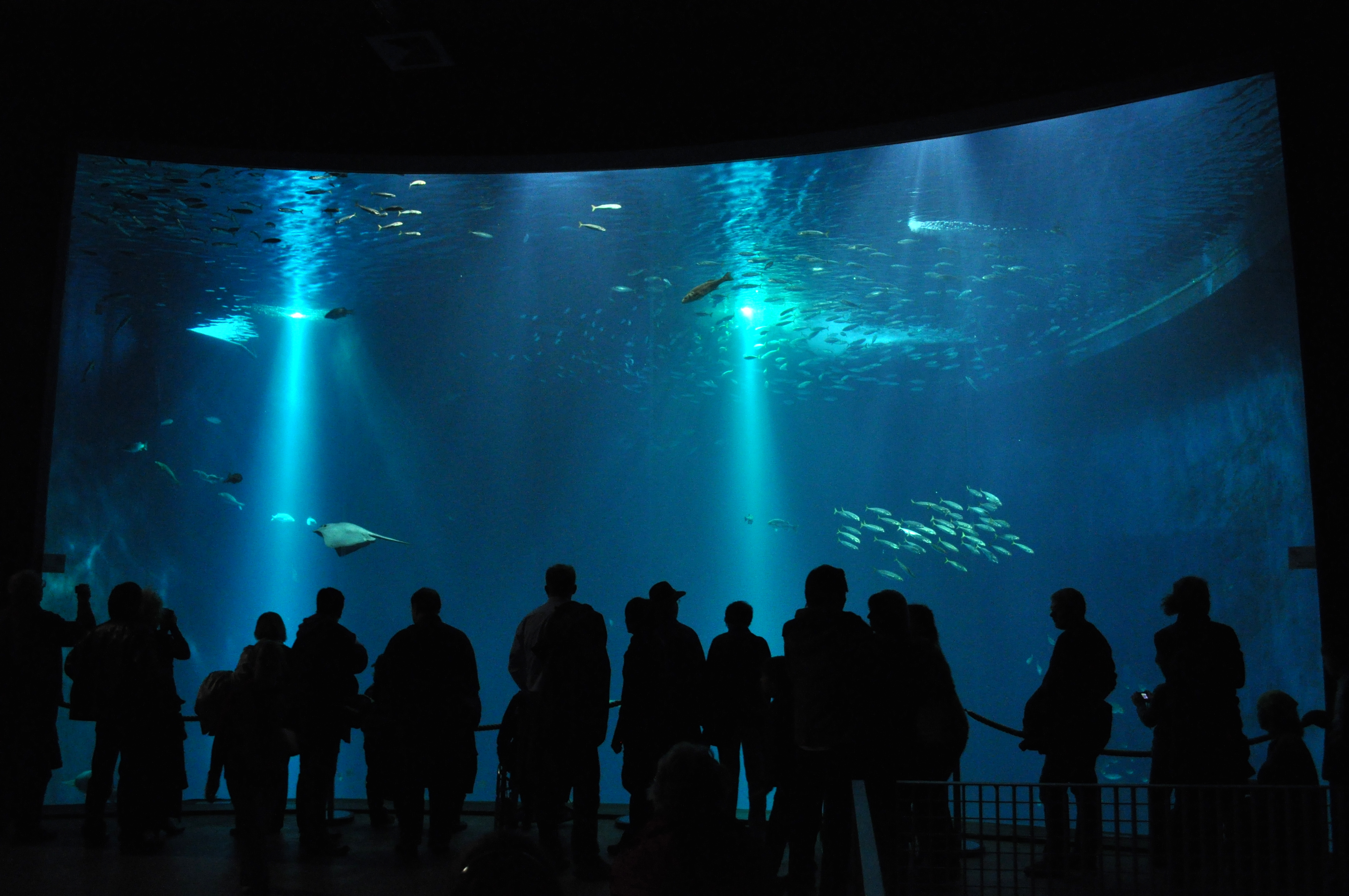
Inside the Ozeaneum

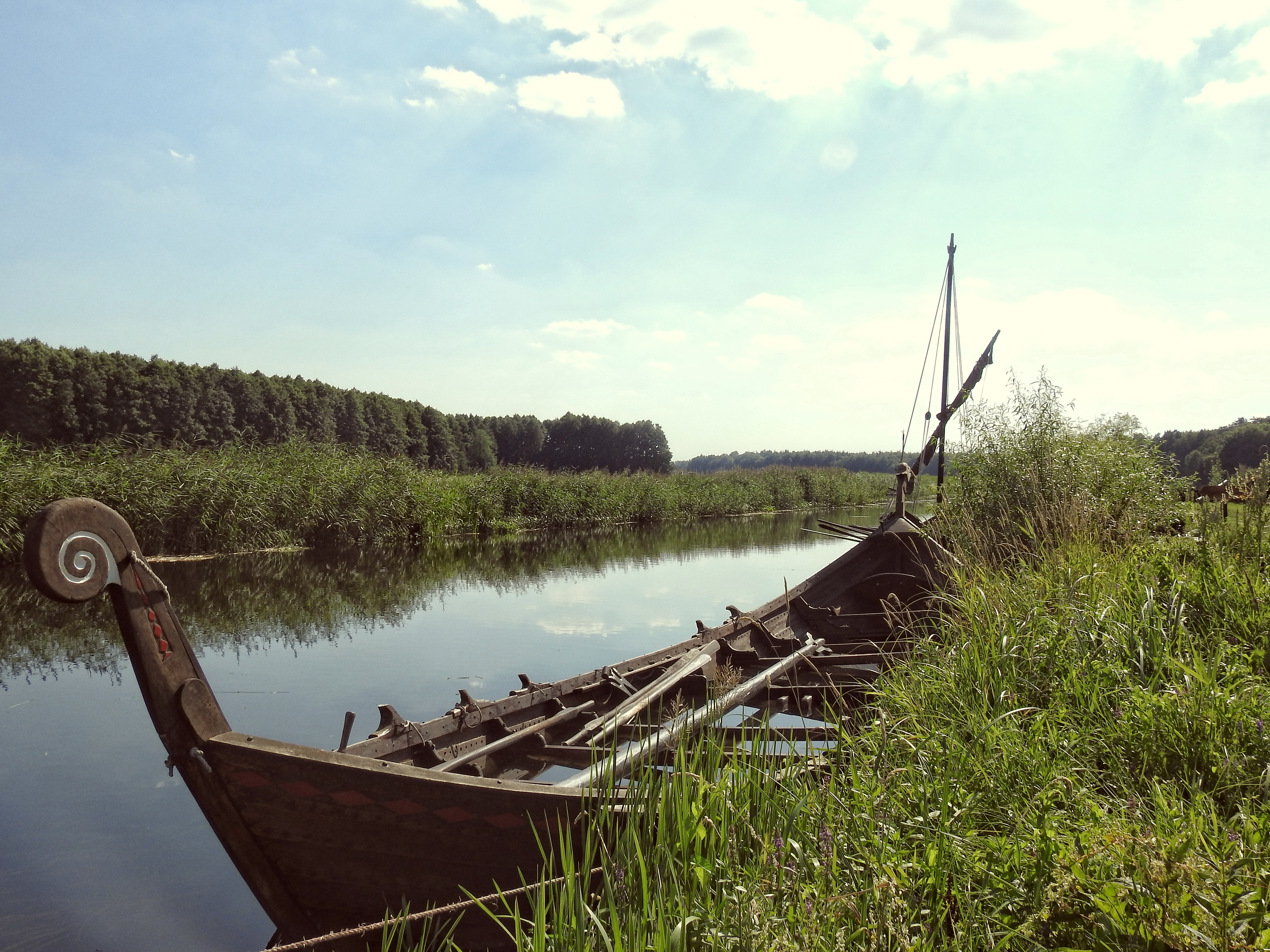
Ukranenland in Torgelow

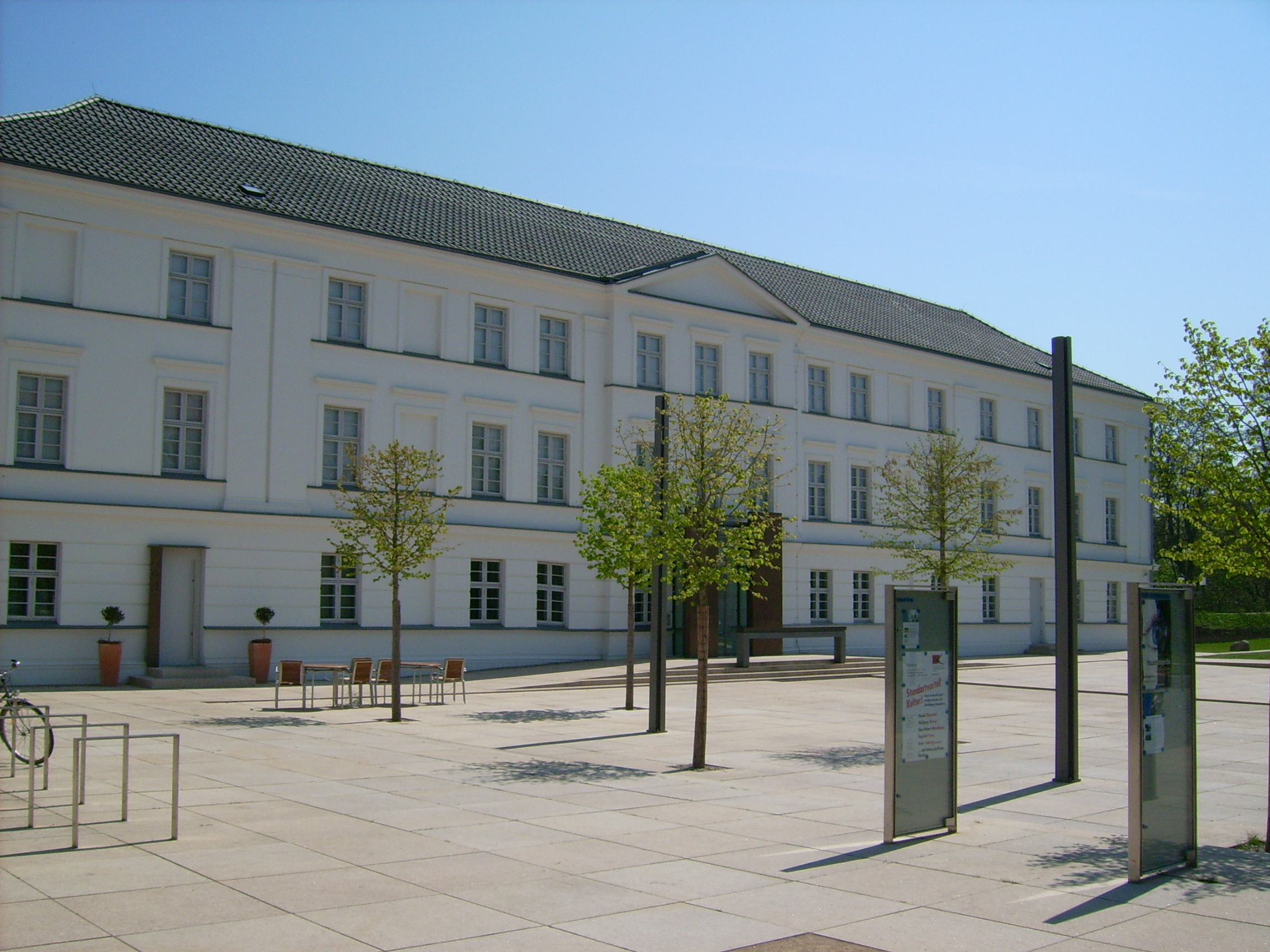
Pomeranian State Museum in Greifswald

There are around 40 museums in the district of Vorpommern-Rügen, the most notable of which are:

- the "Foundation German Oceanographic Museum" in Stralsund, which runs four locations: the German Oceanographic Museum, which is housed in the former St. Catherine's Monastery in Stralsund, the Ozeaneum Stralsund (a natural history museum with a focus on the sea), the Nautineum on the Dänholm, and the Natureum in Born auf dem Darß.
- the Stralsund Museum, which houses a Svantevit Stone, the Hiddensee treasure and the Peenemünde gold rings.
- the Navy Museum Dänholm (Marinemuseum Dänholm), the Dänholm being the cradle of the German Navy.
- the German Amber Museum in Ribnitz-Damgarten, located in the former monastery of the Order of Saint Clare in Ribnitz.
- the Bibelzentrum Barth, which shows one of the Barth Bibles, that were printed in 1588 in Middle Low German by the Ducal Printing House Barth (Herzogliche Druckerei Barth), founded by Bogislaw XIII, Duke of Pomerania.
- the Granitz Hunting Lodge with among others, the exhibition "Deers of the world" is Mecklenburg-Vorpommern's most visited castle.
- the West Pomeranian Potato Museum in Tribsees, one of three German potato museums.
- the crane museum (Kranich Museum) in Saal, dedicated to all kinds of cranes.

In the district of Vorpommern-Greifswald are located around 30 museums, among which:

- the Pomeranian State Museum, the collections of which include the famous Croÿ-Carpet and various paintings by Caspar David Friedrich and Vincent van Gogh.
- the Peenemünde Historical Technical Museum, where the only rockets in the territory of Pomerania are exhibited.
- the Museumshafen Greifswald is Germany's largest museum harbour.
- Ukranenland, an archaeological open-air museum on the banks of the Uecker in Torgelow, which is modeled on an early medieval Slavic village. It depicts the life of the Ukrani, the Elbe Slavic tribe once native to the Uckermark.

=== Education ===
==== Universities ====
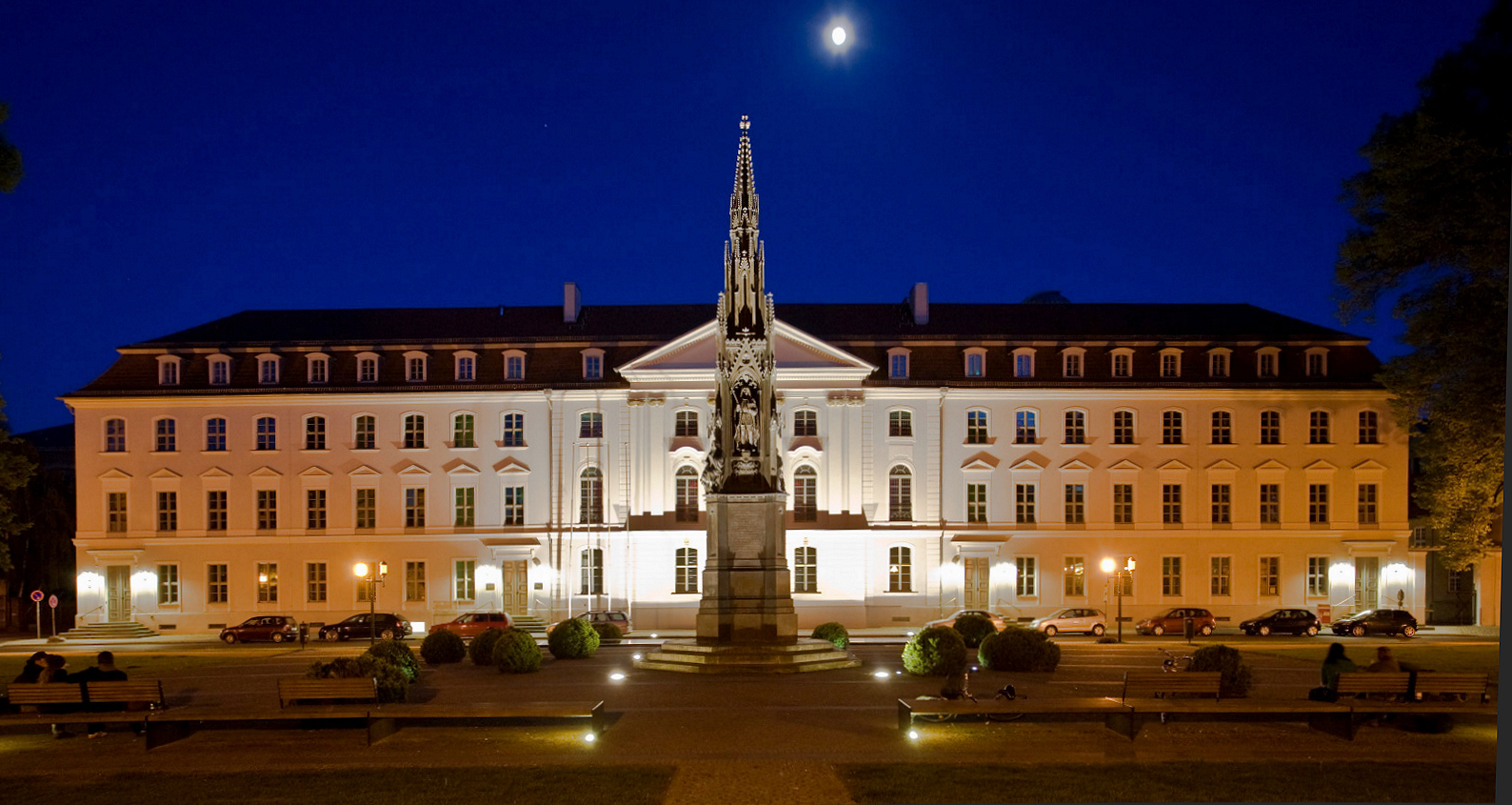
The University of Greifswald, founded in 1456 (teaching since 1436), is the oldest university in Pomerania.

There are four traditional (non-profiled and multi-faculty, public research) universities in the region, namely the University of Greifswald, the University of Szczecin, the University of Gdańsk and the Nicolaus Copernicus University in Toruń, the oldest of which, the University of Greifswald, was founded when Greifswald belonged to Duchy of Pomerania, thus being one of the oldest universities in the world.

The technical universities are the Gdańsk University of Technology, West Pomeranian University of Technology in Szczecin, and Koszalin University of Technology.

==== University of Applied Sciences ====
The Stralsund University of Applied Sciences (Hochschule Stralsund) in Stralsund has around 2,400 students.

== Economy ==
Agriculture primarily consists of raising livestock, forestry, fishery, and the cultivation of cereals, sugar beets, and potatoes. Industrial food processing is increasingly relevant in the region. Key producing industries are shipyards, mechanical engineering facilities (i.e. renewable energy components), and sugar refineries, along with paper and wood fabricators. Service industries today are an important economical factor in Pomerania, most notably with logistics, information technology, life science, biotechnology, health care, and other high-tech branches often clustering around research facilities of the Pomeranian universities.

Since the late 19th century, tourism has been an important sector of the economy, primarily in the numerous seaside resorts along the coast.

The Polish Świnoujście LNG terminal is located in Pomerania.

== Sports ==
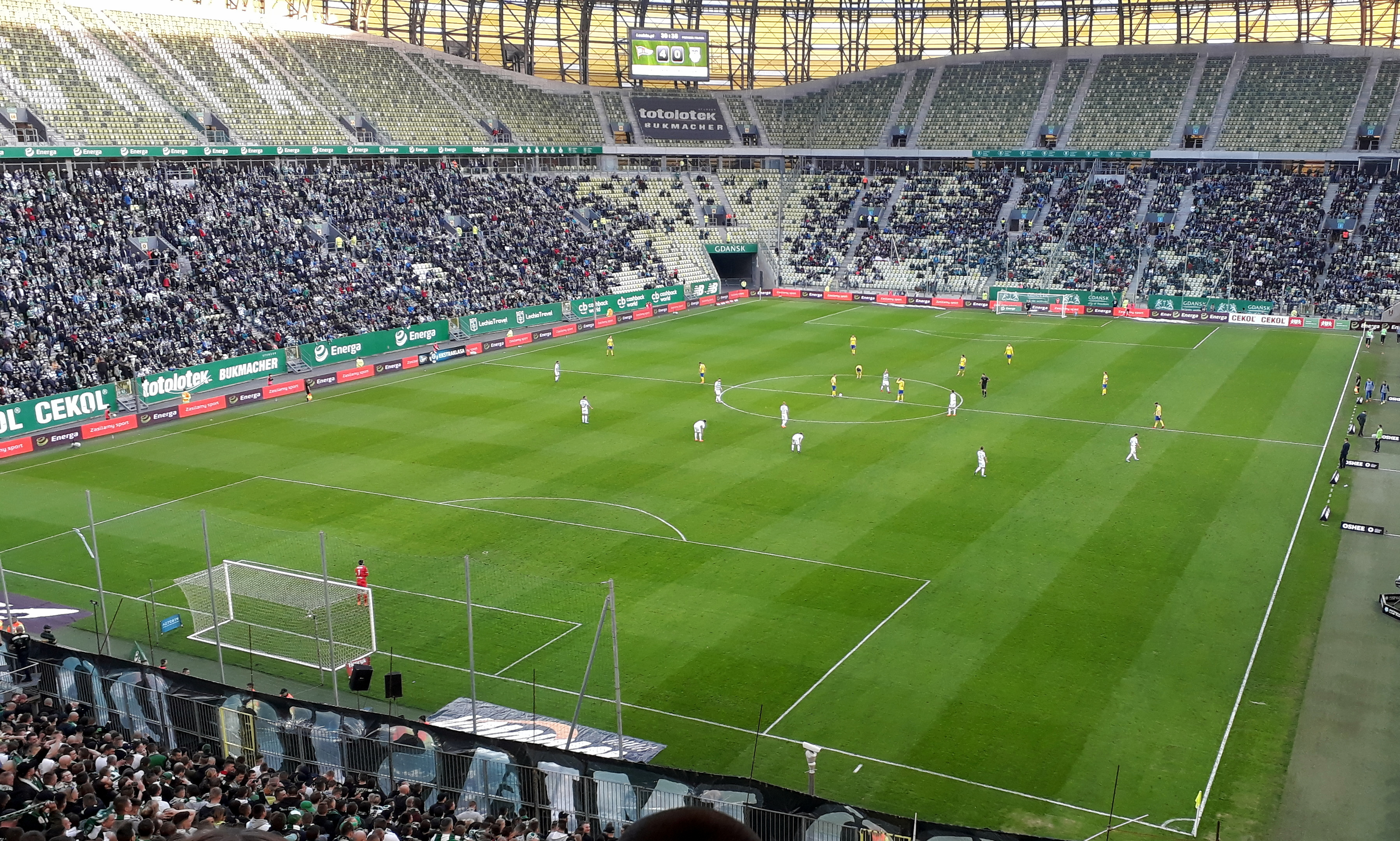
The Tricity Derby, contested by Arka Gdynia and Lechia Gdańsk, is the largest football derby in Pomerania

Sports enjoying either great popularity or success in Pomerania are football, basketball, speedway, handball, volleyball and rugby union.

Most popular and accomplished football teams are Arka Gdynia, Lechia Gdańsk and Pogoń Szczecin, based in the three largest cities.

Among the most successful Polish basketball teams are the Arka Gdynia men's and women's teams. Other popular men's clubs are Czarni Słupsk, Spójnia Stargard, Trefl Sopot, Wilki Morskie Szczecin, SKS Starogard Gdański.

The most successful speedway club is KS Toruń, while other popular teams are Wybrzeże Gdańsk and GKM Grudziądz.

The most successful men's handball team is Wybrzeże Gdańsk, and other popular club is Pogoń Szczecin, whereas successful women's teams are Pogoń Szczecin and Arka Gdynia.

With ten Polish Championship titles KPS Chemik Police is among the most successful women's volleyball clubs in Poland (as of October 2023).

RC Lechia Gdańsk, Ogniwo Sopot and RC Arka Gdynia are all multiple times Polish champions in rugby union, winning a combined total of 28 titles (as of November 2023).

Largest stadiums are Stadion Gdańsk, Stadion Miejski im. Floriana Krygiera in Szczecin, MotoArena Toruń and Stadion Miejski in Gdynia. Main indoor arenas include Ergo Arena in Gdańsk/Sopot, Gdynia Arena in Gdynia and Enea Arena in Szczecin.

== Gallery ==
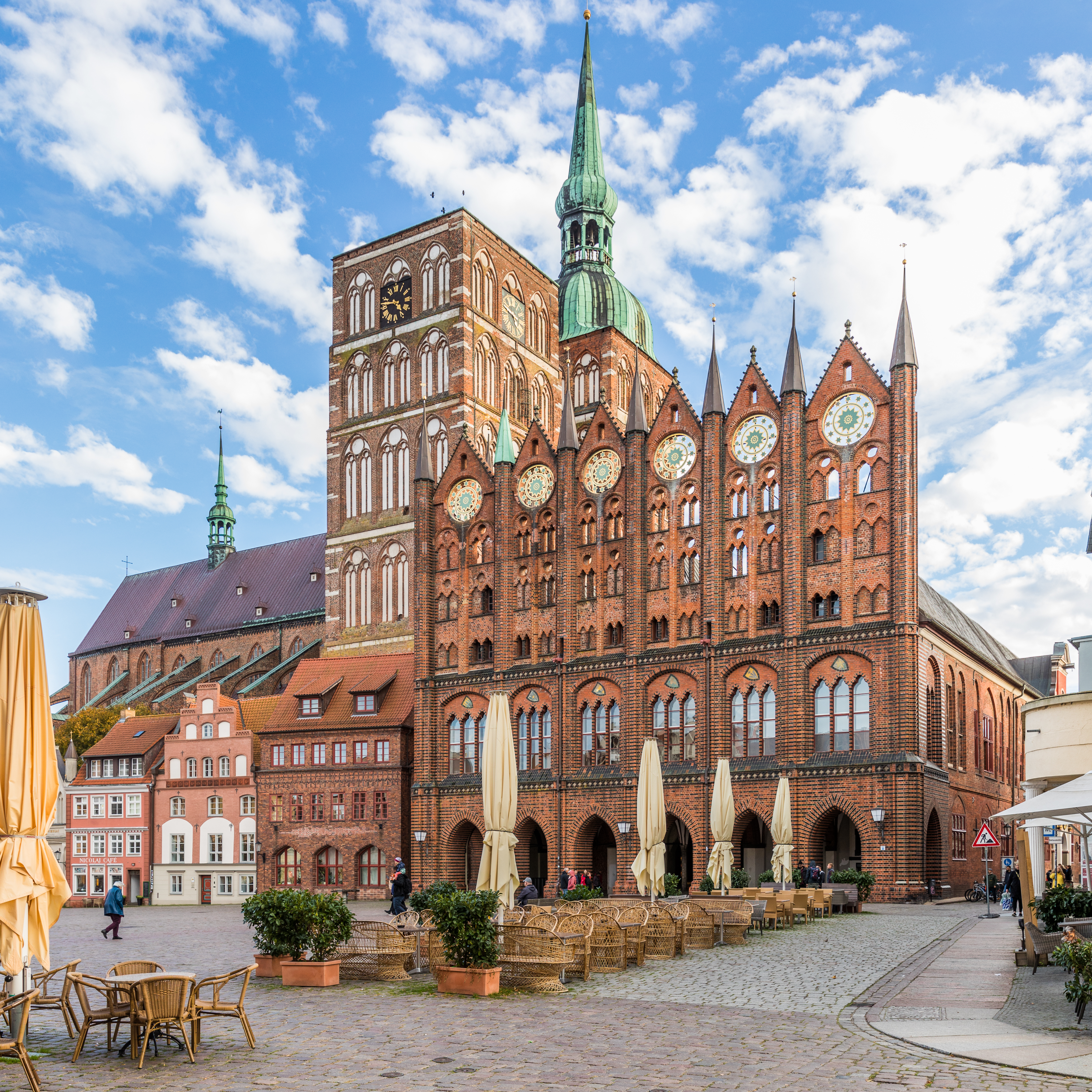
Stralsund, one of several Hanseatic cities built in typical Brick Gothic style

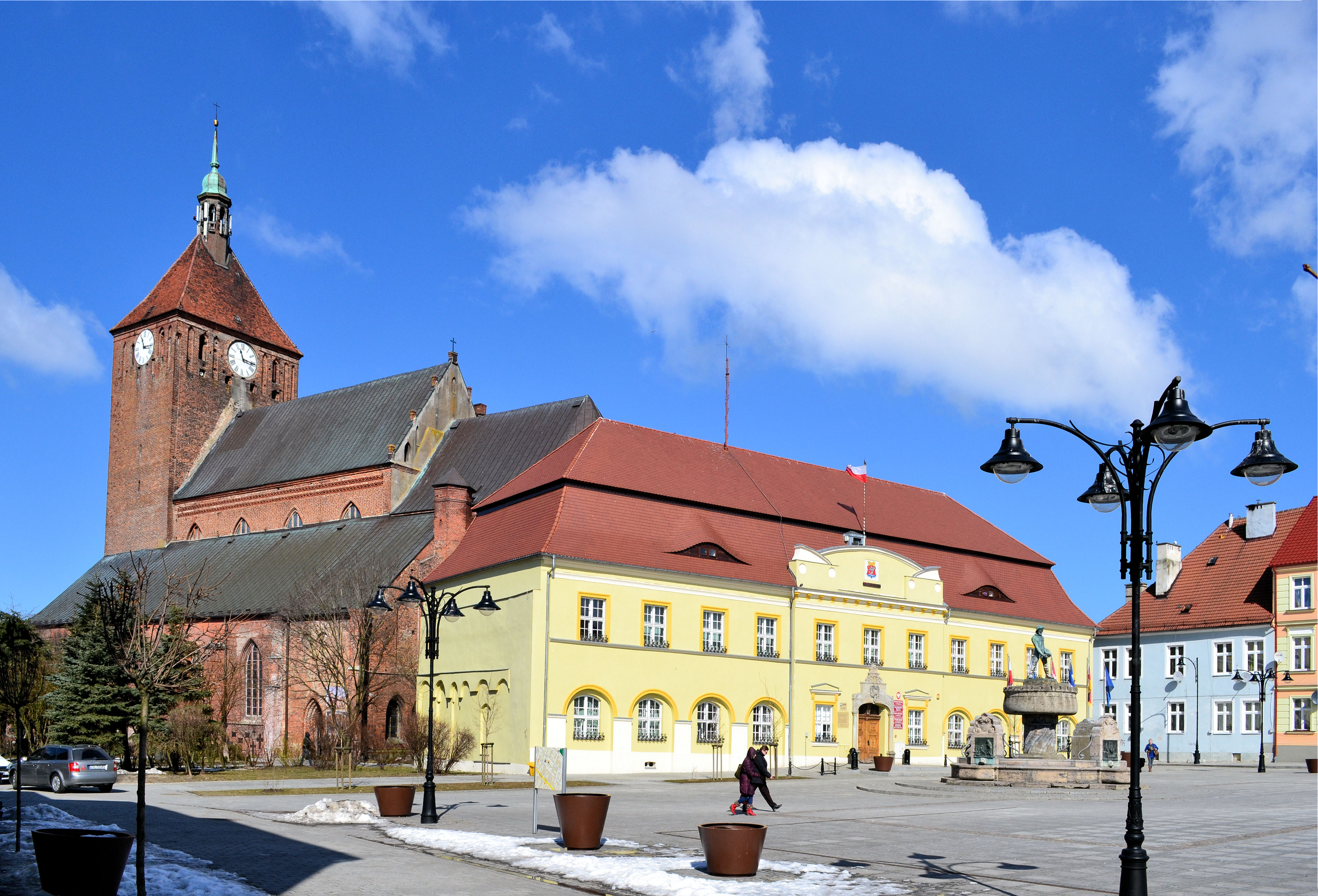
Town Hall and Our Lady of Częstochowa Church in Darłowo

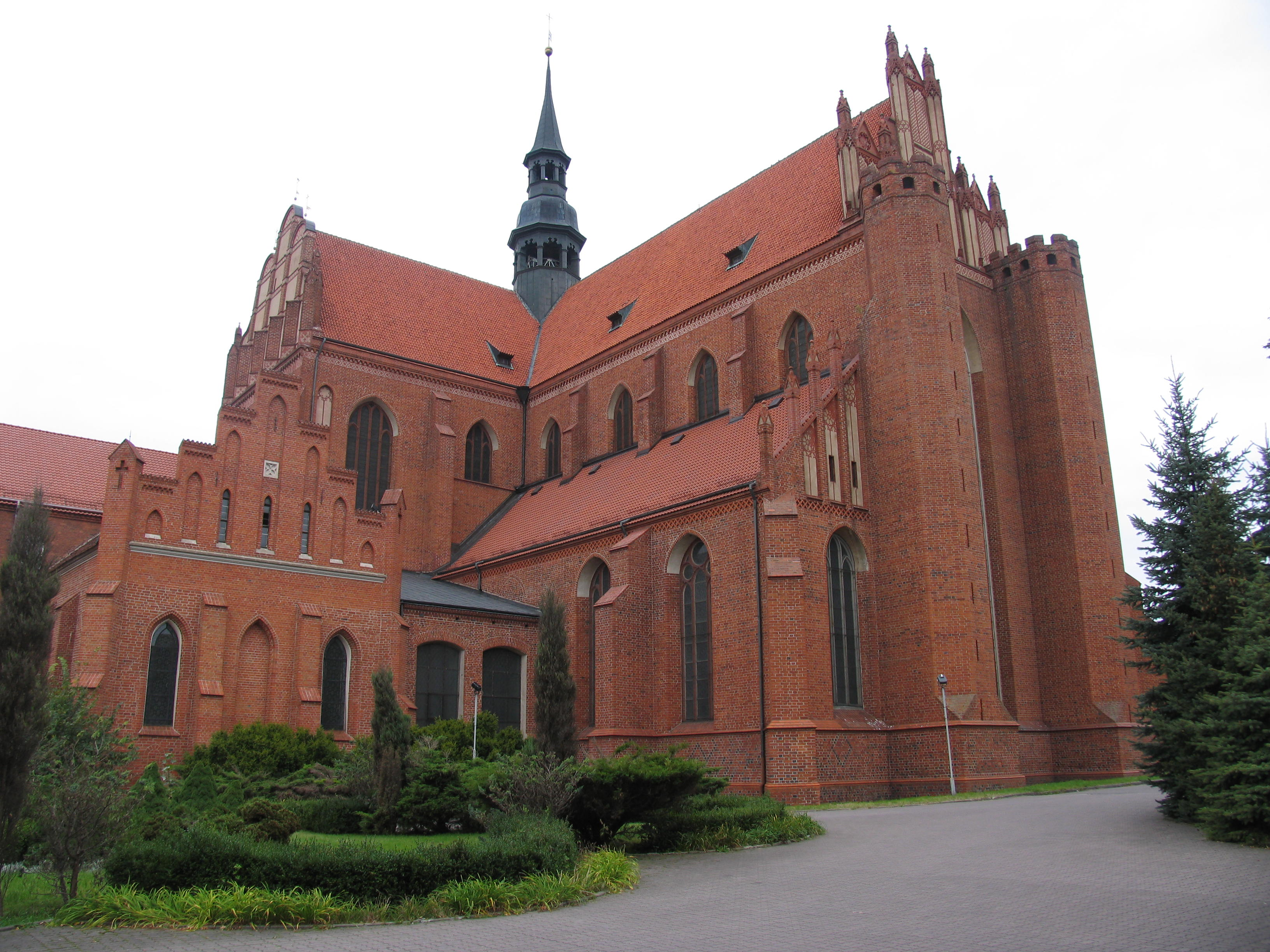
Cathedral Basilica of the Assumption in Pelplin, one of the largest churches in Poland

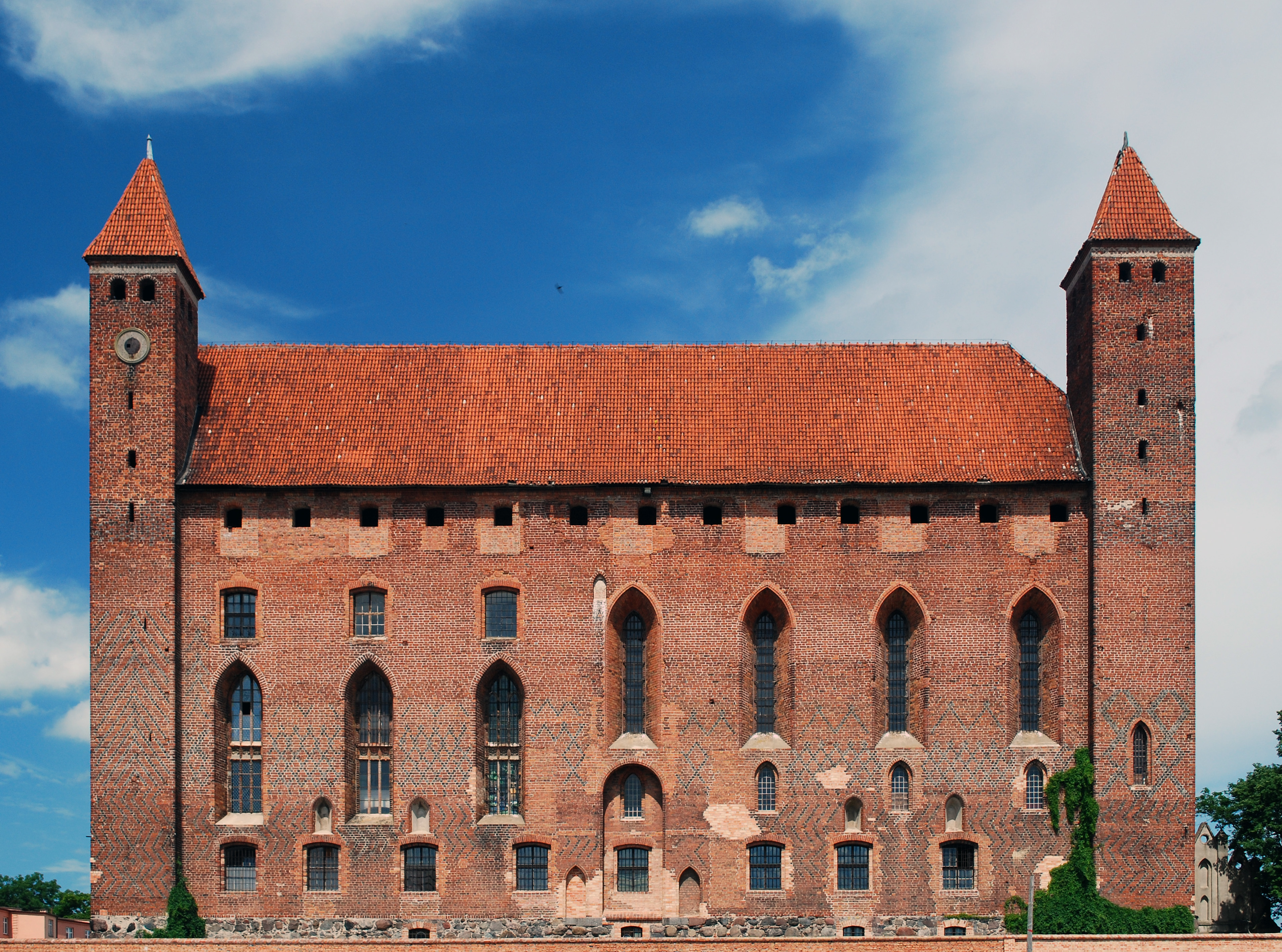
Gniew Castle

== See also ==
- German exonyms (Pomorze)
- Polish exonyms (Western Pomerania)
- History of Pomerania
- Kashubian-Pomeranian Association
- Pomerode
- Eastern Pomerania (disambiguation)
- Western Pomerania (disambiguation)
- Middle Pomerania
- Pomeranian (disambiguation)
- Pomeranian dog
- Pomeranian Coarsewool
