= List of University of Greifswald people =

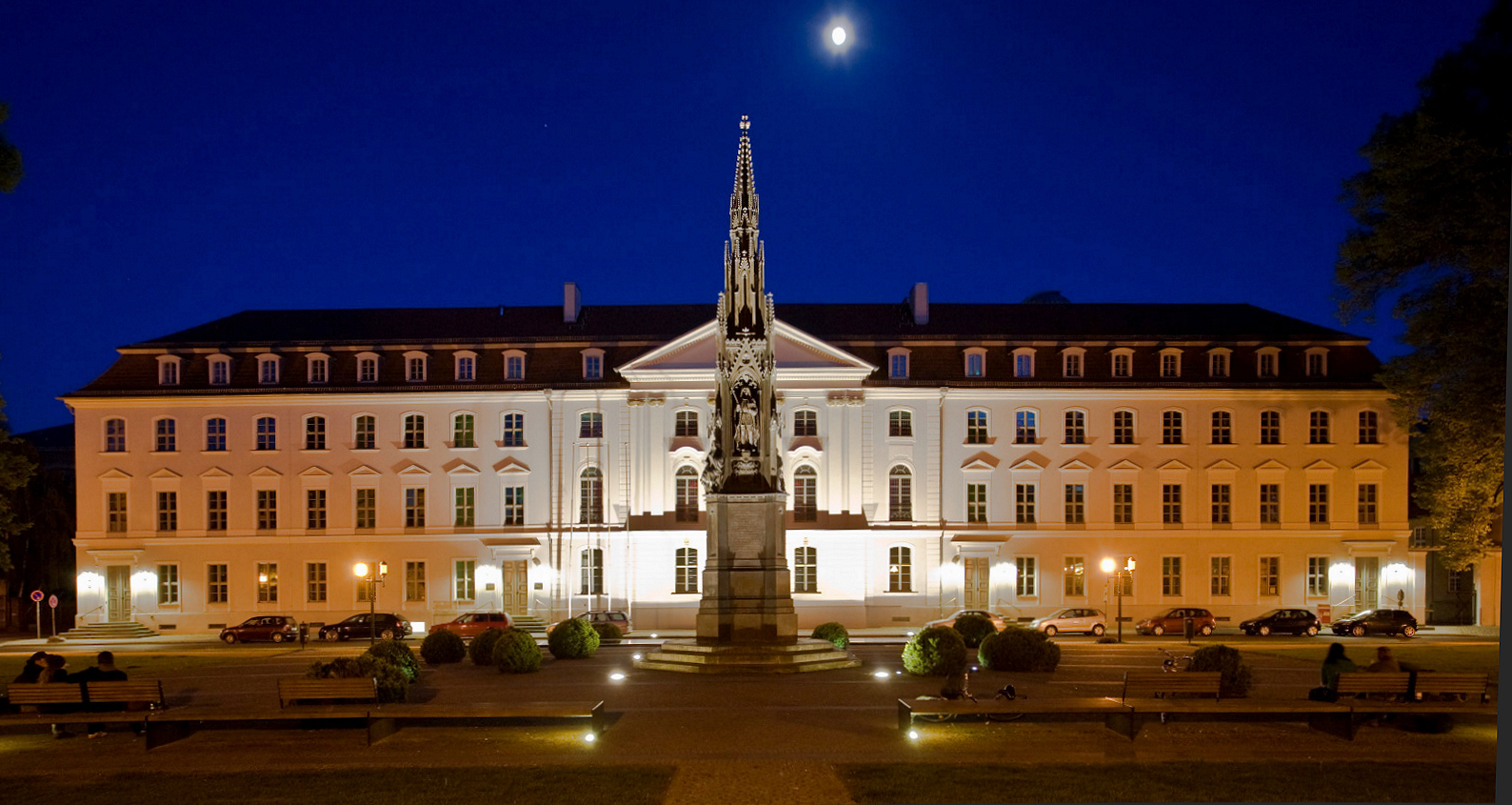
The University of Greifswald in the town of Greifswald, Germany.

This List of people associated with the University of Greifswald contains notable alumni and faculty past and present of an institution of higher education founded as early as 1456.

If alumni subsequently worked at Greifswald University, they are listed under staff.

== Nobel prize laureates ==
- Gerhard Domagk (1895–1964), Nobel Prize in Medicine 1939/1947
- Johannes Stark (1874–1957), Nobel Prize in Physics 1919

== Staff ==
=== Arts and humanities ===
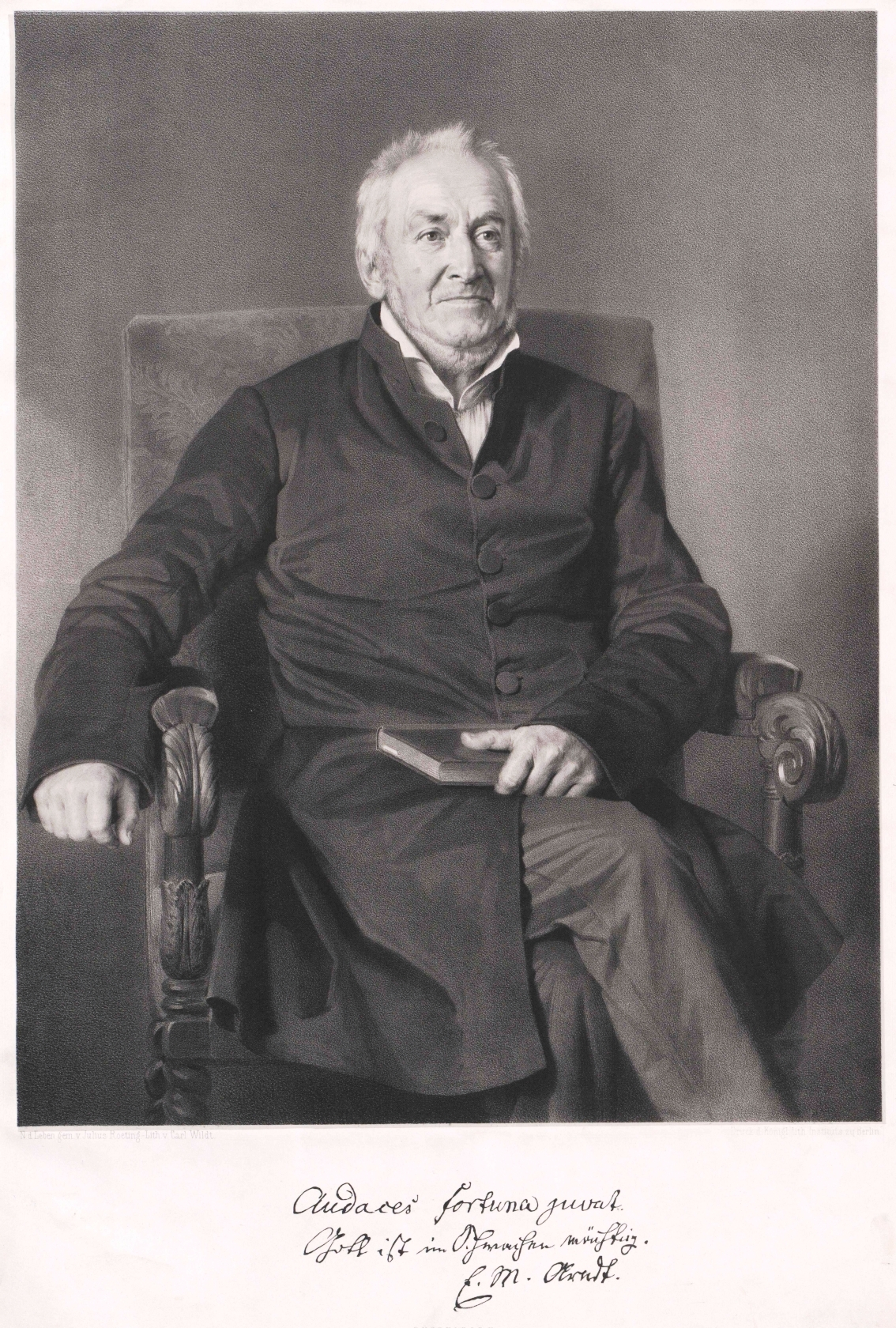
Ernst Moritz Arndt (1769–1860), writer and politician

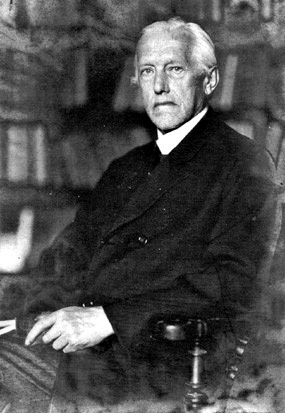
Ulrich von Wilamowitz-Moellendorff, classical philologist

- Ernst Moritz Arndt, writer and politician, rector of the University of Bonn
- Ernst Bernheim
- Alfred Gomolka, Member of the European Parliament
- Günther Jacoby
- Otto Jahn
- Ulrich von Hutten, humanist
- Victor Klemperer
- Gabriele Mucchi, artist
- Carl von Noorden
- Johann Philipp Palthen, historian and philologist
- Georg Friedrich Schömann
- Theodor Siebs
- Thomas Thorild, Swedish poet, critic, feminist and philosopher
- Wilhelm Titel, painter
- Johannes Voigt
- Ulrich von Wilamowitz-Moellendorff, classical philologist
- Werner Buchholz, historian

=== Business and law ===
- Rudolf Agricola
- Jan Degenhardt
- Peter of Ravenna
- Carl Schmitt, political scientist
- Friedrich Spielhagen
- Bernhard Windscheid, co-writer of the German civil law code

=== Mathematics and sciences ===
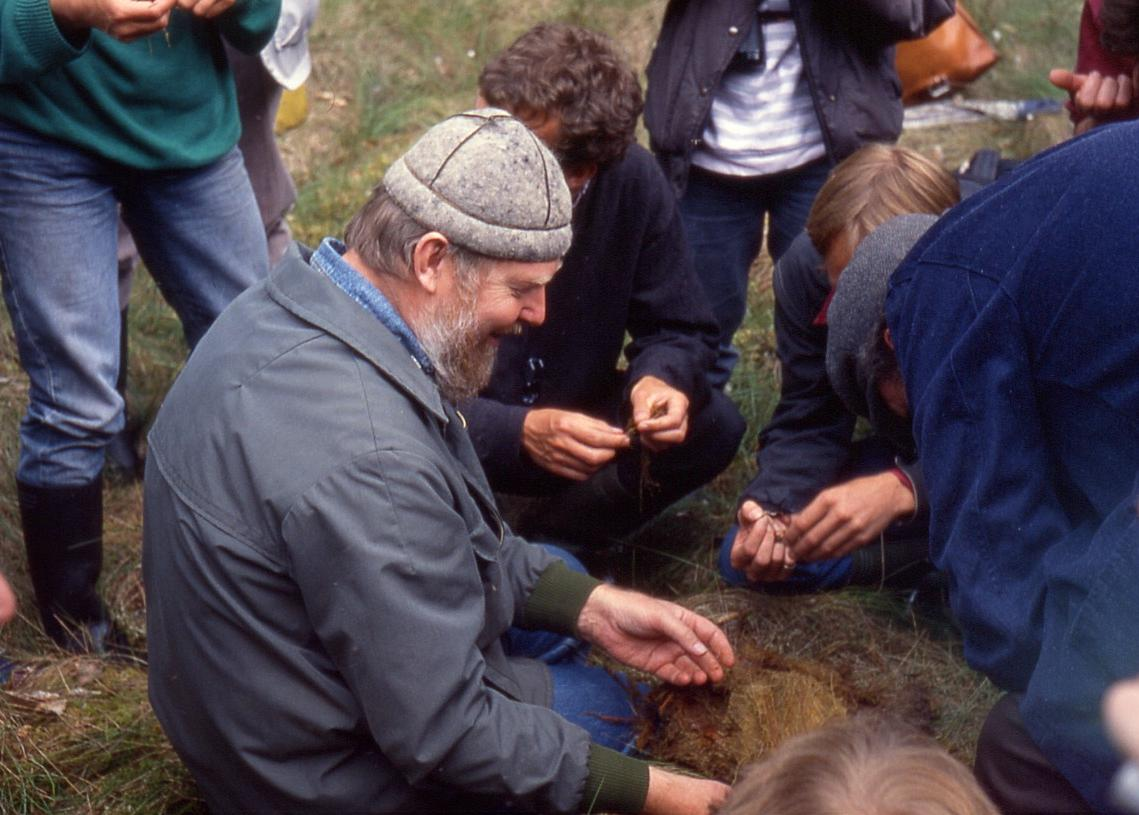
Michael Succow (born 1941), biologist and ecologist, 1997 Right Livelihood Award laureate

- Wilhelm Blaschke
- Karl Fredenhagen, physical-chemist (1923-1945)
- Felix Hausdorff, mathematician
- Hermann Landois, zoologist
- Jakob Meisenheimer, Chemie (1918–1923)
- Gustav Mie, physicist
- Johann Radon
- Michael Succow, Right Livelihood Award laureate

=== Medicine ===
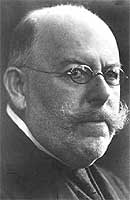
Friedrich Loeffler (1852–1915), noted bacteriologist

- Heinrich Adolf von Bardeleben
- Horst Bibergeil
- Christian Calenus
- Carl Hueter, surgeon
- Gerhardt Katsch
- Friedrich Loeffler, bacteriologist
- Ludwig Mecklinger
- Gerhard Mohnike
- Hugo Karl Anton Pernice
- Ferdinand Sauerbruch, surgeon
- Carl Ludwig Schleich, doctor and writer
- Werner Hosemann

=== Theology ===
- Albrecht Alt
- Hermann Cremer
- Gustaf Dalman
- Helmut Echternach
- Joachim Jeremias
- Martin Noth
- Victor Schultze

== Students ==
See also Category:University of Greifswald alumni

=== Arts and humanities ===
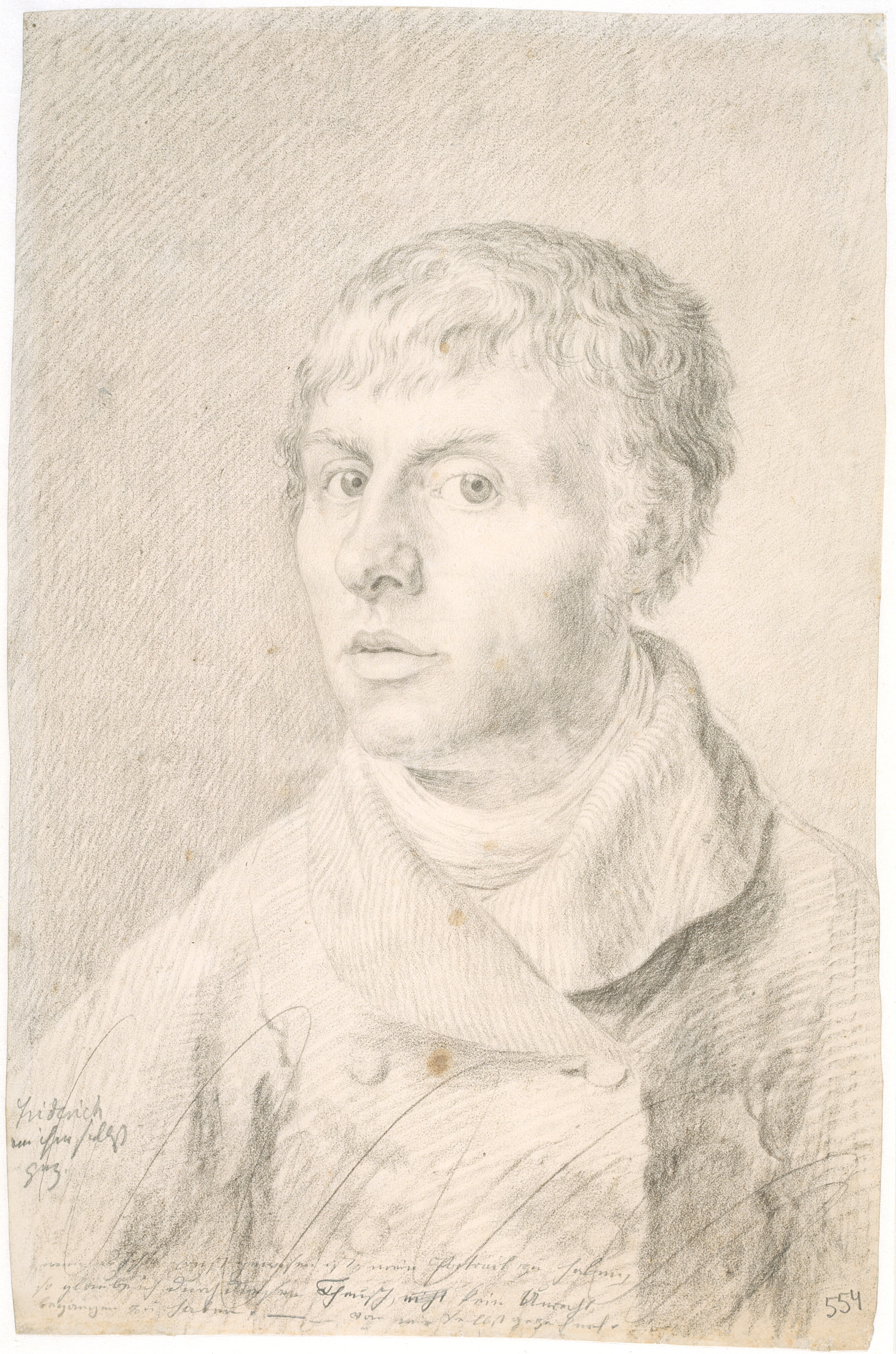
An early self-portrait of Caspar David Friedrich (1774–1840), who was born in Greifswald

- Bruno Benthien
- Hans Bentzien
- Hans Bunge
- Hans Jürgen Eggers, pre-historian
- Caspar David Friedrich, romanticist painter
- Oskar Manigk, Bildende Kunst
- Leo Wohleb, Klassische Philologie
- Thorsten Zwinger, Bildende Kunst

=== Business and law ===
- Georg Beseler
- Joachim von Bonin
- Walter Serner, dadaist and writer

=== Mathematics and sciences ===
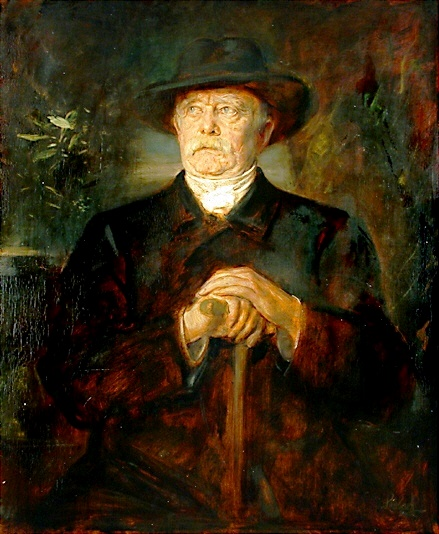
Otto von Bismarck (1815–1898), chancellor of the German Empire from 1871 to 1890

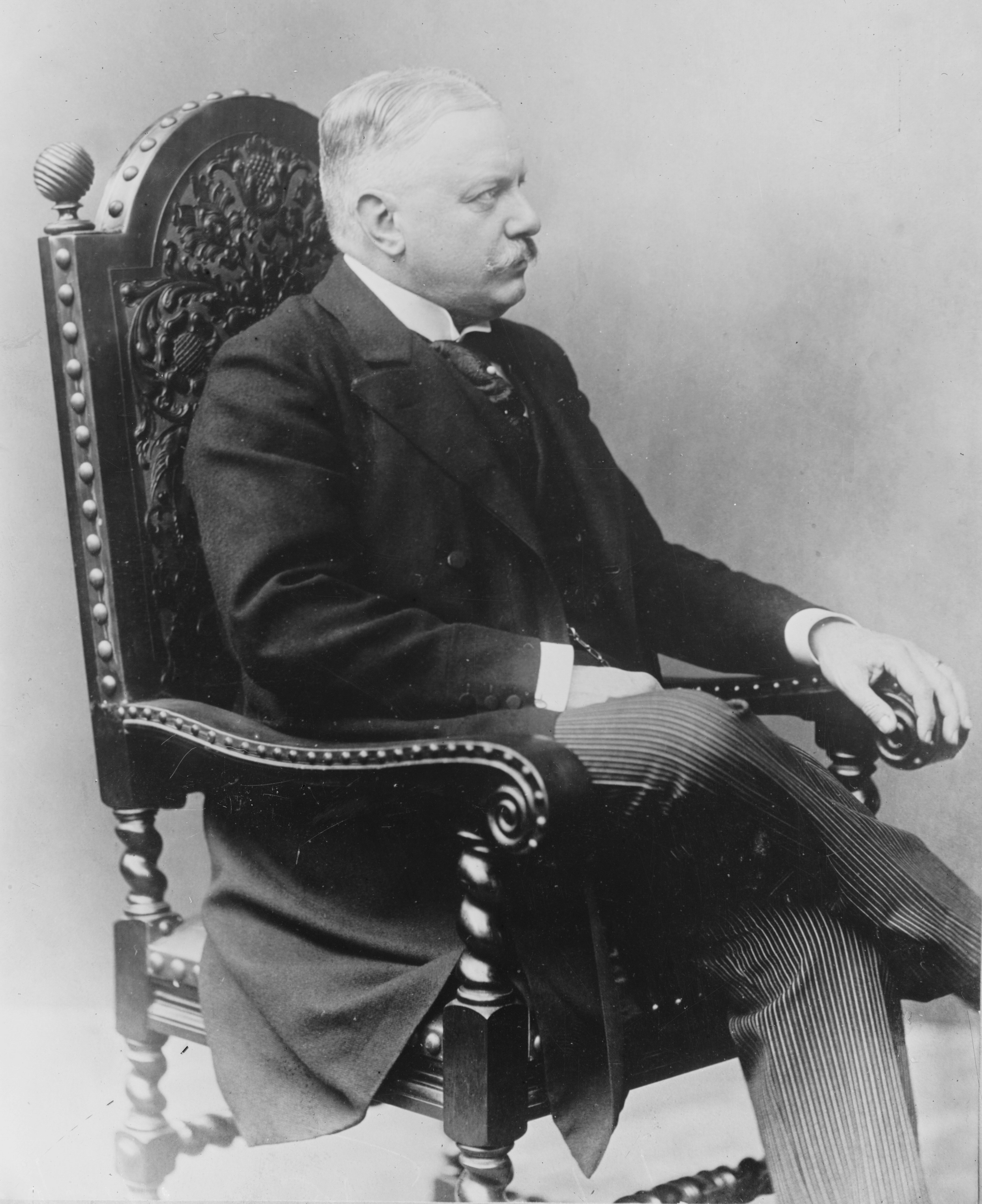
Prince Bernhard von Bülow (1849–1929), chancellor of the German Empire from 1900 to 1909

- Alexander Koenig
- Käthe Voderberg

=== Medicine ===
- Marianne Bielschowsky, biochemist
- Theodor Billroth, surgeon
- Thomas Kietzmann, physician and professor of biochemistry and molecular medicine, University of Oulu
- Widukind Lenz, pediatrician, medical geneticist and dysmorphologist
- Otto Gottlieb Mohnike
- Aleksander Majkowski
- Julius Moses, doctor and Member of the Reichstag (SPD)
- Gustav Nachtigal, explorer of Africa
- Ludwik Rydygier, Polish surgeon

=== Politics ===
- Otto von Bismarck, first chancellor of the German Empire
- Bernhard von Bülow, chancellor of the German Empire 1900–1909
- Gerhard Krüger, Nazi student leader
- Erich Mix, politician (NSDAP and FDP)
- Niklas Graßelt, politician (CDU)
- Graf Guido von Usedom, Prussia diplomate

=== Theology ===
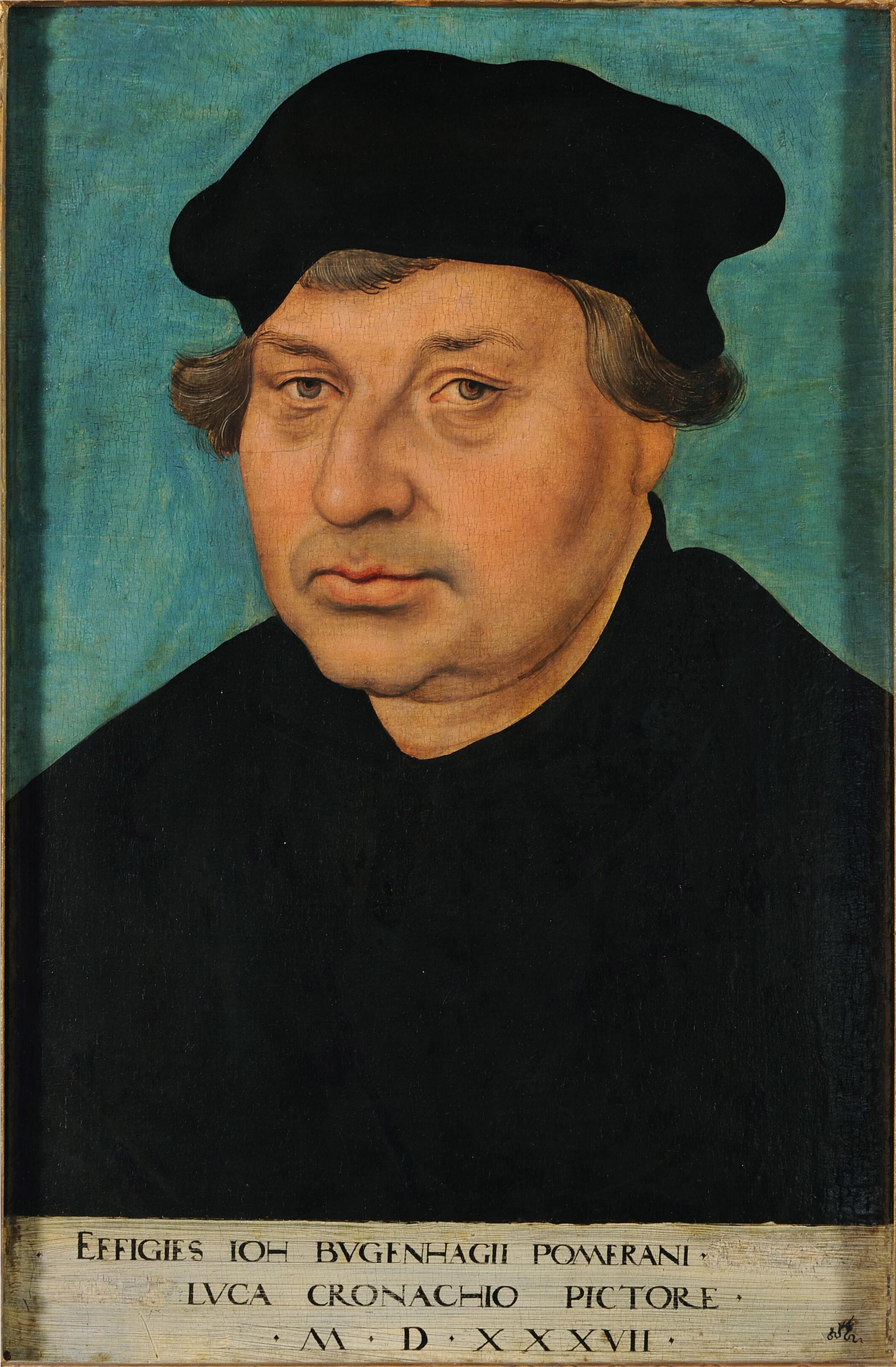
Johannes Bugenhagen (1485–1558), portrayed by Lucas Cranach the Elder

- Ernst Moritz Arndt, writer and politician
- Hermann Bonnus
- Johannes Bugenhagen, religious reformer
- Arnold Dannenmann
- Johann Friedrich Dieffenbach
- Friedrich Ludwig Jahn
- Gotthard Ludwig Kosegarten
- Gottlieb Mohnike, Theologe und Begründer der Skandinavistik
- Johannes Schmidt-Wodder
- Ernst Wilm

== Honorary doctorates ==
=== Arts and humanities ===
- Hildegard Emmel
- Wilhelm Friese
- Hans Ulrich Gumbrecht (2008), literary theorist at Stanford University
- Terho Itkonen, Fennist
- Wolfgang Koeppen, German writer
- Erik Lönnroth
- Günther Petersen, journalist
- Helmhold Schneider, entrepreneur
- Ehm Welk (1956), German writer
- Theodore Ziolkowski
- Matti Klinge, historian

=== Business and law ===
- Jacques Delors, former President of the European Commission
- Hans-Heinrich Jescheck

=== Medicine ===
- Hannelore Kohl, wife of Helmut Kohl

=== Theology ===
- Bartholomäus Battus
- Erich Gräßer
- Eberhard Jüngel
- Johannes Luther
- Gottlieb Mohnike (1824), Theologe und Begründer der Skandinavistik
- Roderich Schmidt
- Manfred Stolpe, Minister President of Brandenburg, Federal Minister of Germany

== Other ==
- Pope Callixtus III, approved of the founding of a university in Greifswald
- Hans Freyer, Soziologe und Philosoph
- Bengt Lidner, schwedischer Schriftsteller
- Albrecht Giese, Hansekaufmann
- Christiern Pedersen, dänischer Humanist und Schriftsteller
- Franz Seldte, NSDAP-Politiker
- Walter Serner, Essayist, Schriftsteller und Dadaist
