= Trebel (river) =

River in Germany

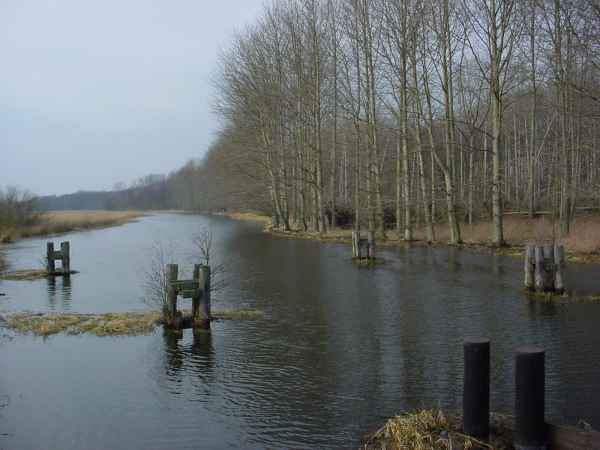

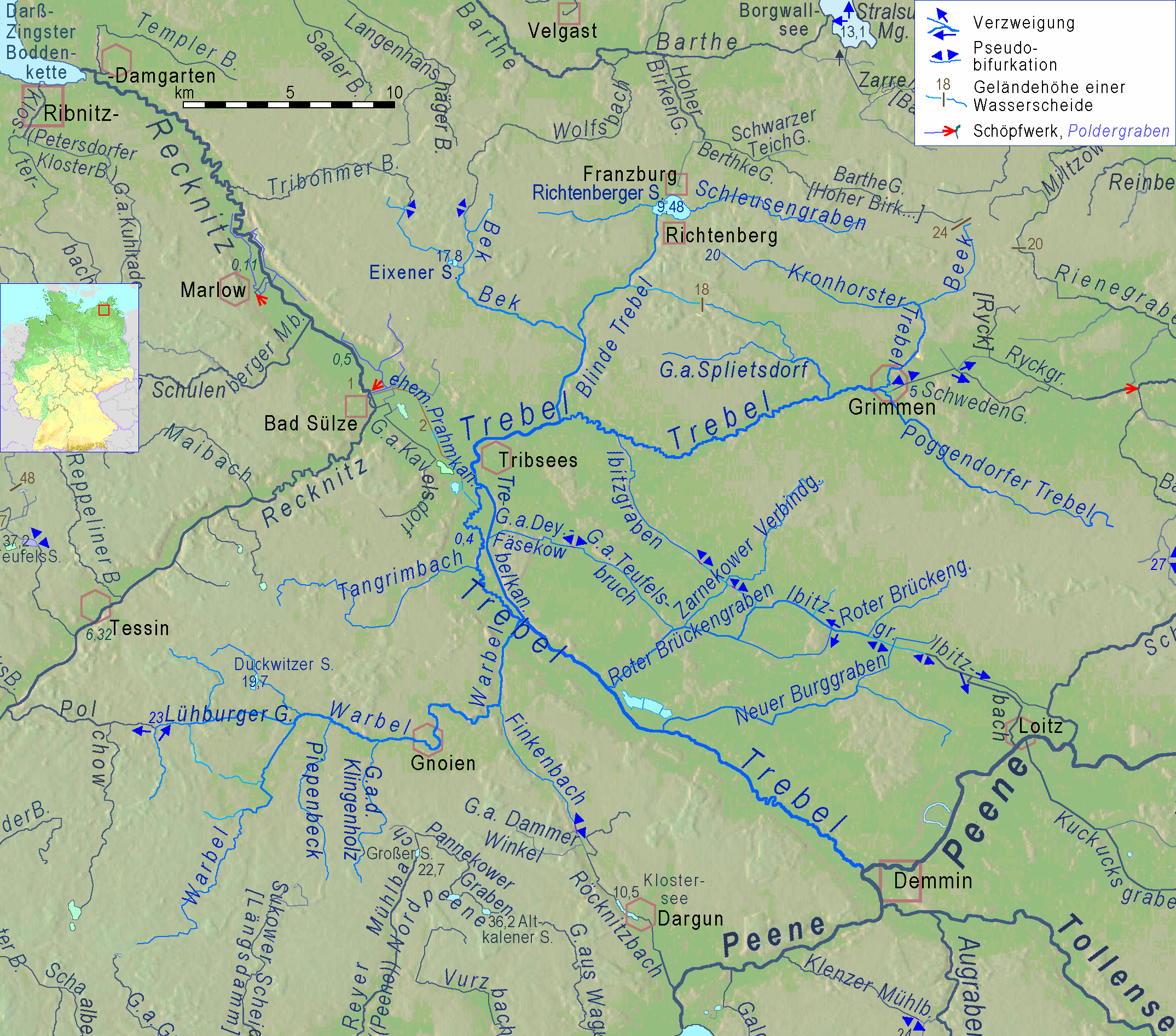
- Trebel river and its tributaries

Location
- Country: Germany
- State: Mecklenburg-Vorpommern

Physical characteristics
- Mouth
  - location: Peene
  - coordinates: 53.9145°N 13.0197°E

Basin features
- Progression: Peene→ Baltic Sea

The Trebel is a river in Western Pomerania, a region of Mecklenburg-Vorpommern, some 75 kilometers long. The Poggendorf Trebel (German: Poggendorfer Trebel; source Klein Zarnewanz) and Beek (source in Wittenhagen) are the sources of the river and merge in Grimmen. The Trebel then runs near Quitzin, merges with the Blinde Trebel near Franzburg, is connected to the Recknitz River by a ditch near Tribsees, merges with the Warbel River near Bassendorf (part of Deyelsdorf), then constitutes the historical border between Mecklenburg and Pomerania, and merges into the Peene River near Demmin. Ibitzgraben, Ibitzbach, and Roter Brückengraben are ditches connecting the Trebel and Peene rivers near their confluence.

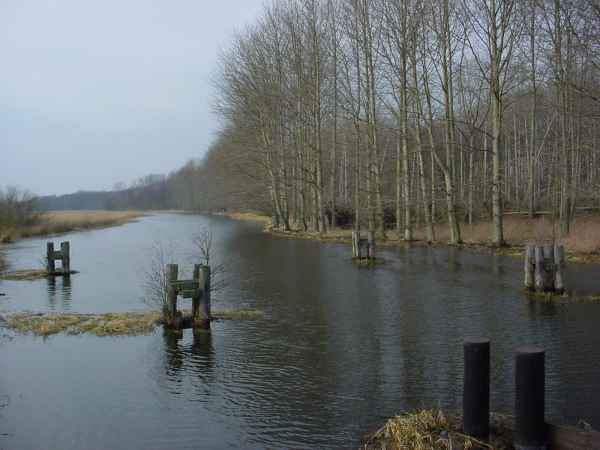
The Trebel near Nehringen

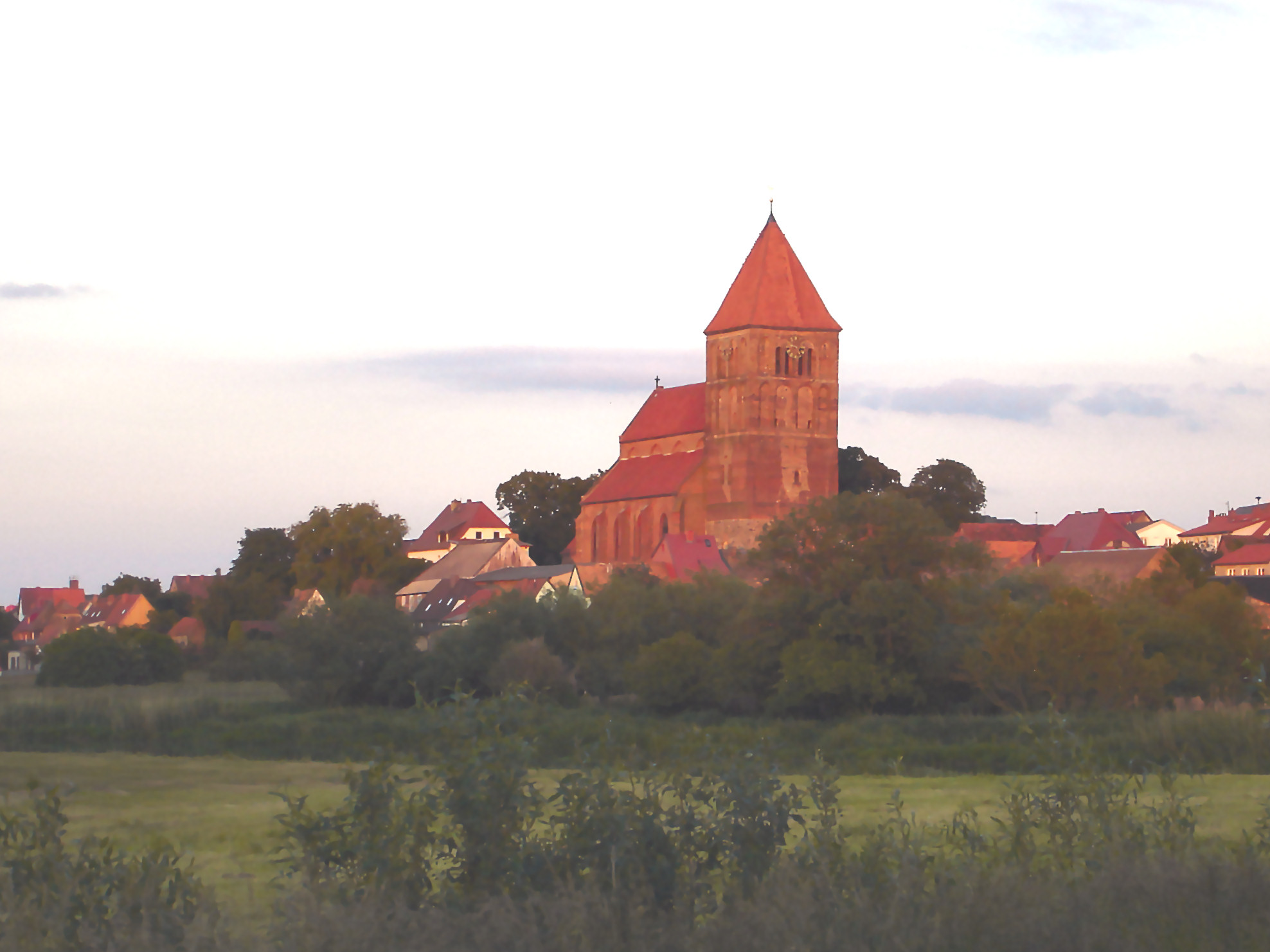
Tribsees
