= Zwinger (disambiguation) =

A Zwinger is part of a medieval castle or town fortification. It may also refer to:

== Fortifications and enclosures ==
- Zwinger (Goslar), a battery tower in the town fortifications of Goslar
- Zwinger (Münster), part of the town fortifications of Münster
- Zwinger (Dresden), a stately building and park area with museums in Dresden

== People with the surname ==
- Gustav Philipp Zwinger (1779–1819), German artist, etcher and lithographer
- Thorsten Zwinger (born 1962), German artist
- Theodor Zwinger (1533–1588), Swiss physician and Christian humanist scholar
