= Grimmen =

Town in Mecklenburg-Vorpommern, Germany

- Town
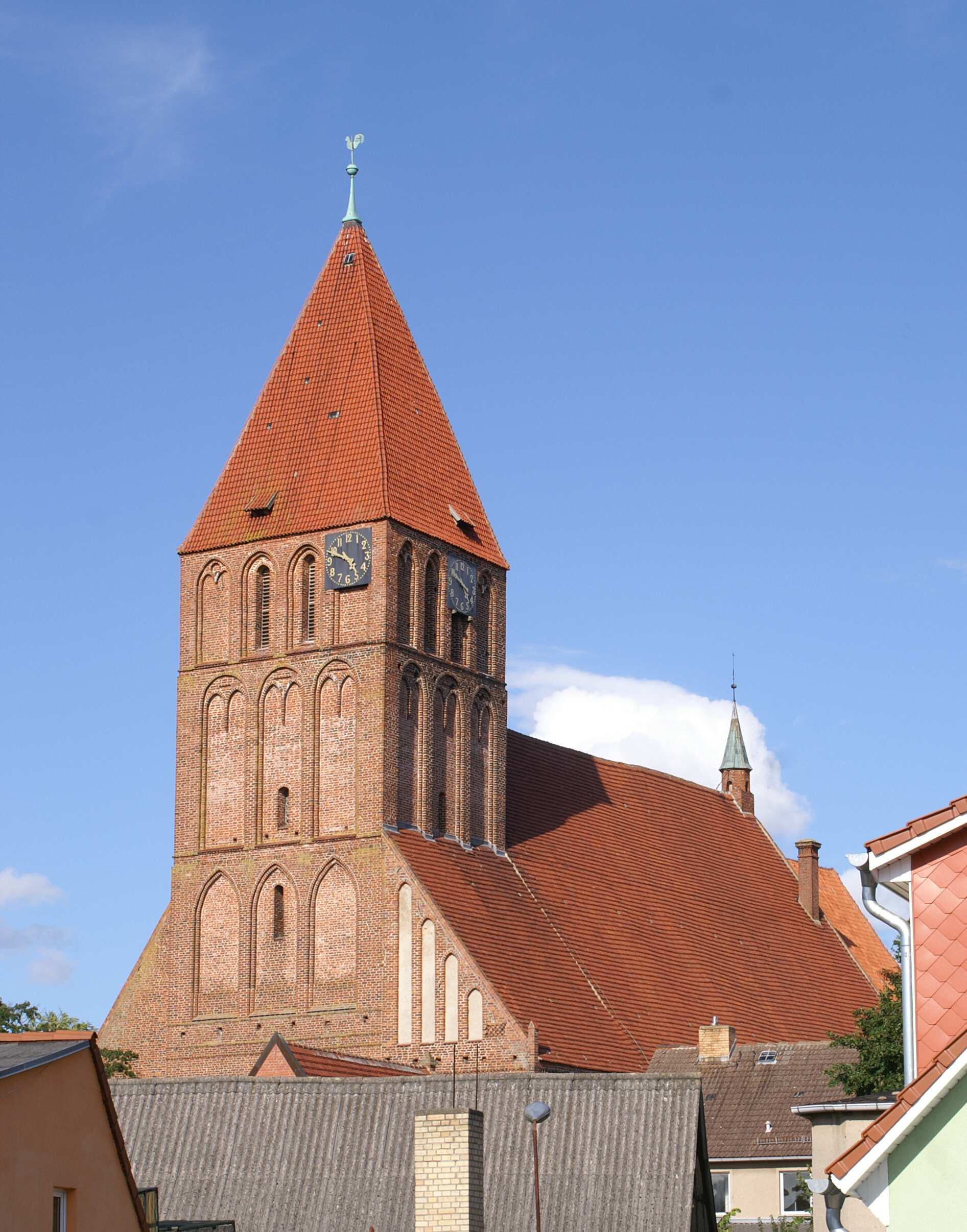
- Church of Saint Mary

- Coat of arms

- Location of Grimmen within Vorpommern-Rügen district
- Interactive map of Grimmen
- Location within Germany Location within Mecklenburg-Vorpommern
- Coordinates: 54°06′36″N 13°02′29″E
- Country: Germany
- State: Mecklenburg-Vorpommern
- District: Vorpommern-Rügen
- Subdivisions: 12 Ortsteile

Government
  - Mayor: Benno Rüster (CDU)

Area
  - Total: 50.51 km^{2} (19.50 sq mi)
- Elevation: 9 m (30 ft)

Population (2025-12-31)
  - Total: 9,274
  - Density: 183.6/km^{2} (475.5/sq mi)
- Time zone: UTC+01:00 (CET)
  - Summer (DST): UTC+02:00 (CEST)
- Postal codes: 18507
- Dialling codes: 038326
- Vehicle registration: GMN, NVP
- Website: www.grimmen.de

Grimmen (German pronunciation: [ˈɡʁɪmən]) is a town in Vorpommern-Rügen, a district in the Bundesland Mecklenburg-Vorpommern, Germany. Prior to 2011, when district reforms were made in Mecklenburg-Vorpommern, it was the capital of the now bygone Nordvorpommern district, which was abolished and merged to create the district of Vorpommern-Rügen.

== Geography ==
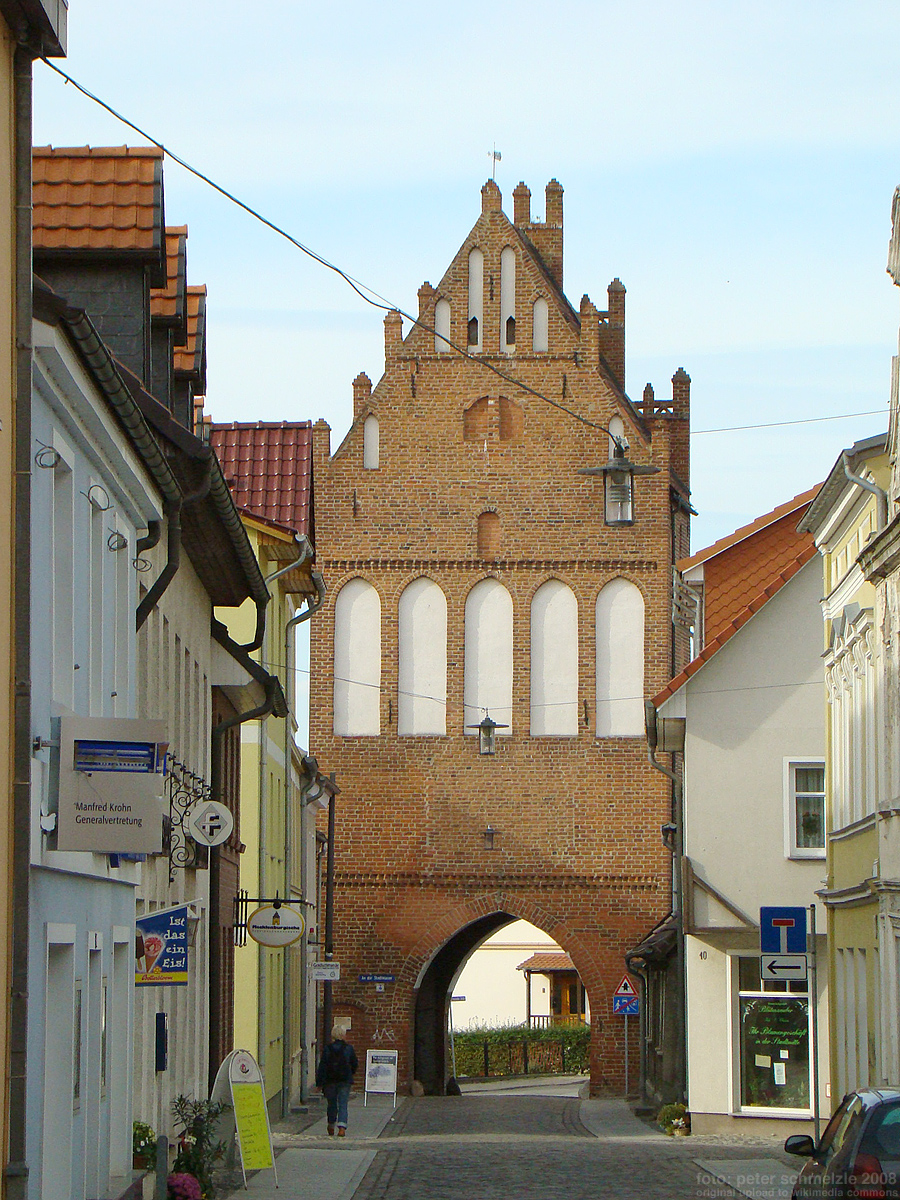
Stralsund gate

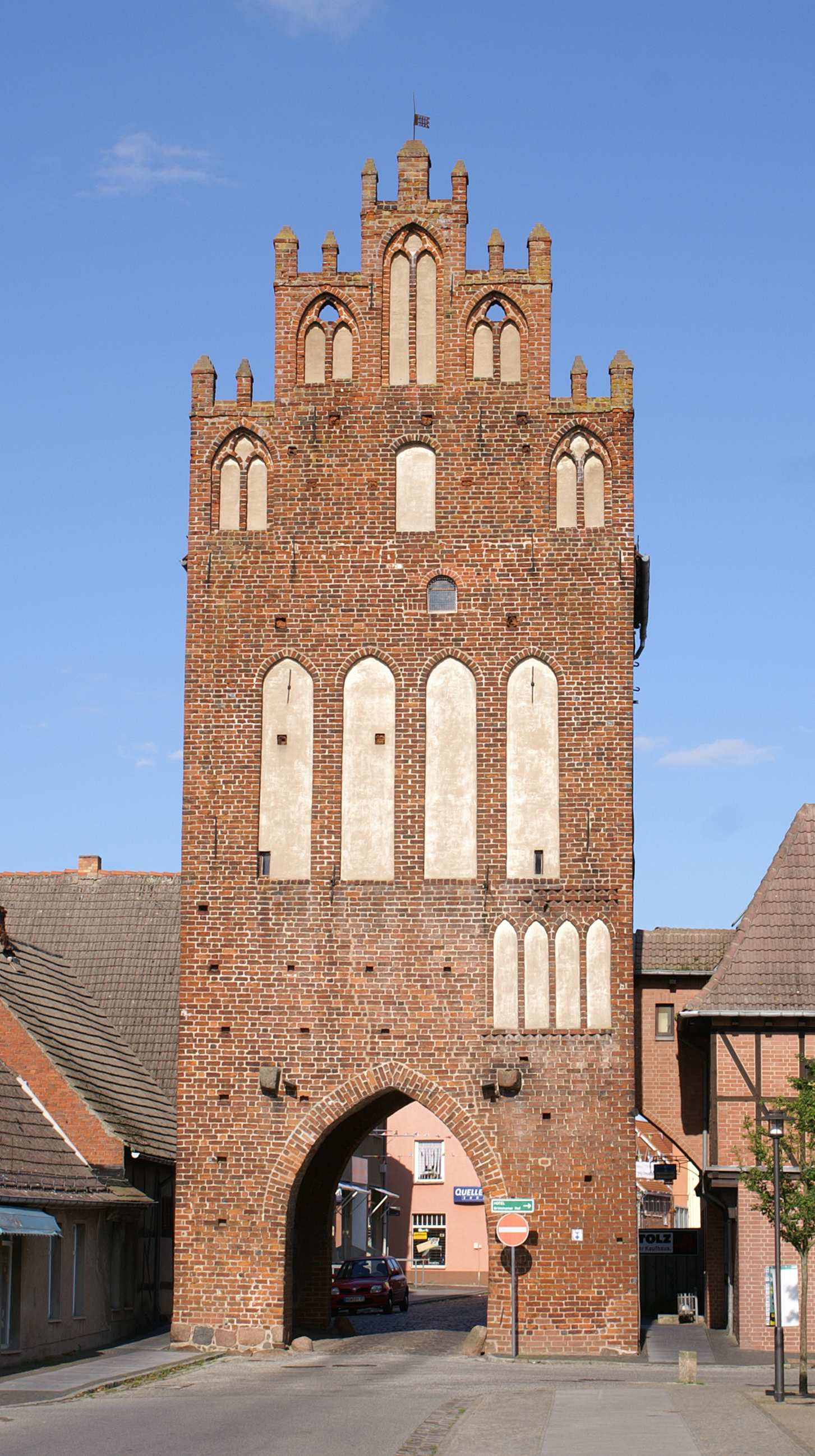
Mill's gate

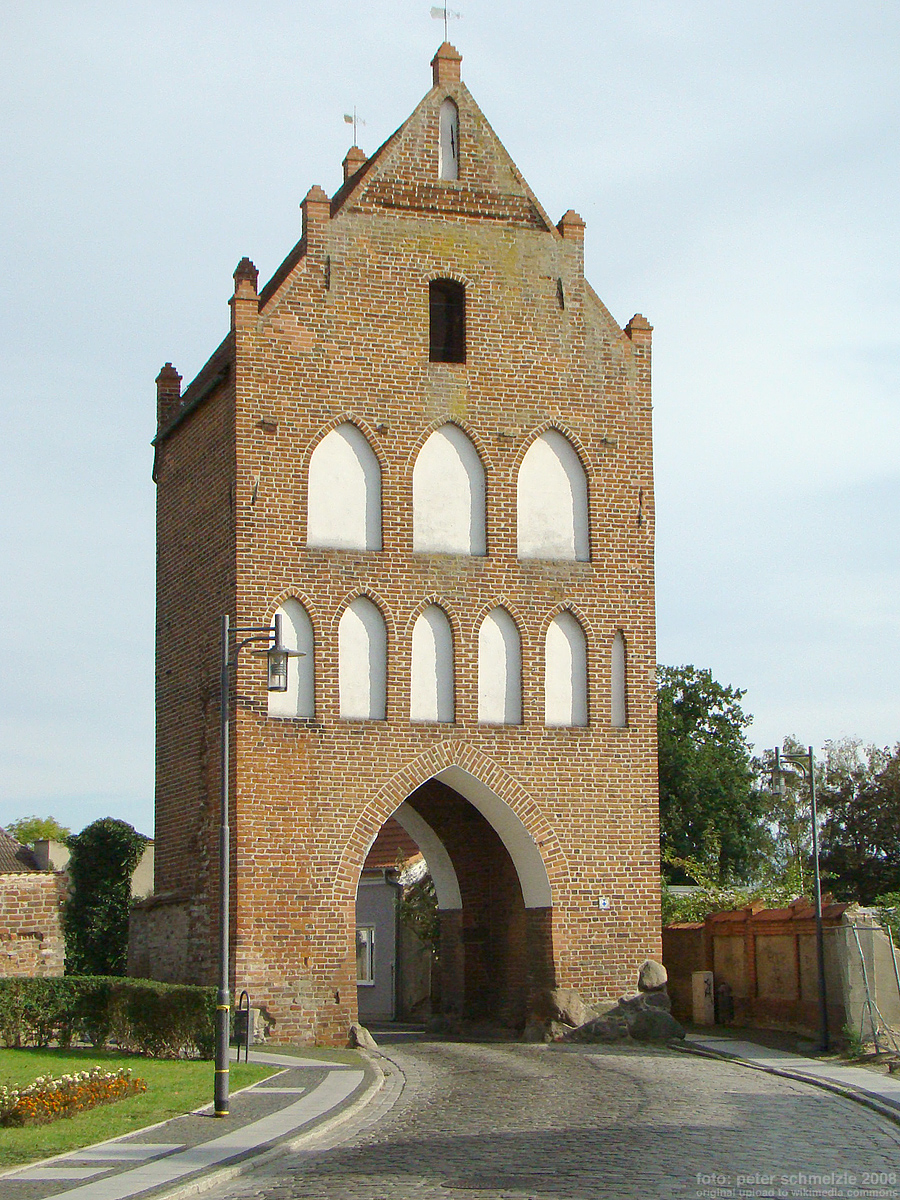
Greifswald gate

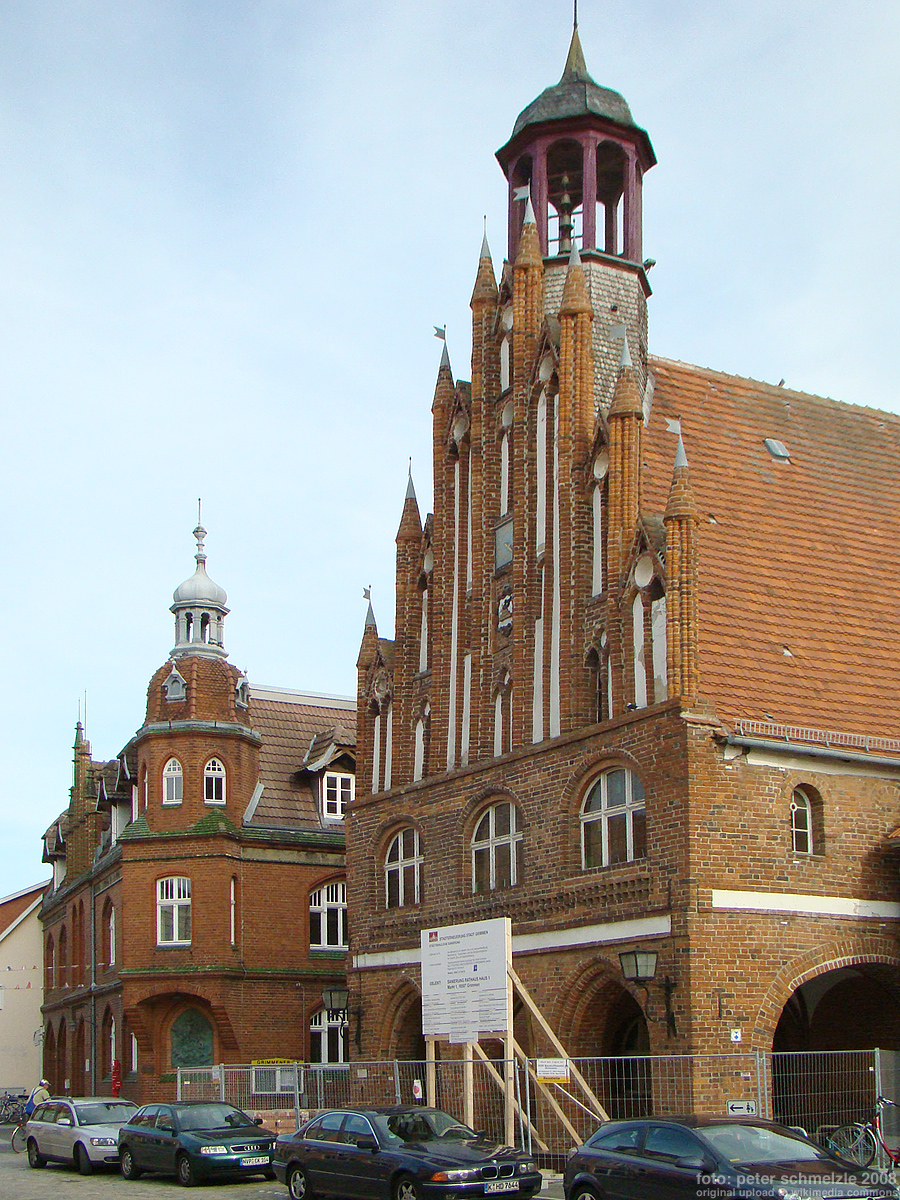
Town hall

Grimmen is located in southeastern Nordvorpommern on the banks of the river Trebel, about 30 km south of Stralsund and 30 km west of Greifswald. The town is connected to the Stralsund- Neustrelitz-Berlin railways, and to Autobahn A 20. Adjacent to the city limits are Amt Franzburg-Richtenberg in the West, Amt Miltzow in the North, and the Süderholz municipality in the Southeast.

=== Villages within Grimmen's city limits ===
In addition to the town of Grimmen, the following villages are also within Grimmen's city limits:

- Appelshof
- Gerlachsruh
- Grellenberg
- Groß Lehmhagen
- Heidebrink
- Hohenwarth
- Hohenwieden
- Jessin
- Klein Lehmhagen
- Stoltenhagen
- Vietlipp

=== Neighbouring municipalities ===
Neighbouring municipalities, listed clockwise beginning in the North, are Wittenhagen, Wilmshagen, Süderholz, Wendisch Baggendorf, Splietsdorf, Papenhagen.

== History ==
Grimmen was founded during the Ostsiedlung, when about 1250 merchants and craftsman from Lower Saxony, Westphalia and the Lower Rhine settled the site which then was part of the Principality of Rügen. The first document mentioning Grimmens is of 1267. In 1287, a report mentions Vogt Berthold taking office in the town, and further mentions that Grimmen had already been granted Lübeck law before. The actual charter is lost, thus the exact date when the town received Lübeck law remains uncertain. Accordingly, the 700th anniversary was celebrated in 1987. Since 1325, Grimmen belonged to the Duchy of Pomerania.

During the Thirty Years' War, the town was looted several times. After the war, Grimmen became part of Swedish Pomerania, a dominion of the Swedish Empire. From 1695 to 1697, mayor Johannes Flittner cruelly pursued alleged witches; at least seven were executed. In 1797, a large fire destroyed almost the entire town. In 1800, Swedish king Gustav IV Adolph visited Grimmen and resided in the so-called king's house. Following the Congress of Vienna in 1815, Swedish Pomerania with Grimmen became part of the Prussian Province of Pomerania. An administrative reform of 1816 made the town capital of a Kreis. In 1853, cholera broke out.

At the end Second World War, Grimmen surrendered to the Red Army without fighting in April 1945. In the 1960s, numerous new factories and agricultural enterprises were set up, resulting in prosperity and physical growth of the city. After East Germany's Communist regime collapsed following Die Wende movement of 1989, the town's old buildings were reconstructed. After a reorganization of the Kreis districts in 1994, Grimmen became capital of newly created Vorpommern-Rügen.

=== Demography ===
- 1600 – approx. 1,000 inhabitants
- 1712 – approx. 850 inhabitants
- 1809 – 1,840 inhabitants
- 1900 – 3,616 inhabitants
- 1946 – 8,298 inhabitants
- 1986 – approx. 15,000 inhabitants
- 1990 – of 14,242 inhabitants
- 1993 – 13,376 inhabitants
- 2003 – 10,892 inhabitants
- 2004 – 11,201 inhabitants

== Twin towns – sister cities ==
Grimmen is twinned with:

- Châteaulin, France
- Czaplinek, Poland
- Osterholz-Scharmbeck, Germany
- Staffanstorp, Sweden

== Sights ==
=== Buildings ===
The oldest building of the town is St. Mary's church, built in 1267. Of the old fortifications, three Brick Gothic gates are still intact:

- Mühlentor ("mill gate", built ~1320)
- Stralsunder Tor ("Stralsund gate", built ~1320)
- Greifswalder Tor ("Greifswald gate", built between 1350 and 1400).

Further sights are the city hall, built in Brick Gothic style around the year 1400, and the water tower, built in 1933.

=== Zoo ===
Grimmen's zoo holds more than 250 animals of 50 different kinds. The zoo opened in 1957 and also has a large variety in plants and green areas.

== Notable people ==
- Gottlieb Mohnike (1781–1841), pastor, philologist and translator
- Heike Götz (born 1964), journalist

== In fiction ==
The first chapters of Dennis Wheatley's WWII spy thriller "They used dark forces" are set in 1944 Grimmen, where Wheatley's British agent Gregory Sallust arrives on a secret mission in Nazi Germany.
