= Richtenberger See =

Lake in Germany

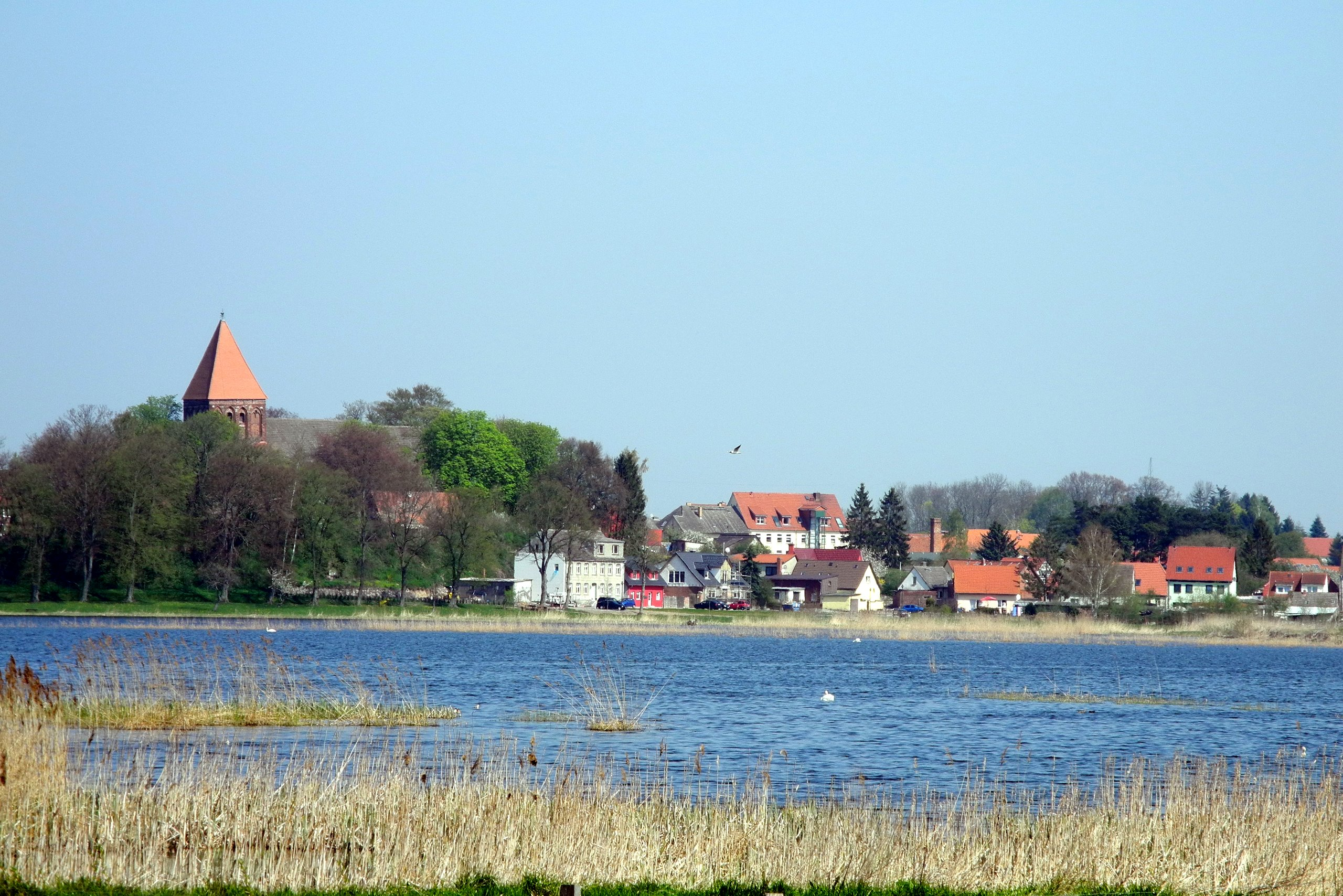
- The Richtenberger See in 2011 with a view of Richtenberg

- Location within Mecklenburg-Vorpommern
- Location: Mecklenburg-Vorpommern, Vorpommern-Rügen
- Coordinates: 54°11′39″N 12°52′59″E
- Primary inflows: Schleusengraben, other ditches
- Primary outflows: Blinde Trebel
- Max. length: 1.87 km (1.16 mi)
- Max. width: 1.02 km (0.63 mi)
- Surface area: 1.3 km^{2} (0.50 sq mi)
- Max. depth: 2.7 m (8.9 ft)
- Surface elevation: 10 m (33 ft)
- Islands: 2
- Settlements: Richtenberg, Franzburg

The Richtenberger See (also: Franzburg-Richtenberger See) is a lake between the towns of Franzburg and Richtenberg in Western Pomerania in northeast Germany. The waterbody was drained in 1936, but refilled as part of an ecological measure to compensate for environmental damage caused by the construction of the A 20 motorway.

== Geography ==
The lake has an area of about 130 hectares, a maximum length of about 1.8 kilometres from east to west and a maximum width of one kilometre from north to south. It has two islands. The water surface is about 10 metres above sea level. To the north lies Richtenberg and on the southern shore is Franzburg. The boundary between the two town boroughs runs through the lake. One of several inflows is the Schleusengraben ("sluice ditch") which enters from the east. On the southwestern shore of the lake is the Blinde Trebel channel which drains the lake. This channel is laid out as a fish ladder which climbs a height of 3.8 metres. In the southwest the lake is bordered by the Hellberge protected area.

There are footpaths, cycle paths and bridleways around the lake.

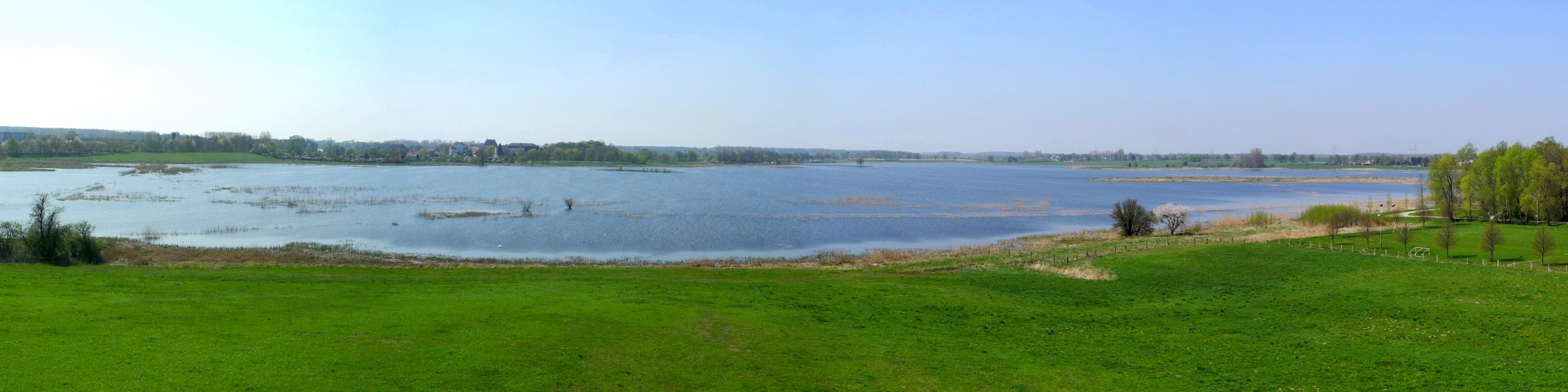
Panoramic view from the southeast shore of the lake.

== History ==
The lake was first mentioned in the 13th century, although it is not absolutely clear whether it had a natural origin or was laid out by monks from the nearby Neuenkamp Abbey in present-day Franzburg. The area was drained in 1936 by the Reichsarbeitsdienst. Before it was reflooded in 2006 there were wet meadows here that were crossed by drainage ditches that emptied into the Schleusengraben. The local district office of Franzburg-Richtenberg agreed tom implement an Agenda 21 plan for redesigning the landscape around the Franzburg-Richtenberger See.

A dispute has arisen between the towns of Franzburg and Richtenberg over the name of the lake. Richtenberg insists that the lake must be named after itself for historic reasons.

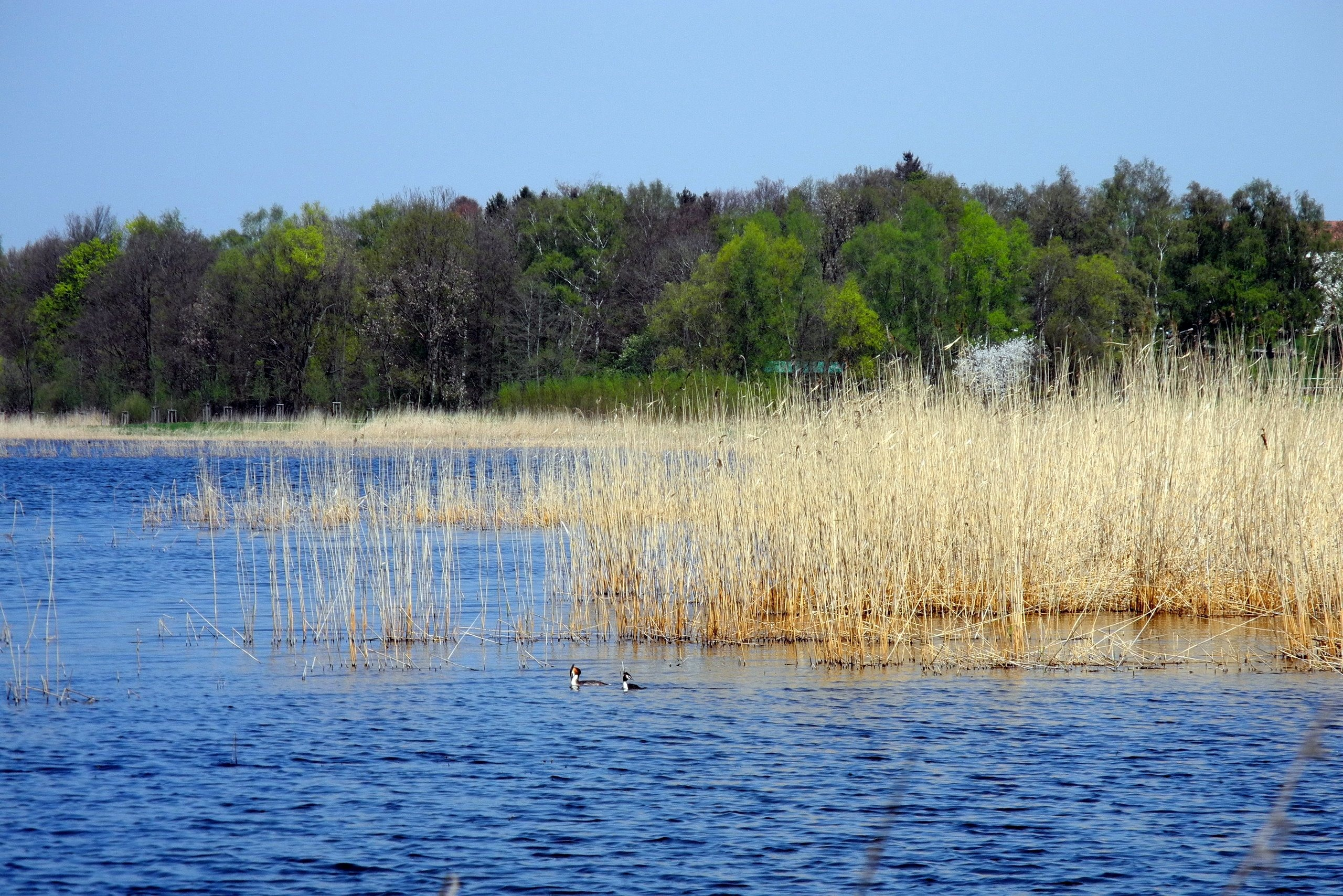
Recovered fauna and flora

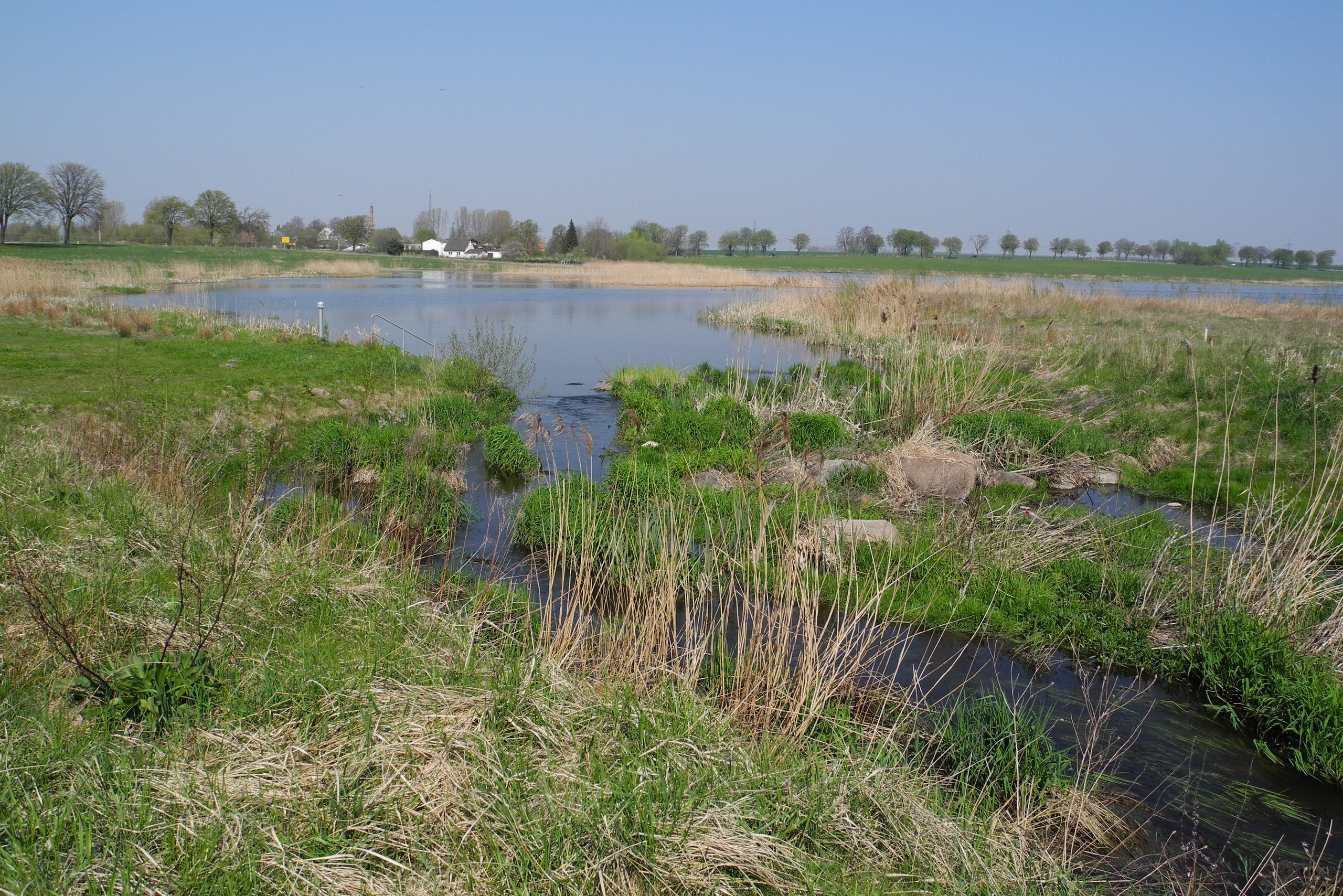
The outflow from the lake
