= Grimmen station =

Railway station in Germany

Grimmen
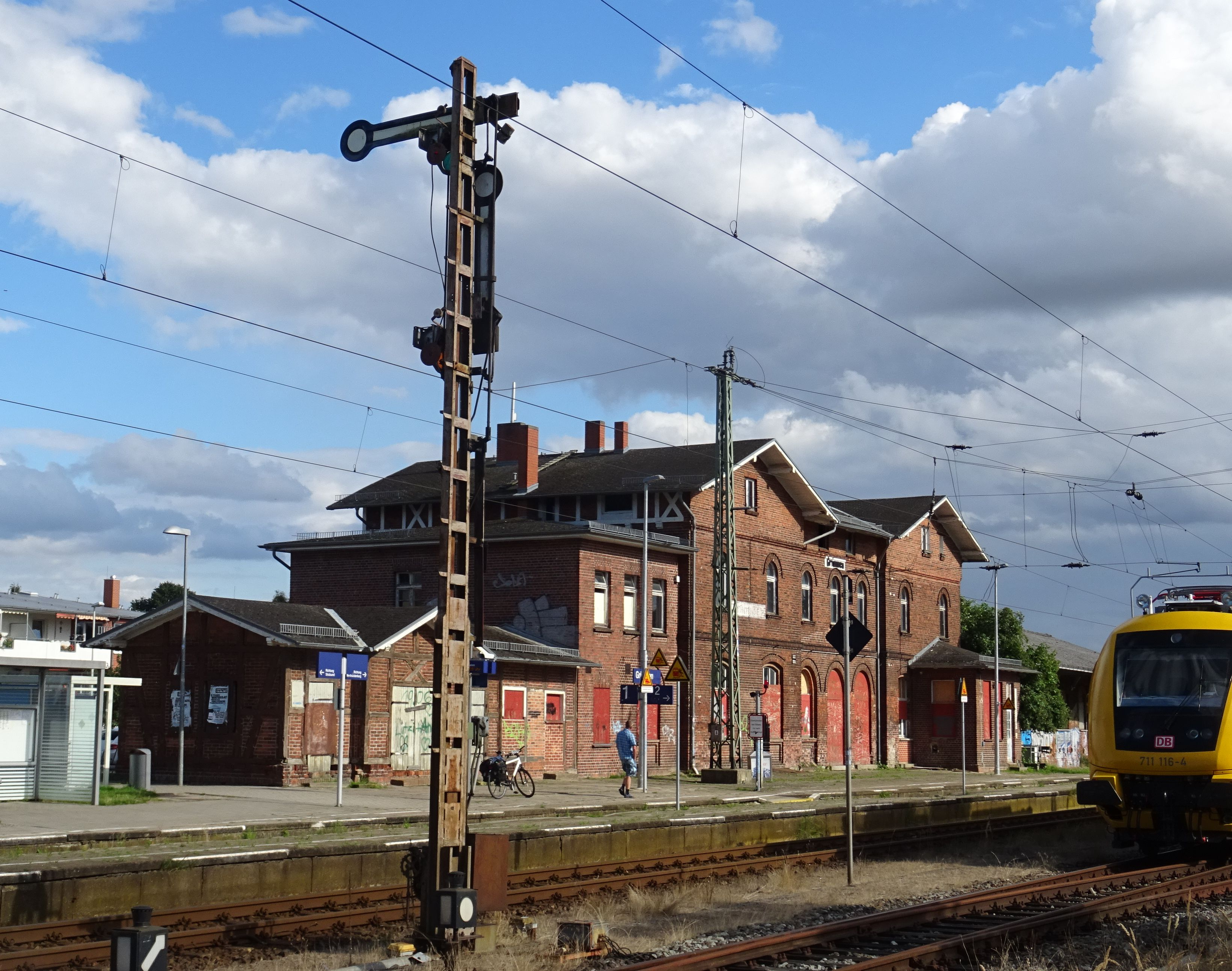
- 2017

General information
- Location: Bahnhofstraße; 18507 Grimmen; Mecklenburg-Vorpommern; Germany
- Coordinates: 54.1097°N 13.0343°E
- Owner: DB Netz
- Operator: DB Station&Service
- Lines: Berlin Northern Railway (KBS 205); Greifswald–Grimmen–Tribsees railway
- Platforms: 2 side platforms
- Tracks: 3
- Train operators: DB Regio Nordost

Other information
- Station code: 2277
- DS100 code: WGI
- IBNR: 8011707
- Category: 6
- Website: www.bahnhof.de

History
- Opened: 1 January 1878; 148 years ago
- Electrified: 29 May 1994; 32 years ago

Services
Preceding station	DB Regio Nordost	Following station
Wittenhagen towards Stralsund Hbf	RE 5	Rakow towards Berlin Südkreuz
Wittenhagen towards Stralsund Hbf	RE 51	Rakow towards Neustrelitz Hbf
Location
- Location within Mecklenburg-Vorpommern

Grimmen station is a railway station in the municipality of Grimmen, located in the Vorpommern-Rügen district in Mecklenburg-Vorpommern, Germany.
