= Warbel =

River in Germany

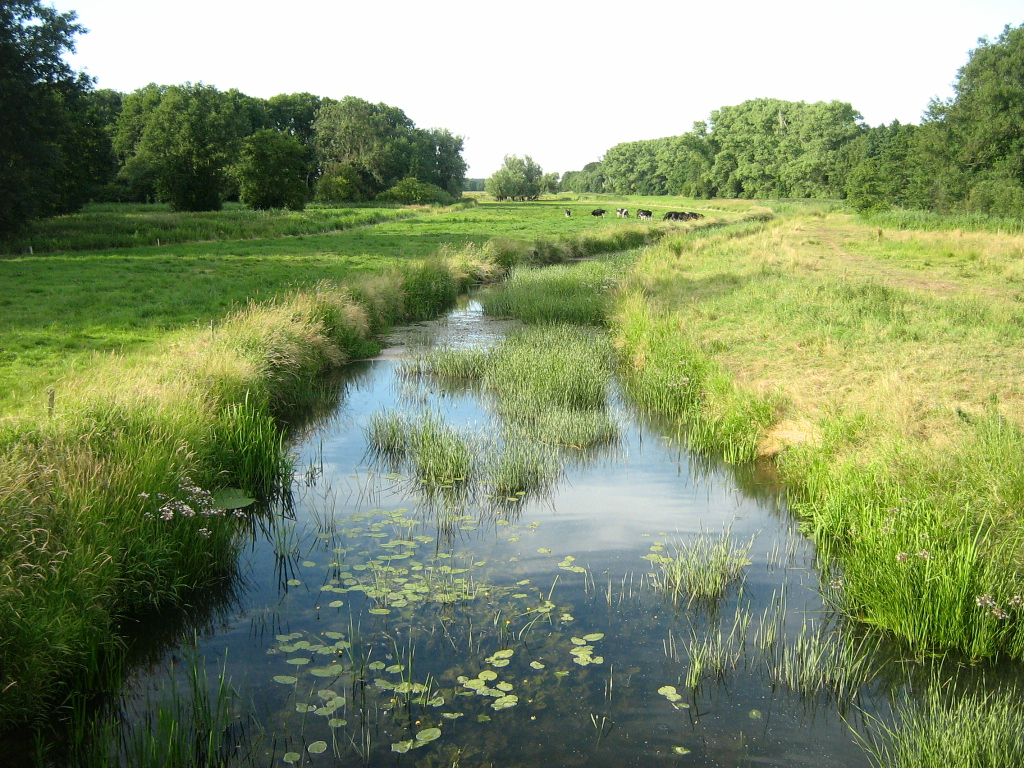

Location
- Country: Germany
- State: Mecklenburg-Vorpommern

Physical characteristics
- Mouth
  - location: Trebel
  - coordinates: 54.0197°N 12.7721°E

Basin features
- Progression: Trebel→ Peene→ Baltic Sea

Warbel is a river of Mecklenburg-Vorpommern, Germany. It flows into the Trebel near Bassendorf.

== See also ==
- List of rivers of Mecklenburg-Vorpommern
