= Eugen Zwinger =

Pastor and founder of Lutheran Church of the Epiphany

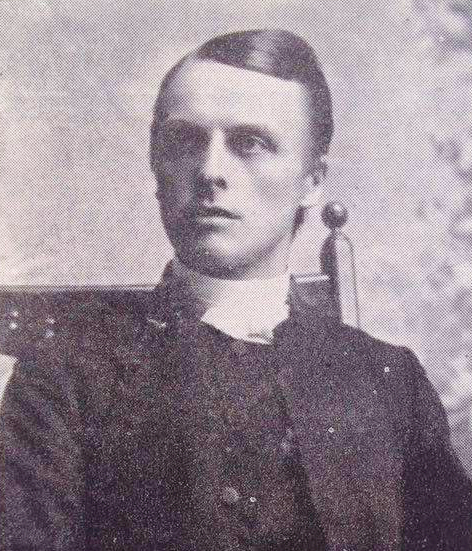
Eugen Zwinger (Pastor S. Swinger, 1891-1893)

Heinrich Louis Ewald Eugen Zwinger ("Pastor S. Swinger", born February 22, 1866, in Bernburg) was a pastor and founder of the Lutheran Church of the Epiphany in Hempstead, New York.

== Early life and family ==
He was born as the son of the perfumery trader Heinrich Louis Zwinger (born 1826) and his wife Auguste Kühne (born c. 1830). From 1883 to 1885 he visited the Protestant church seminars for the preparation of theological studies at the Friedrich Wilhelm University in Berlin and later in Kiel and Chicago (Missouri Synod). In 1889 the young Eugene Zwinger was sent on behalf of the German Protestant Church Synod to pastoral support and support of German emigrants to the east coast of North America, to Protestant communities in Ontario, Connecticut, Michigan, Chicago and others. In 1890 he married Katharina Magdalena Grosche (born 1868) and she gave birth to Theophil (1891) and Johannes "Charly" (1893).

== Foundation of the Church of the Epiphany and later work ==
In 1898, Pastor Eugen Zwinger became the co-founder of the Church of the Epiphany in Hempstead / Nassau, New York. He was responsible for the church community until 1900. Between the middle of the 1890s and the early 1900s, the controversies between him and the conservative German-American church escalated in such a way that The New York Times published several articles about him. In 1900 Eugen Zwinger went to Bridgewater Township, Michigan; he lived and worked there at St. Johns Lutheran Church. In 1903 Eugen Zwinger left the USA and went back to Germany together with his wife and two sons. In 1904 he travelled on behalf of the German Protestant Church with the same mission as in North America now to Brazil. He lived and worked there for several years as a pastor and teacher in the Christian-Protestant "Colonia Santa Cruz do Sul-Rio Grande do Sul", which was founded in 1849. In 1938 the pastor Eugen Zwinger died at the age of 72.
