= University of Greifswald Faculty of Law and Economics =

Faculty of Law and Economics
- Rechts- und Staatswissenschaftliche Fakultät
- Type: Faculty (business and law school)
- Established: 1456
- Affiliations: University of Greifswald
- Location: Greifswald, Mecklenburg-Vorpommern, Germany; 54°5′48.48″N 13°23′12.69″E
- Website: www.rsf.uni-greifswald.de

The University of Greifswald Faculty of Law and Economics (German: Rechts- und Staatswissenschaftliche Fakultät der Ernst-Moritz-Arndt-Universität Greifswald) is one of five faculties of the university that is situated in Greifswald, Germany. Its roots go back to the founding of the university in the year 1456.

== Business Administration ==
In various rankings, the management programmes at the University of Greifswald get nationwide top places in Germany.

Business management degrees offered include the traditional German 4-year diploma as well as B.A., and M.A.

== Law ==
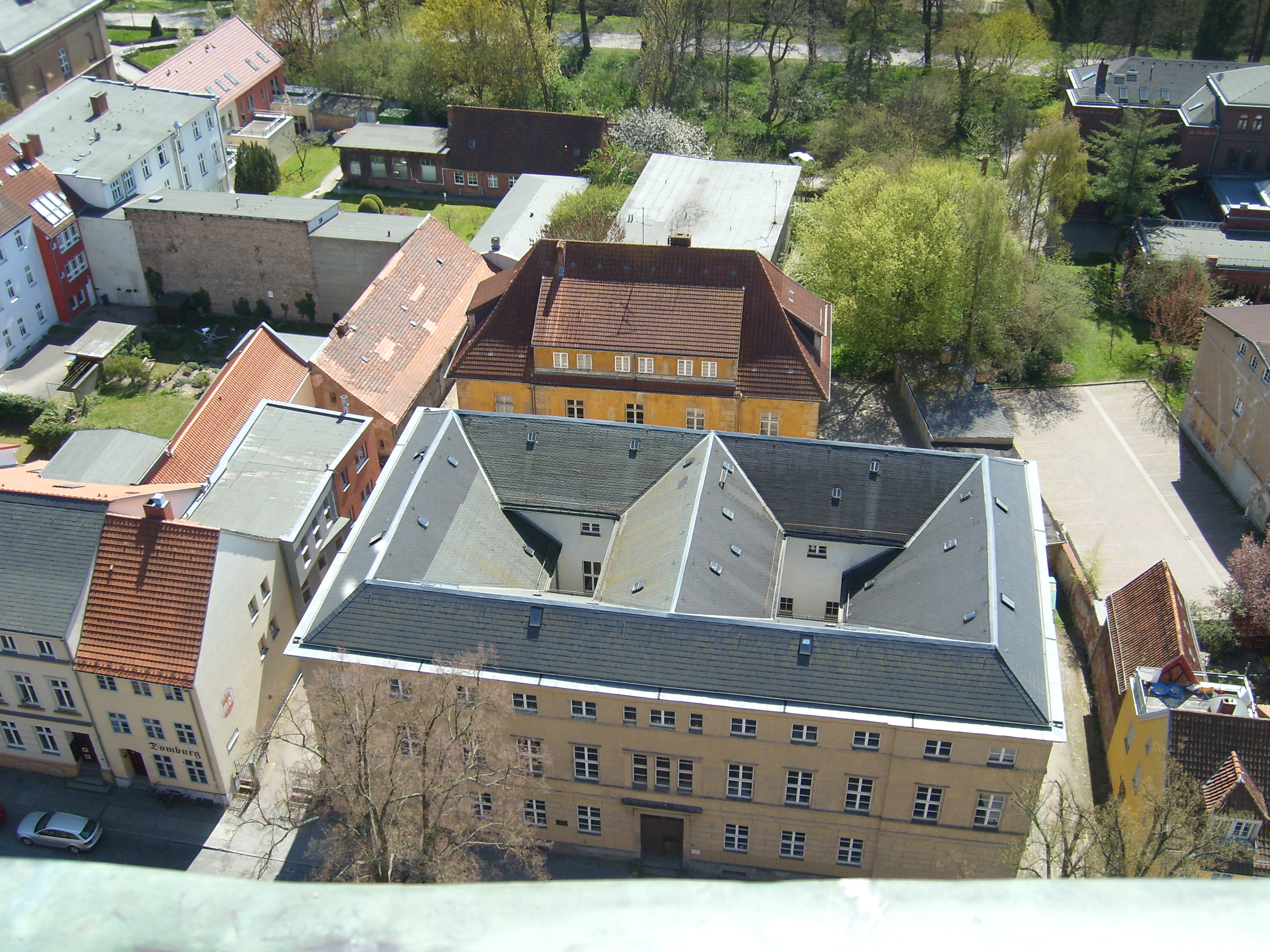
Law Dept seen from Saint Nicolas Cathedral's tower.

As a consequence of education reforms, jurisprudence will, in the future, be concentrated at the University of Greifswald and the Faculty of Law at the University of Rostock will be closed.

At the Faculty of Law and Economics, courses are offered in jurisprudence leading to the German State Examination as well as LL.B. and LL.M. degrees.

== Associated people ==
Former staff members include Rudolf Agricola, Carl Schmitt, Friedrich Spielhagen, and Bernhard Windscheid. Alumni are for instance Georg Beseler, Bernhard von Bülow, Erich Mix, and Walter Serner.
