= Gottlieb Mohnike =

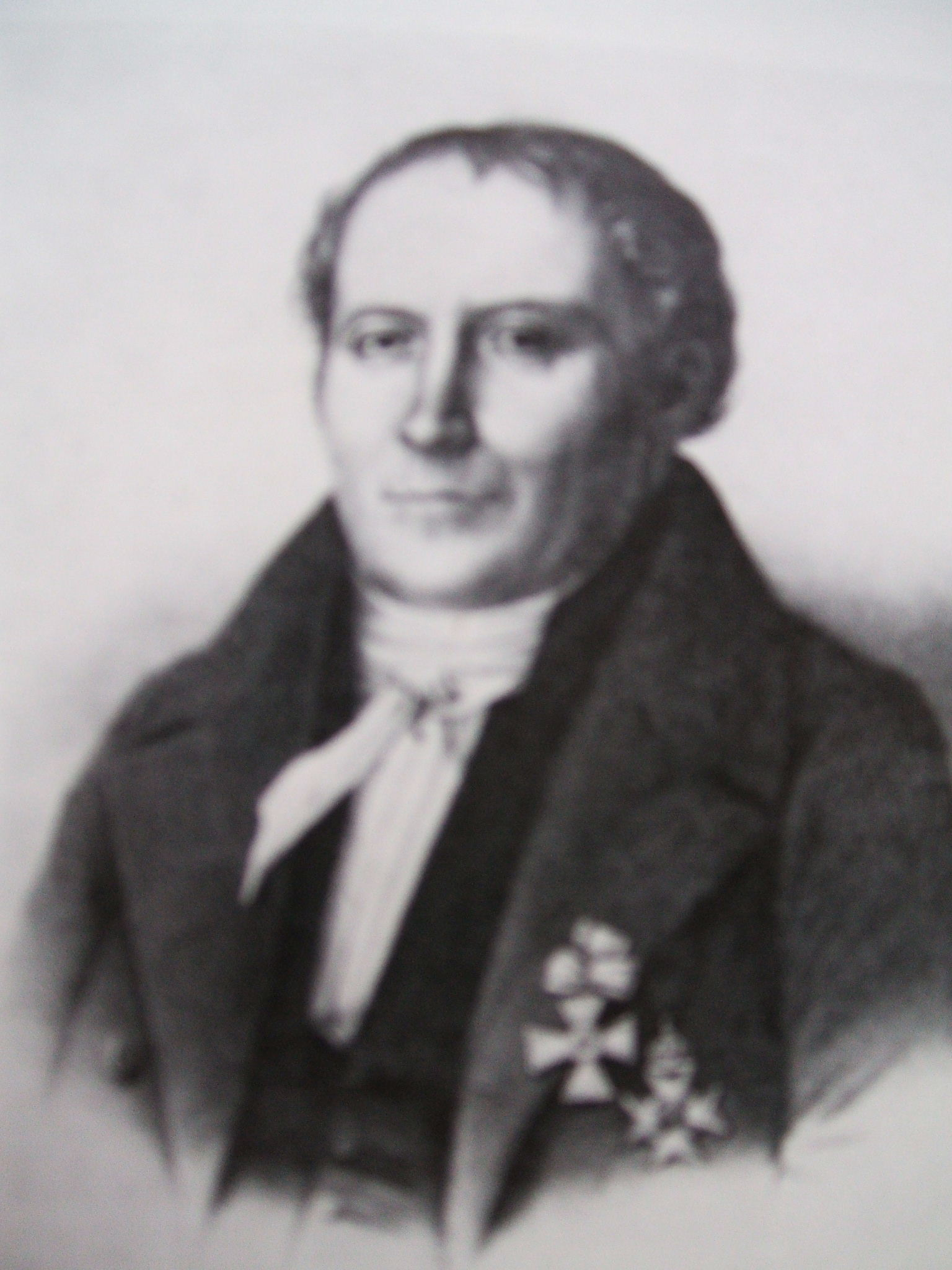
Gottlieb Christian Mohnike

Gottlieb Christian Friedrich Mohnike (6 January 1781 – 6 July 1841) was a German pastor and philologist who was a native of Grimmen. He was the father of physician Otto Gottlieb Mohnike (1814–1887).

He studied theology at the Universities of Greifswald and Jena, afterwards spending several years as a private instructor on the island of Rügen. In 1813 he became pastor at St. Jakobi Church in Stralsund, and in 1824 was awarded an honorary doctorate of theology from the University of Greifswald.

Mohnike was a founder of Nordic philology, being remembered for his translation and edition of the Heimskringla and Færeyinga saga. He published several translated works by the Swedish poet Esaias Tegnér (1782–1846), that included Die Frithjofs Sage. Also, he conducted extensive studies of Greek and Roman literature, hymnology and the history of Pomerania.

Throughout his career he maintained friendships and correspondence with writer Ernst Moritz Arndt (1769–1860) and philosopher Gotthilf Heinrich von Schubert (1780–1860).
