= Richtenberg =

- Town
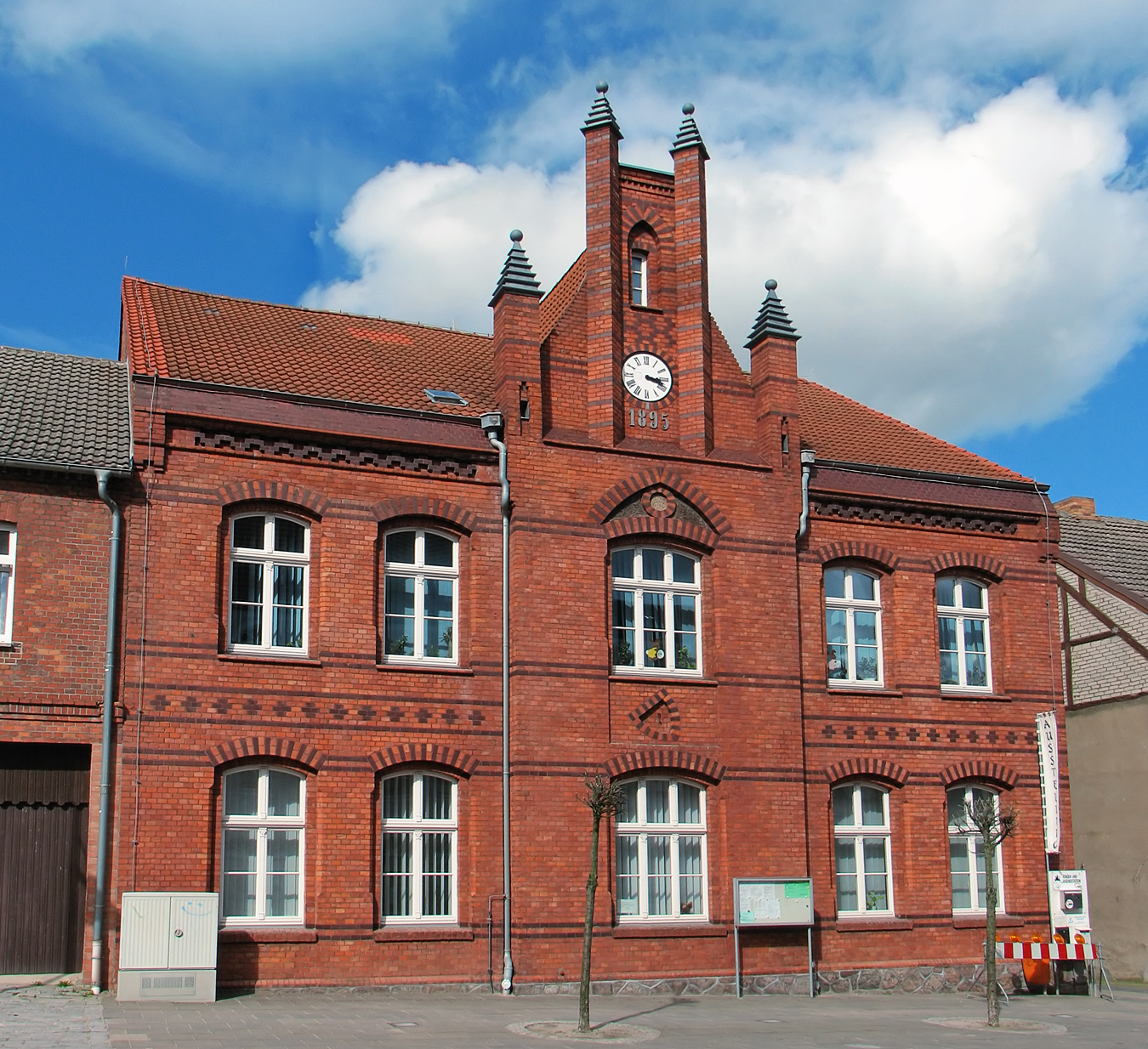
- Town hall

- Coat of arms

- Location of Richtenberg within Vorpommern-Rügen district
- Interactive map of Richtenberg
- Location within Germany Location within Mecklenburg-Vorpommern
- Coordinates: 54°12′N 12°52′E
- Country: Germany
- State: Mecklenburg-Vorpommern
- District: Vorpommern-Rügen
- Municipal assoc.: Franzburg-Richtenberg

Government
  - Mayor: Karldiether Wegner

Area
  - Total: 15.68 km^{2} (6.05 sq mi)
- Elevation: 19 m (62 ft)

Population (2025-12-31)
  - Total: 1,294
  - Density: 82.53/km^{2} (213.7/sq mi)
- Time zone: UTC+01:00 (CET)
  - Summer (DST): UTC+02:00 (CEST)
- Postal codes: 18461
- Dialling codes: 038322
- Vehicle registration: NVP
- Website: www.amt-franzburg-richtenberg.de

Richtenberg (German: [ˈʁɪçtn̩ˌbɛʁk]) is a municipality in the Vorpommern-Rügen district, in Mecklenburg-Western Pomerania, Germany. It is 18 km (11 mi) southwest of Stralsund.

Richtenberg was first mentioned in the founding document of the Neuenkamp monastery (today Franzburg) dated 8 November 1231. It is the oldest documented place in the region. In the foundation deed of the ruling Prince Wizlaw I, the monastery was awarded a patronage over the Richtenberg church as well as a local salt source.
