= Otto Gottlieb Mohnike =

German botanist (1814–1887)

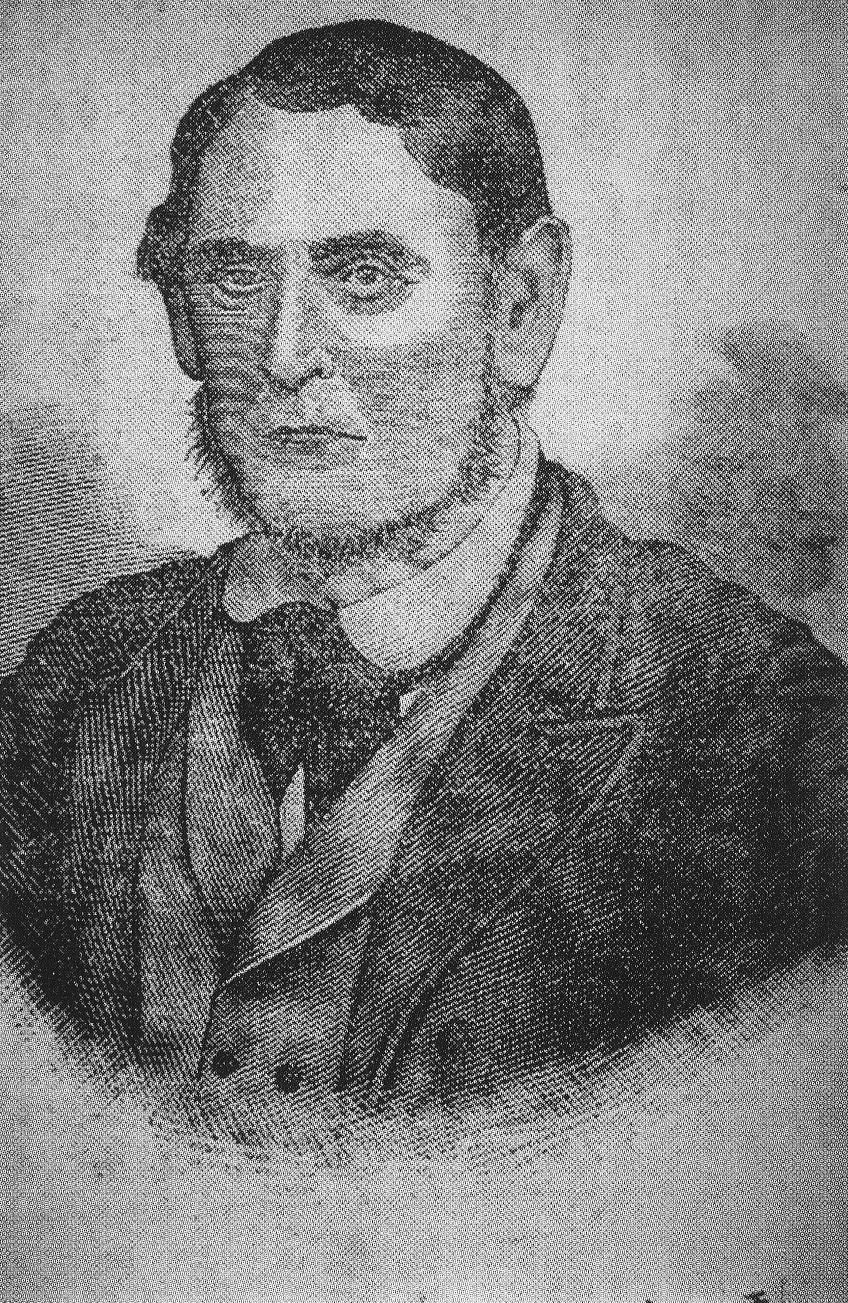

Otto Gottlieb Mohnike (27 July 1814 – 26 January 1887) was a German medical doctor and naturalist who was a native of Stralsund. He was the son of philologist Gottlieb Mohnike (1781–1841).

He received his education in medicine at the Universities of Greifswald and Bonn, and following his studies, returned to Stralsund to practice medicine. From 1844 to 1869 he was a doctor in the services of the Dutch military, afterwards working as a physician in Bonn, where he died on 26 January 1887.

Mohnike is remembered for implementing the first successful nationwide smallpox vaccination in Japan. Previous attempts at vaccination in Japan had failed due to vaccines losing their effectiveness while being transported on long sea journeys. In 1849 he instituted the practice of delivering fresh cowpox vaccine from Batavia in the Dutch East Indies to the Japanese port of Nagasaki, thus creating a sharp reduction of smallpox in Japan. Afterwards, he conducted research as a naturalist on Java, Sumatra, Celebes and the Moluccas.

== Publications ==
- Die Cetoniden der Philippinischen Inseln, 1873.
- Banka und Palembang nebst Mittheilungen über Sumatra im Allgemeinen, 1874.
