= Thorsten Zwinger =

German painter

Thorsten Zwinger (artist pseudonym ZWINGER, born March 23, 1962, in Greifswald) is a German painter.

== Work ==
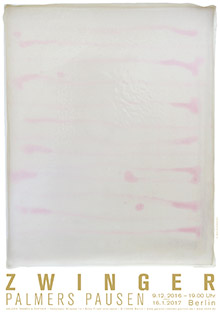
Exhibition "Palmers Pausen", 2016

Thorsten Zwinger works on the assumptions of an image survey, which pursues three media basics: 1. As a painter, he operates in a structurally designed character system, which is intended to switch off historically loaded attachments to terms such as abstraction, concreteness, narration, illusionism, pop art, concept, realism. The 2. line is complementary to painting. Zwinger photographes as others would draw. Both basics cross correspondingly above the endpoints of visibility: resolution (painting) and concretion (photography). The 3. line attempts to transfer the problem between image and perception into the spatial. The sculptures of blown glass volumes, or of alienated packaging, which are designed as objects, are to investigate the phenomenon of appearance.

He lives in both Greifswald and Berlin. He is an ancestor of Eugen Zwinger.

== Individual exhibitions (selection) ==
- 2016: Palmers Pausen, Gallery Werner Tammen, Berlin
- 2014: New Works, Gallery Werner Tammen, Berlin
- 2009: Lichtsmoke, Gallery Werner Tammen, Berlin
- 2007: Kabuff N.K.23, Howard Scott Gallery, New York
- 2006: Kabuff N.K.23, Gallery Werner Tammen, Checkpoint Charlie, Berlin
- 2002: Bruch und Übergang / Rupture and Transition, Gallery Werner Tammen, Berlin
- 2002: Black Paintings / The Same Things That Make You Live Will Kill You, Gallery Paul Veron, Greifswald
- 1995: Die Stadt als Interieur, museum of the hanse town Greifswald, today Pommersches Landesmuseum, Greifswald
- 1994: Works on paper, Holly Affinity Galerie, Taipei City, Taiwan (R.O.C.), 1994

== Exhibitions ==
- 2016: ZWINGER : new works : Lucid 2, art Karlsruhe
- 2015: ZWINGER : recent, Art Fair Miami
- 2006: STANDPUNKTE II 1986 bis 2006 – paintings, sculptures, graphics from the collection of the Museum Junge Kunst (Museum of Young Art) Frankfurt (Oder), Kunstraum Potsdam
- 2004: all about… berlin White Box Gallery, Munich, 2004

== Works in public collections ==
- Sammlungen Staatliche Schlösser und Museen (National Castles and Museums Collections), Schwerin
- Collection Willy-Brandt-Haus, Berlin
- Collection Museum Junge Kunst, Frankfurt/Oder

== Literature, catalogues, publications ==
- Michael Freitag: Palmers Pausen, Malerei in Aspik, Gallery Werner Tammen, Berlin 2016
- Palmers Pausen, In: Frankfurter Allgemeine Zeitung from August 25, 2016 (whole article behind paywall)
- Michael Freitag: Kabuff N.K.23, Gallery Werner Tammen, Berlin, 2006, ISBN 978-3-00-020257-5
- Michael Freitag: Bruch und Übergang (Rupture and Transition), Berlin, 2002
- Johannes Stettin: Die Stadt als Interieur, Berlin, 1995
- "SMS an CDF", In: Frankfurter Allgemeine Zeitung from February 7, 2013 (whole article behind paywall)
- "Stromer, wo warst du?. In: Frankfurter Allgemeine Zeitung vom December 15, 2011 (whole article behind paywall)

== Literature ==
- "Der Maler Zwinger - Das wirklich Neue ist das nicht Erklärbare" Ingeborg Ruthe, January 18, 2007, article in Berliner Zeitung
- "Unterhalb der Romantikschwelle", Detlef Stapf, January 25, 2007, article in Norddeutsche Neuste Nachrichten
- "Zwinger zwingt's", Gerhard Charles Rump, January 13, 2007, article in DIE WELT
- "Der Nähe spröder Klang", Michaela Christen, September 1, 2006, article in Schweriner Volkszeitung
- Veit Stiller (2002-06-28). "Entdeckung: Torsten Zwinger bei Tammen und Busch". welt.de (in German).
- "ZWINGER: Der verstellte Raum", NDR TV, Hamburg 2000
