= Papenhagen =

- Municipality
- Location of Papenhagen within Vorpommern-Rügen district
- Interactive map of Papenhagen
- Location within Germany Location within Mecklenburg-Vorpommern
- Coordinates: 54°09′N 12°59′E
- Country: Germany
- State: Mecklenburg-Vorpommern
- District: Vorpommern-Rügen
- Municipal assoc.: Franzburg-Richtenberg

Government
  - Mayor: Ilona Kindler

Area
  - Total: 20.84 km^{2} (8.05 sq mi)
- Elevation: 14 m (46 ft)

Population (2025-12-31)
  - Total: 521
  - Density: 25.0/km^{2} (64.7/sq mi)
- Time zone: UTC+01:00 (CET)
  - Summer (DST): UTC+02:00 (CEST)
- Postal codes: 18510
- Dialling codes: 038325
- Vehicle registration: NVP
- Website: www.amt-franzburg-richtenberg.de

Papenhagen is a municipality in the Vorpommern-Rügen district, in Mecklenburg-Vorpommern, Germany.
