= Thomas Kietzmann =

German physician and biochemist

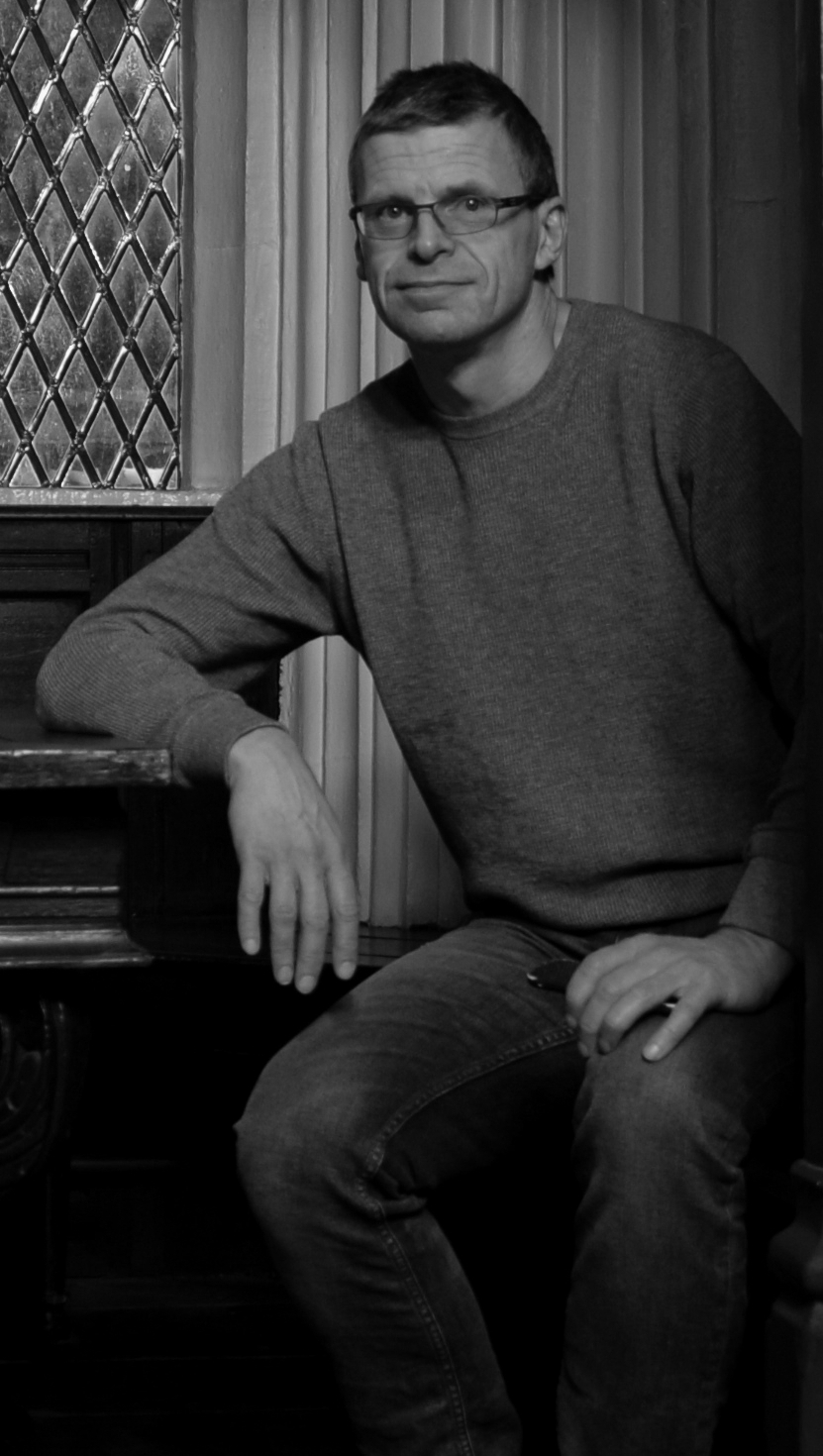
Thomas Kietzmann

Thomas Kietzmann (* in Greifswald) is a German physician and biochemist. He is a professor for biochemistry at the University of Oulu in Finland.

== Career ==
Thomas Kietzmann studied medicine at the University of Greifswald in Germany and finished his studies in 1989 with the degree "Diplom-Mediziner". As a UNESCO International Training Research Fellow he was working from 1989 at the Institute for Genetics of the Hungarian Academy of Sciences Institute for Genetics in Szeged, Hungary. Two years later he obtained his doctorate at the University of Greifswald. He continued his research as a post-doctoral fellow at the University of Göttingen, qualified in 1996 as "Facharzt" (consultant) and obtained his habilitation in 2001 at the Institute for Biochemistry and Molecular Cellular Biology. He continued his research as a "Privatdozent" (assistant professor) and was promoted to full professor in 2004 at the University of Kaiserslautern. 2009 he moved to the Faculty for Biochemistry and Molecular Medicine at the University of Oulu as professor for Cellular Biochemistry.

== Research ==
Kietzmann's research interests are based on topics such as oxygen sensing, hemostasis, oncology und cancer research, liver research (functions, metabolism, diet), oxidative stress and reactive oxygen species (ROS). He has contributed to the area of transcriptional regulation of the Plasminogen activator inhibitor-1 (PAI-1) gene by hypoxia and other mediators. He is leading research in a variety of national, international and EU projects and has been scientific advisor for multiple organisations, including the European Commission. Kietzmann received various academic awards and honours, including an award by the German Association of the Study of the Liver (GASL) and of the Austrian Society for Thrombose and Hemostasis Research (Gesellschaft für Thrombose- und Hämostaseforschung (GTH)).

== Awards and honours ==
Kietzmann was awarded the Knight's Badge of the Order of the White Rose of Finland 1st class on the occasion of the Independence Day of Finland in December 2023.

== Publications ==
To date (March 2020) Kietzmann has published more than 150 scientific contributions in journals and books.

- Gerhard P. Püschel, Thomas Kietzmann, Detlef Doenecke, Hartmut Kühn, Wolfgang Höhne, Bruno Christ, Jan Koolman: Taschenlehrbuch Biochemie. Thieme 2011, ISBN 978-3-13-148691-2.
- A. Görlach, P. Klappa, T. Kietzmann: The endoplasmic reticulum: Folding, calcium homeostasis, signaling, and redox control In: Antioxidants & Redox Signaling. Volume 8, Issue 9-10, September 2006, Pages 1391-1418
- A. Görlach, I. Diebold, V. B. Schini-Kerth, U. Berchner-Pfannschmidt, U. Roth, R. P. Brandes, T. Kietzmann, R. Busse: Thrombin activates the hypoxia-inducible factor-1 signaling pathway in vascular smooth muscle cells role of the p22phox-containing NADPH oxidase In: Circulation Research. Volume 89, Issue 1, 6 July 2001, Pages 47–54
- S. Bonello, C. Zähringer, R. S. BelAiba, T. Djordjevic, J. Hess, C. Michiels, T. Kietzmann, A. Görlach: Reactive oxygen species activate the HIF-1α promoter via a functional NFκB site. In: Arteriosclerosis, Thrombosis, and Vascular Biology. Volume 27, Issue 4, April 2007, Pages 755-761.
