= Zwinger (Münster) =

Coordinates: 51°58′03.30″N 7°37′54.10″E

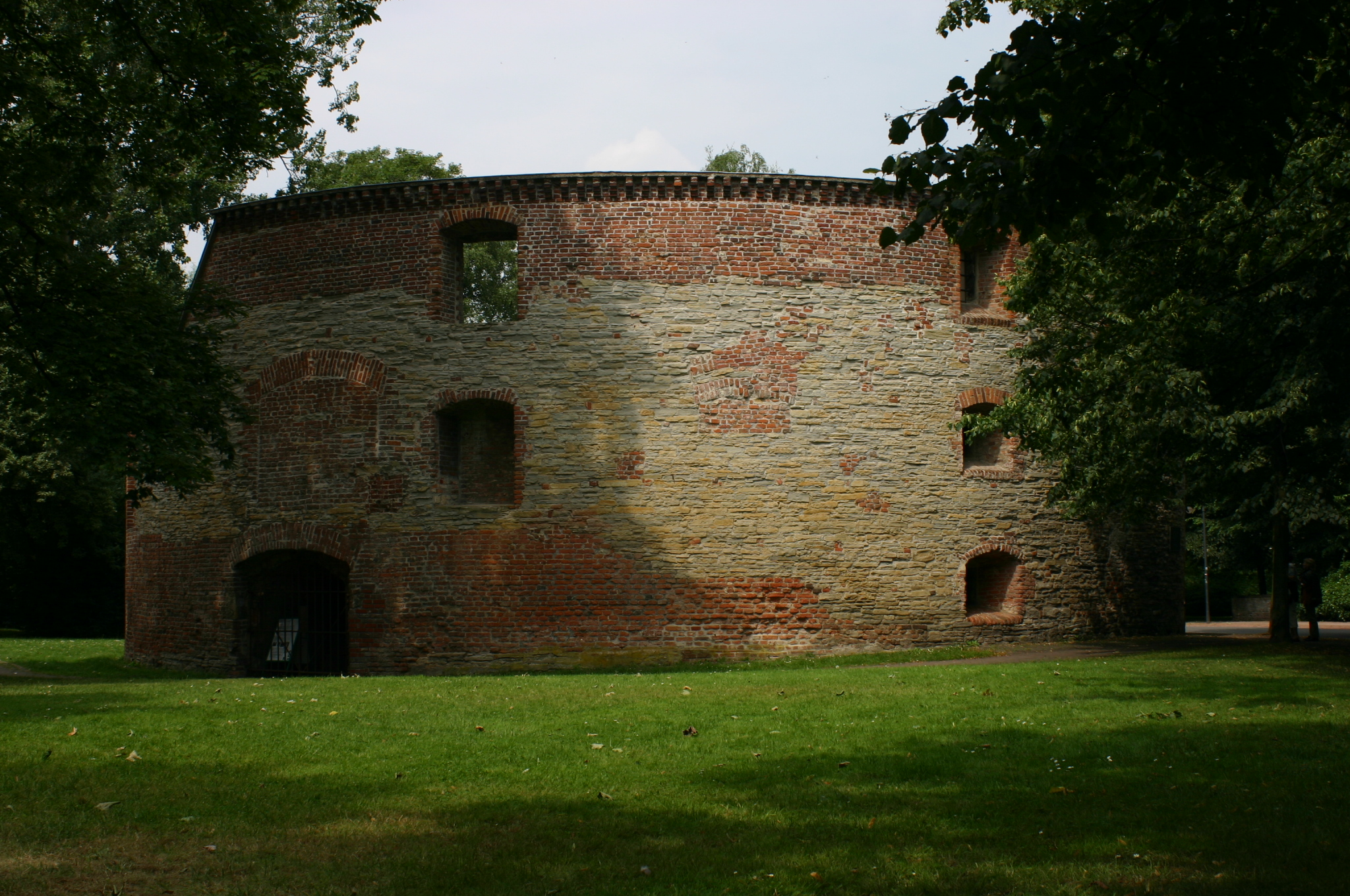
The Zwinger on the present day Promenade.

The Zwinger in the Westphalian city of Münster is part of the old city fortifications from the Early Modern Period. In the Nazi era it was both a jail and a Gestapo place of execution and was heavily damaged by allied air raids. Since its conversion to a memorial the Zwinger has belonged to the Münster City Museum (Stadtmuseum Münster) and is home to the sculpture Das gegenläufige Konzert.
