= University of Greifswald Faculty of Arts =

Faculty of Philosophy
- Philosophische Fakultät der Ernst-Moritz-Arndt-Universität Greifswald
- Type: Faculty
- Established: 1456
- Affiliations: University of Greifswald
- Location: Greifswald, Mecklenburg-Vorpommern, Germany; 54°5′39.21″N 13°22′34.41″E
- Website: www.phil.uni-greifswald.de

The Faculty of Philosophy of Greifswald University (German: Philosophische Fakultät der Ernst-Moritz-Arndt-Universität Greifswald) is one of five faculties and the founding faculty of the University of Greifswald in Greifswald, Germany.

The faculty's research and teaching focuses on languages and cultures of Northern and Eastern Europe. Subjects, such as Latvian and Lithuanian Studies, Slavic Studies, Finnish Studies (including Estonian Studies) and Scandinavian Studies are offered by only a few other universities in Germany.

Other classic disciplines, such as German Studies, English Studies and studies of History, Political Science, Philosophy, Psychology, Church Music and Music are offered as well. The Caspar-David-Friedrich-Institut, which was named after the 19th-century German Romantic landscape painter Caspar David Friedrich, who was born in Greifswald and received his first artistic lessons here, offers degrees in Fine Arts and Art History.

Like many other universities in Germany, the Faculty of Philosophy (Philosophische Fakultät) of Greifswald University is now offering bachelor's and master's degree courses to cater to the wider interests of students. The undergraduate programmes have course duration of three years; the postgraduate programmes have course duration of two years.

In addition to the usual course programmes, the Faculty of Philosophy founded the Centre of the Middle Ages (Mittelalterzentrum) in 1995. The Mittelalterzentrum is an association of 20 academics of all faculties doing interdisciplinary research and providing students and scholars with lectures concerning life and culture in the Middle Ages. It is further a programme which is not only open for graduates and professors, but for anyone who is interested in the study of different points of view on the Middle Ages, such as literary, historical, medical or any other point of view. Each year, associates of the Mittelalterzentrum organize a series of lectures, held by scholars from Greifswald University and other renowned universities.

Apart from wide range of course offers provided by the Faculty of Philosophy, the faculty is greatly interested in organizing cultural events, such as Nordischer Klang, PolenmARkT and the Bachwoche. The international festival Nordischer Klang, which presents a programme filled with different events ranging from Jazz and Classic concerts to art exhibitions, is associated with the Department of Nordic and Finnish Studies. The PolenmARkT, on the other hand, focuses on the culture of Poland and is co-organized by the Department of Modern Languages, and in particular by the division of Slavic Studies. Each year for two weeks people are invited to attend Polish lectures and readings about Poland and its people, as well as several movies and documentaries and of course, as the name suggests, a market with typical Polish goods. The Bachwoche, associated with the Department of Music and Church Music, is anotherfestival and dedicated to the German composer, organist, harpsichordist, violist and violinist Johann Sebastian Bach, whose sacred and secular works for choir, orchestra and solo instruments drew together the strands of the Baroque period. During that week people are able to enjoy concerts and church services where some of Bach's more or less famous works are being played by the university's music ensembles, as well as lectures about Bach, his music and choir practices to sing along.

== Departments ==
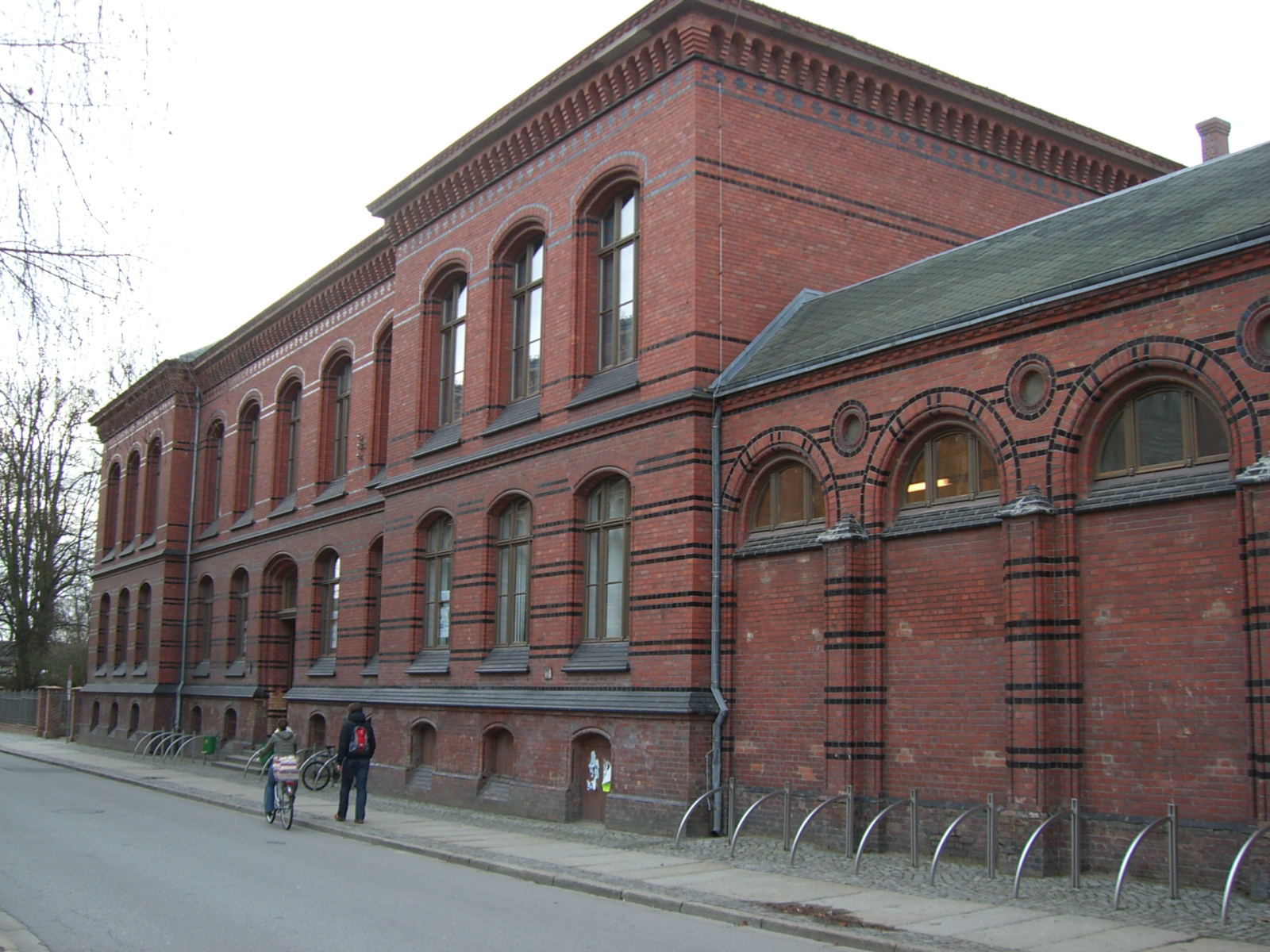
lecture hall ("auditorium maximum")

=== Church Music and Music ===
The Department of Church Music and Music is a small institution which enhances the music culture of Greifswald with public concerts, lectures and yearly events, such as the Greifswalder Bachwoche. It is further in charge of several ensembles, such as the chamber choir, cathedral choir, university choir and university symphony orchestra.

=== Fine art ===
The Department of Fine Art (Caspar-David-Friedrich-Institut) is named after the Romantic landscape painter Caspar David Friedrich, who received his first art instructions in Greifswald. The department is a uniquely combined department of applied arts and art history, which are usually separated in Germany.

=== German ===
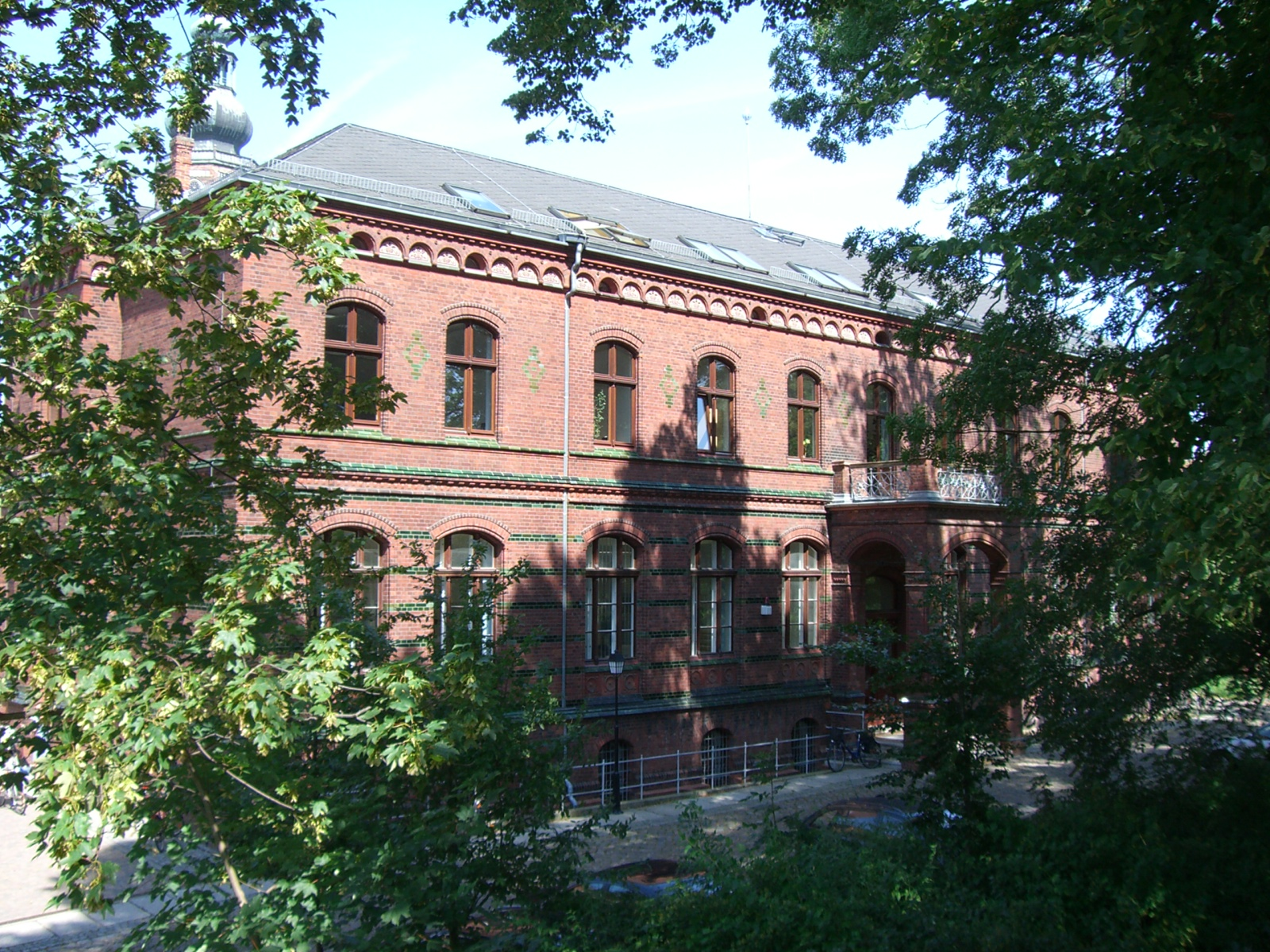
Dept. of German studies (outside)

The Department of German was founded in 1876 and is divided into the following areas of expertise:

- Medieval German language and literature
- German Linguistics
- Modern German Literature
- German as a Foreign Language
- Wolfgang Koeppen Archive
- Pomeranian Dictionary

=== History ===
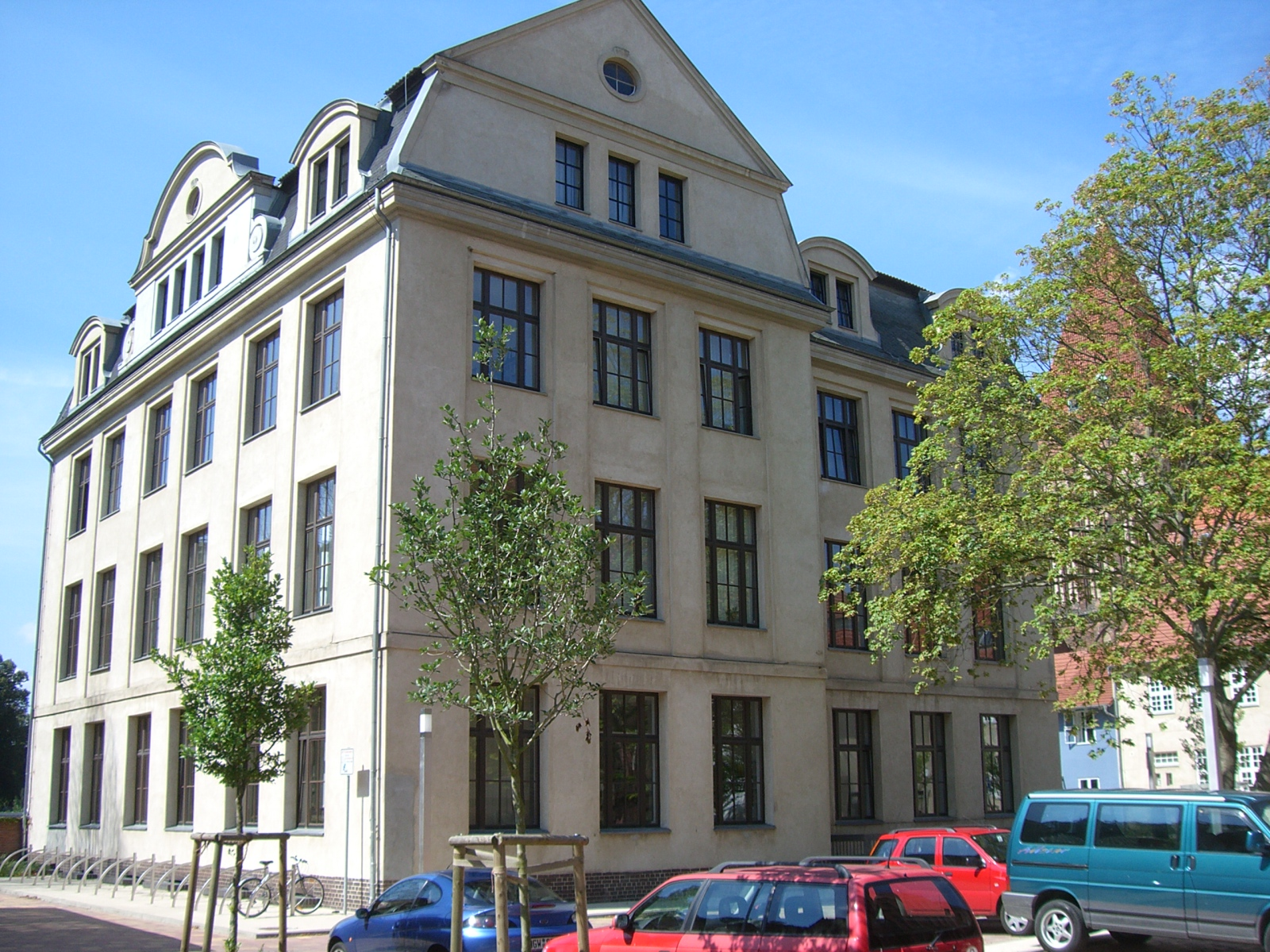
Dept. of History

When the very first Department of History was founded in 1863 as the first one in Prussia, and the fourth in the whole of Germany.

Research and studies at the Department of History in Prussia was founded in 1863, there existed only three other departments of that kind in Germany. Areas of expertise at the Department of History are:

- German History
- General European History, and particularly Eastern European
- Nordic history

The latter area of expertise represents a special interest Greifswald University has due to its close relations to the Eastern countries.

=== Modern Languages ===
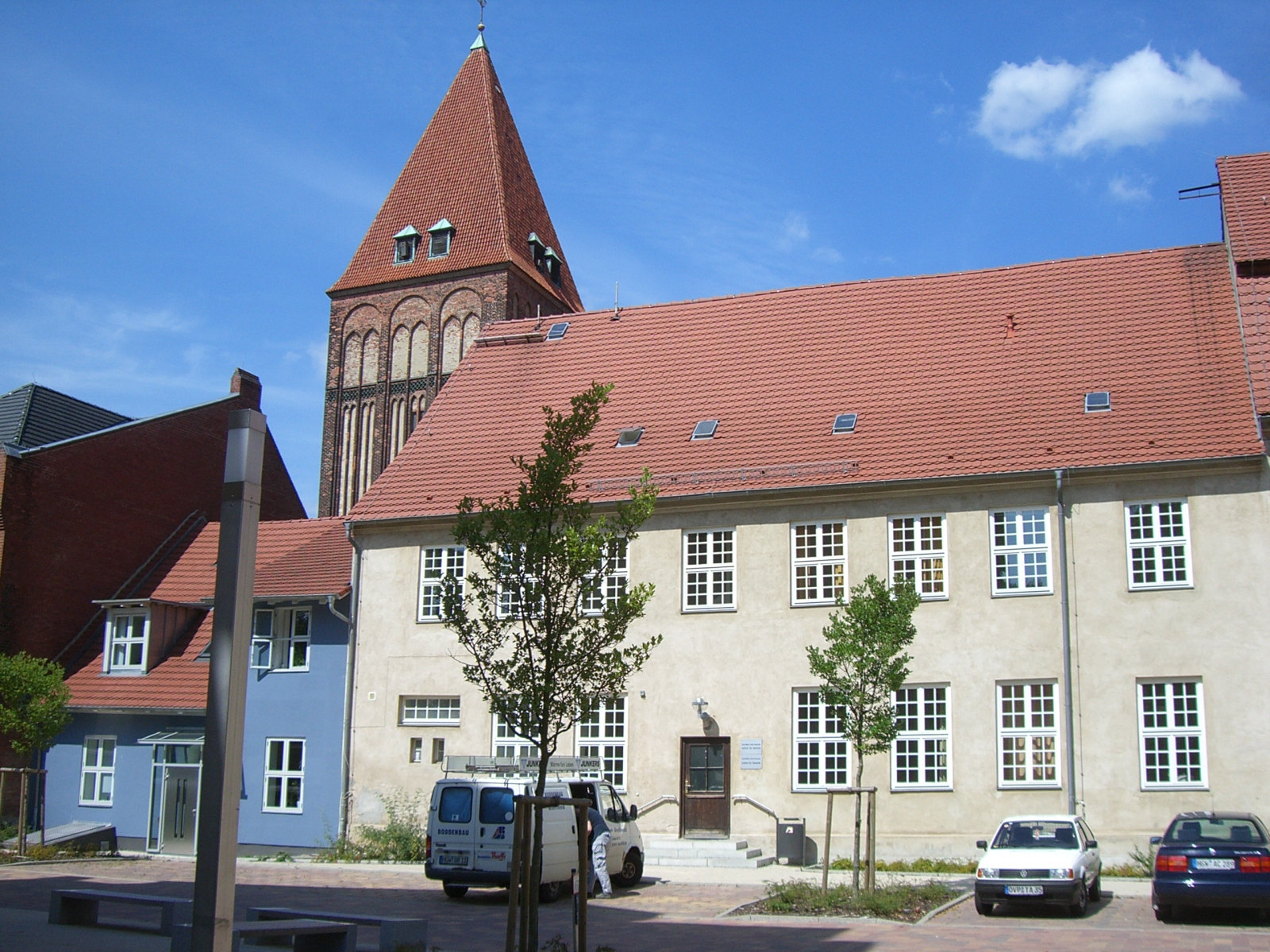
Baltic and Slavic Studies (grau)

In 1777, the Greifswald University was the first German university which ran a course of studies in the English tongue. In 1853, then, a Department of Modern Languages in Greifswald was founded.

The division of English provides courses for studies in the languages, literatures and cultures of the English-speaking countries. In addition, the Greifswald Canadian Fellow in Residence programme, funded by Greifswald University and the Canadian government, provides support for a Canadian author in order to live and write in Greifswald for one academic year. The fellows usually contribute to authentic, up-to-date teaching in the English Department and they often take part in events that are open to the general public. Two of the former fellows were Warren Cariou (2005), and Janice Kulyk Keefer (2006).

The Division of Baltic Studies is the only institution in Germany whose research and teaching interests rest upon the languages, literatures and cultures of Latvia and Lithuania, and, in fact, one of the few in the world.

The division of Nordic and Finnish Studies is one of the most traditional and largest institutions of its kind outside northern Europe. It altogether consists of four areas of expertise (Fennistic, Scandinavian Modern Literature, Scandinavian Linguistics, Medieval and Diachronic Linguistics) as well as five lectorships (Danish, Finnish, Icelandic, Norwegian, Swedish) which offer oral language lessons in Danish, Estonian, Finnish, Faeroese, Icelandic, Norwegian and Swedish.

The division of Slavic studies focuses on the research of the languages and literatures of the Slavic countries, such as Poland, Russia, Czech Republic, Slovak Republic and Ukraine. It is further in charge of the PolenmARkT.

=== Philosophy ===
The Department of Philosophy is divided into the following areas of expertise:

- Practical Philosophy
- Theoretical Philosophy
- Aesthetics and Cultural Philosophy

=== Studies in Political and Communication Science ===
The Department of Political and Communication Science is methodological based on social science and is divided into the following areas of expertise:

- Political Theory and History of Ideas (Prof. Dr. Hubertus Buchstein)
- International Relations and Area Studies (Prof. Dr. Margit Bussmann)
- Comparative Politics (Prof. Dr. Detlef Jahn)
- Comparative Politics (Prof. Dr. Corinna Kroeber)
- Political Sociology (vacant)
- Communication Studies (Prof. Dr. Klaus Beck)
- Organizational Communication (Prof. Dr. Kerstin Thummes)

There are offered two Bachelor programs (B.A. Political Science; B.A. Communication Studies) and three Master programs (M.A. Democracy Studies; M.A. Language and Communication; M.A. Organizational Communication).

The professor for Political Philosophy, Prof. Dr. Hubertus Buchstein, used to be chairman of the Deutsche Gesellschaft für Politikwissenschaft (German Association of Political Science) from 2009-2012.

=== Education ===
The Department of Education offers courses in teacher training, i.e. paedagogy.

== Programmes ==
=== Bachelor of Arts ===
The Bachelor of Arts programmes at Greifswald University are two-subject programmes, meaning that students study any combination of two of the following disciplines:

- Art History
- Communication Science
- English Language and Literature
- Fine Art
- Finnish Languages and Literatures
- German Language and Literature
- German as a Foreign Language
- History
- Latvian and Lithuanian Language and Literature
- Music
- Musical Science
- Philosophy
- Law (in cooperation with the Faculty of Law and Economics)
- Business (in cooperation with the Faculty of Law and Economics)
- Scandinavian Languages and Literatures
- Slavic Languages and Literatures

=== Master of Arts ===
The Master of Arts programmes are in only one of the following subjects:

- Art History
- British and North American Studies
- German as a Foreign Language
- Finnish Languages and Literatures
- Fine Arts
- German literature
- History
- Intercultural Linguistics
- Language and Communication
- Organizational communication
- Philosophy
- Political Science: Democracy and Globalisation
- Scandinavian languages and literatures
- Slavic languages and literatures

== Associated people ==
Former staff members include Ernst Moritz Arndt, Alfred Gomolka, Otto Jahn, Johannes Voigt, Georg Friedrich Schömann, and Ulrich von Wilamowitz-Moellendorff.

The painter Caspar David Friedrich is a former student of Greifswald University, who received his first art lessons by one of the university's professors.
