= Wendisch Baggendorf =

- Municipality
- Location of Wendisch Baggendorf within Vorpommern-Rügen district
- Interactive map of Wendisch Baggendorf
- Location within Germany Location within Mecklenburg-Vorpommern
- Coordinates: 54°05′N 12°57′E
- Country: Germany
- State: Mecklenburg-Vorpommern
- District: Vorpommern-Rügen
- Municipal assoc.: Franzburg-Richtenberg

Government
  - Mayor: Christiane Opitz

Area
  - Total: 21.32 km^{2} (8.23 sq mi)
- Elevation: 19 m (62 ft)

Population (2025-12-31)
  - Total: 526
  - Density: 24.7/km^{2} (63.9/sq mi)
- Time zone: UTC+01:00 (CET)
  - Summer (DST): UTC+02:00 (CEST)
- Postal codes: 18513
- Dialling codes: 038326
- Vehicle registration: NVP
- Website: www.amt-franzburg-richtenberg.de

Wendisch Baggendorf is a municipality in the Vorpommern-Rügen district, in Mecklenburg-Vorpommern, Germany.
