= Splietsdorf =

- Municipality
- Location of Splietsdorf within Vorpommern-Rügen district
- Interactive map of Splietsdorf
- Location within Germany Location within Mecklenburg-Vorpommern
- Coordinates: 54°08′N 12°56′E
- Country: Germany
- State: Mecklenburg-Vorpommern
- District: Vorpommern-Rügen
- Municipal assoc.: Franzburg-Richtenberg

Government
  - Mayor: Burghard Rübcke von Veltheim

Area
  - Total: 26.29 km^{2} (10.15 sq mi)
- Elevation: 14 m (46 ft)

Population (2025-12-31)
  - Total: 487
  - Density: 18.5/km^{2} (48.0/sq mi)
- Time zone: UTC+01:00 (CET)
  - Summer (DST): UTC+02:00 (CEST)
- Postal codes: 18513
- Dialling codes: 038325
- Vehicle registration: NVP
- Website: www.amt-franzburg-richtenberg.de

Splietsdorf is a municipality in the Vorpommern-Rügen district, in Mecklenburg-Vorpommern, Germany.
