= Franzburg-Richtenberg =

- Amt
- Location of Franzburg-Richtenberg within Vorpommern-Rügen district
- Interactive map of Franzburg-Richtenberg
- Location within Germany Location within Mecklenburg-Vorpommern
- Coordinates: 54°09′N 12°54′E
- Country: Germany
- State: Mecklenburg-Vorpommern
- District: Vorpommern-Rügen
- Seat: Franzburg
- Subdivisions: 10 municipalities

Area
  - Total: 306.39 km^{2} (118.30 sq mi)

Population (2025-12-31)
  - Total: 7,194
  - Density: 23.48/km^{2} (60.81/sq mi)
- Time zone: UTC+01:00 (CET)
  - Summer (DST): UTC+02:00 (CEST)
- Website: www.amt-franzburg-richtenberg.de

Franzburg-Richtenberg is an Amt in the district of Vorpommern-Rügen, in Mecklenburg-Vorpommern, Germany. The seat of the Amt is in Franzburg.

The Amt Franzburg-Richtenberg consists of the following municipalities:

1. Franzburg
2. Glewitz
3. Gremersdorf-Buchholz
4. Millienhagen-Oebelitz
5. Papenhagen
6. Richtenberg
7. Splietsdorf
8. Velgast
9. Weitenhagen
10. Wendisch Baggendorf
