= Eastern Pomerania =

Eastern Pomerania can refer to distinct parts of Pomerania:

- The historical region of Farther Pomerania, which was the eastern part of the Duchy, later Province of Pomerania
- The historical region of Pomerelia including Gdańsk Pomerania, located east of Farther Pomerania

== Terminology ==
The term "West Pomerania" is ambiguous, since it may refer to either Hither Pomerania (in German usage and historical usage based on German terminology), to both Hither and Farther Pomerania combined, or to the West Pomeranian Voivodeship (in Polish usage).

The term "East Pomerania" may similarly carry different meanings, referring either to Farther Pomerania (in German usage and historical usage based on German terminology), to Pomerelia, or to the Pomeranian Voivodeship (in Polish usage).

	West	Pomerania																					East	Southeast				
Main cities (Note: Modern major cities and historically major cities (e.g., former regional capitals).) (Note: Modern provincial capitals in bold, former ducal and provincial capitals in italics.)	Stralsund	Greifswald, Wolgast					Szczecin		Stargard	Koszalin, Kołobrzeg	Sławno, Darłowo	Słupsk	Lębork							Gdańsk; Gdynia	Gdańsk (partially)			Tczew, Starogard Gdański				Toruń, Grudziądz, Chełmno
Other towns	Damgarten, Barth, Tribsees, Grimmen, Franzburg, Richtenberg, Bergen auf Rügen, Garz/Rügen, Sassnitz, Putbus	Loitz, Lassan, Gützkow	Demmin, Altentreptow	Jarmen, Anklam, Usedom	Pasewalk, Torgelow, Ueckermünde, Eggesin, Penkun	Prenzlau, Brüssow, Gartz, Schwedt (part north of Wesel with inland port)	Świnoujście, Międzyzdroje, Wolin, Dziwnów (left-bank), Goleniów, Police, Nowe Warpno, Dąbie	Widuchowa, Gryfino, Banie, Pyrzyce	Maszewo, Stepnica, Dziwnów, (Note: Right-bank with historic centre.); Kamień Pomorski, Golczewo, Ińsko, Dobrzany, Chociwel, Gryfice, Gościno, Płoty, Nowogard, Łobez, Węgorzyno, Resko, Trzebiatów, Dobra, Suchań	Świdwin, Połczyn-Zdrój, Drawsko Pomorskie, Karlino, Tychowo, Bobolice, Białogard, Szczecinek, Mielno, Kalisz Pomorski, (Note: Also considered part of the historical region of Greater Poland in the medieval period.); Złocieniec, Barwice	Polanów, Sianów	Ustka, Miastko, Kobylnica	Bytów, Łeba	Biały Bór	Czarne, Człuchów	Chojnice	Ostrowite	Borowy Młyn, Borzyszkowy	Czersk, Brusy	Kościerzyna, Kartuzy, Żukowo, Puck, Władysławowo, Jastarnia, Hel, Wejherowo, Reda, Rumia, Sopot	Pruszcz Gdański, Nowy Staw	Krynica Morska	Narmeln	Skarszewy, Pelplin, Gniew, Skórcz	Świecie, Nowe	Obrowo	Tuchola, Pruszcz	Chełmża, Wąbrzeźno, Kowalewo Pomorskie, Jabłonowo Pomorskie, Radzyń Chełmiński, Łasin, Brodnica, (Note: Part north of Drwęca with historic center.); Golub, Ostromecko
Current countries	Germany						Poland																Russia	Poland				
Current administrative regions	Land Mecklenburg-Vorpommern (State of Mecklenburg-Western Pomerania)					Land Brandenburg (State of Brandenburg)	województwo zachodniopomorskie (West Pomeranian Voivodeship)					województwo pomorskie (Pomeranian Voivodeship)		województwo zachodniopom. (West Pomeranian Voivodeship)	województwo pomorskie (Pomeranian Voivodeship)								Калининградская область (Kaliningrad Oblast)	województwo pomorskie (Pomeranian Voivodeship)	województwo kujawsko-pomorskie (Kuyavian-Pomeranian Voivodeship)			
Current administrative regions	Vorpommern-Rügen District	Vorpommern-Greifswald District	Mecklenburgische Seenplatte District	Vorpommern-Greifswald District		Uckermark District	województwo zachodniopomorskie (West Pomeranian Voivodeship)					województwo pomorskie (Pomeranian Voivodeship)		województwo zachodniopom. (West Pomeranian Voivodeship)	województwo pomorskie (Pomeranian Voivodeship)								Калининградская область (Kaliningrad Oblast)	województwo pomorskie (Pomeranian Voivodeship)	województwo kujawsko-pomorskie (Kuyavian-Pomeranian Voivodeship)			
German terminology (corresponding English term)	Pommern (Pomerania)													Pomerellen, Pommerellen (Pomerelia); After Partitions of Poland, part of the wider Westpreussen (West Prussia) before Partitions of Poland, part of the wider Königlich-Preußen or Preußen Königlichen Anteils (Royal Prussia)														
German terminology (corresponding English term)	Vorpommern in modern usage the part located in Germany only (Hither Pomerania, Fore Pomerania)							Hinterpommern (Farther/Further Pomerania, Rear Pomerania)								Tucheler Heide (Tuchola Forest)		Kaschubei (Kashubia)				Frische Nehrung (Vistula Spit)		Kociewie		Tucheler Heide (Tuchola Forest)		Kulmerland (Chełmno Land)
German terminology (corresponding English term)	Neuvorpommern (New Hither Pomerania)		Altvorpommern (Old Hither Pomerania)					Hinterpommern (Farther/Further Pomerania, Rear Pomerania)								Tucheler Heide (Tuchola Forest)		Kaschubei (Kashubia)				Frische Nehrung (Vistula Spit)		Kociewie		Tucheler Heide (Tuchola Forest)		Kulmerland (Chełmno Land)
German terminology (corresponding English term)	Westpommern (Western Pomerania)			Mittelpommern (Middle Pomerania)						Ostpommern (Eastern Pomerania)						Tucheler Heide (Tuchola Forest)		Kaschubei (Kashubia)				Frische Nehrung (Vistula Spit)		Kociewie		Tucheler Heide (Tuchola Forest)		Kulmerland (Chełmno Land)
German terminology (corresponding English term)	Westpommern (Western Pomerania)				Mittelpommerscher Keil (Middle Pomeranian Wedge) excluding Świnoujście, Międzyzdroje, Wolin and Dziwnów						Lande Schlawe und Stolp (Lands of Schlawe and Stolp)		Lande Lauenburg und Bütow (Lauenburg and Bütow Land)				Koschneiderei	Kaschubei (Kashubia)				Frische Nehrung (Vistula Spit)		Kociewie		Koschneiderei		Kulmerland (Chełmno Land)
Polish terminology (corresponding English term)	Pomorze Zachodnie (Western Pomerania); Pomorze Nadodrzańskie (Oder Pomerania)												Pomorze Wschodnie (Eastern Pomerania); Pomorze Nadwiślańskie (Vistula Pomerania) before World War II simply Pomorze (Pomerelia, literally Pomerania) before Partitions of Poland, part of the wider Prusy Królewskie (Royal Prussia)															
Polish terminology (corresponding English term)	Pomorze Zaodrzańskie (Trans-Oder Pomerania); Pomorze Wołogoskie (Wołogoszcz or German: Wolgast Pomerania)						Pomorze Szczecińskie (Szczecin Pomerania); Pomorze Zachodnie w węższym znaczeniu (Western Pomerania in narrower sense)			Pomorze Środkowe (Middle Pomerania); Pomorze Koszalińsko-Słupskie (Koszalin and Słupsk Pomerania)			Pomorze Gdańskie (Gdańsk Pomerania)															Ziemia chełmińska (Chełmno Land)
Polish terminology (corresponding English term)	Pomorze Przednie (Hither Pomerania, Fore Pomerania) in modern usage the part located in Germany only							Pomorze Tylne (Farther/Further Pomerania, Rear Pomerania) usage limited mainly to translations of German texts					Kaszuby (Kashubia)			Bory Tucholskie (Tuchola Forest) ethnocultural region		Kaszuby (Kashubia) ethnocultural region			Żuławy Wiślane (Vistula Fens)	Mierzeja Wiślana (Vistula Spit)		Kociewie ethnocultural region		Bory Tucholskie (Tuchola Forest)		Ziemia chełmińska (Chełmno Land)
Polish terminology (corresponding English term)	Pomorze Przednie (Hither Pomerania, Fore Pomerania) in modern usage the part located in Germany only										Ziemia słupsko-sławieńska (Słupsk and Sławno Land)		Ziemia lęborsko-bytowska (Lębork and Bytów Land)				Kosznajderia former ethnocultural region	Gochy	Zabory		Żuławy Wiślane (Vistula Fens)	Mierzeja Wiślana (Vistula Spit)		Kociewie ethnocultural region		Kosznajderia former ethnocultural region		Ziemia chełmińska (Chełmno Land)
Kashubian terminology (corresponding English term)	Zôpadnô Pòmòrskô (Western Pomerania)												Lãbòrskò-bëtowskô Zemia (Lębork and Bytów Land)	Pòrénkòwô Pòmòrskô (Eastern Pomerania)														
Kashubian terminology (corresponding English term)	Zôpadnô Pòmòrskô (Western Pomerania)												Lãbòrskò-bëtowskô Zemia (Lębork and Bytów Land)					Kaszëbë (Kashubia) ethnocultural region			Wiselny Zëławë (Vistula Fens)			Kòcéwskô (Kociewie) ethnocultural region		Tëchòlsczé Bòrë (Tuchola Forest) ethnocultural region		Chełmińskô Zemia (Chełmno Land)
Kashubian terminology (corresponding English term)	Zôpadnô Pòmòrskô (Western Pomerania)												Lãbòrskò-bëtowskô Zemia (Lębork and Bytów Land)				Kòsznajderiô (Kosznajderia) former ethnocultural region	Gòchë (Gochy)	Zabòrë (Zabory)		Wiselny Zëławë (Vistula Fens)			Kòcéwskô (Kociewie) ethnocultural region		Kòsznajderiô (Kosznajderia) former ethnocultural region		Chełmińskô Zemia (Chełmno Land)

== See also ==
- Western Pomerania (disambiguation)
