= Bukowo, Bytów County =

Hamlet in Bytów County, Pomeranian Voivodeship, Poland

Bukowo
- Hamlet (colony)
- Location within Poland
- Coordinates: 53°59′21″N 17°16′48″E
- Country: Poland
- Voivodeship: Pomeranian
- County: Bytów
- Municipality: Lipnica
- Civil parish: Brzeźno Szlacheckie
- Time zone: UTC+1 (CET)
  - Summer (DST): UTC+2 (CEST)
- Postal code: 77-130
- Area code: +48 59
- Vehicle registration: GBY
- Climate: Cfb

Bukowo (Polish: [buˈkɔ.vɔ]; Kashubian: Bùkòwò, [bwuˈkwɛ.wɛ]) is a hamlet (colony) in the Pomeranian Voivodeship, Poland, located within the municipality of Lipnica in Bytów County. It forms a part of the civil parish of Brzeźno Szlacheckie. The settlement is located on the western shore of the Gwiazda Lake, within in the Bytowa Lake Region, and forming part of the cultural region of Gochy, which is a part of Kashubia.
