= Brzezieński Młyn =

Hamlet in Pomeranian Voivodeship, Poland

- Hamlet (colony)
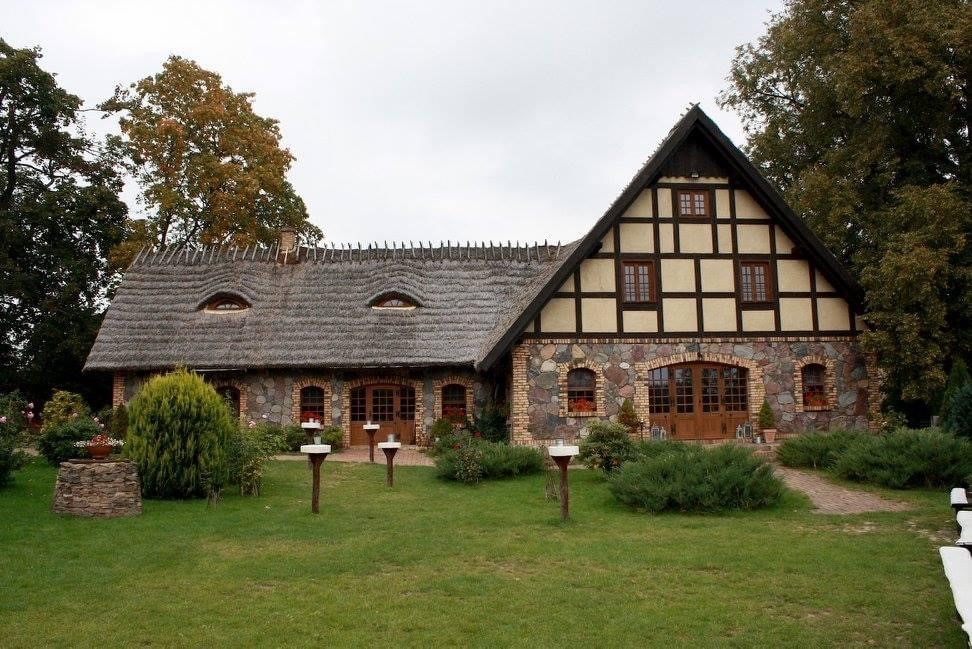
- An inn in Brzezieński Młyn.

- Location within Pomeranian Voivodeship Location within Poland
- Coordinates: 54°00′07″N 17°15′56″E
- Country: Poland
- Voivodeship: Pomeranian
- County: Bytów
- Municipality: Lipnica
- Civil parish: Łąkie
- Time zone: UTC+1 (CET)
  - Summer (DST): UTC+2 (CEST)
- Postal code: 77-130
- Climate: Cfb

Brzezieński Młyn (Polish pronunciation: [bʐɛˈʑi.ɛɲ.ski ˈmwɘ̟n]; Kashubian: Brzezyńsczi Młin, [ˈbr̝ɛ.ziɲ.st͡ʃi ˈmwin]; German until 1945: Briesenermühle, [ˈbʁiː.zn̩ɐ.mɪlɛ]) is a hamlet (colony) in the Pomeranian Voivodeship, Poland, located within the municipality of Lipnica in Bytów County. It is part of the civil parish of Łąkie. The hamlet is located on the northern shore of the Gwiazda Lake, in the Bytowa Lake Region. It is part of the cultural region of Gochy, which belongs to the larger region of Kashubia.
