= Rokitniki =

- Hamlet (colony)
- Location within Pomeranian Voivodeship Location within Poland
- Coordinates: 54°02′18″N 17°16′20″E
- Country: Poland
- Voivodeship: Pomeranian
- County: Bytów
- Gmina: Lipnica
- Sołectwo: Łąkie
- Time zone: UTC+1 (CET)
  - Summer (DST): UTC+2 (CEST)
- Postal code: 77-130
- Area code: +48 59
- Vehicle registration: GBY
- Climate: Cfb

Rokitniki (Polish: [rɔ.kitˈɲi.ki]; Kashubian: Rokitniczi [rɔ.kitˈɲi.t͡ʃi]) is a hamlet (colony) in the Pomeranian Voivodeship, Poland, within the Gmina Lipnica, Bytów County, in the sołectwo of Łąkie. It is located in the Bytowa Lake Region, within the cultural region of Gochy, which is a part of Kashubia.
