= Kocioł, Pomeranian Voivodeship =

Kocioł
- Hamlet (colony)
- Location within Poland
- Coordinates: 53°59′05″N 17°15′21″E
- Country: Poland
- Voivodeship: Pomeranian
- County: Bytów
- Gmina: Lipnica
- Sołectwo: Brzeźno Szlacheckie
- Time zone: UTC+1 (CET)
  - Summer (DST): UTC+2 (CEST)
- Postal code: 77-138
- Area code: +48 59
- Vehicle registration: GBY

Kocioł (Polish: [ˈkɔ.t͡ɕɔw], until 2016: Kocieł [ˈkɔ.t͡ɕɛw]; Kashubian: Kòcół [ˈkwɛ.t͡sow]) is a hamlet (colony) in the Pomeranian Voivodeship, Poland, within the Gmina Lipnica, Bytów County.
