= Brzósk =

- Hamlet
- Location within Pomeranian Voivodeship Location within Poland
- Coordinates: 54°03′54″N 17°25′01″E
- Country: Poland
- Voivodeship: Pomeranian
- County: Bytów
- Municipality: Lipnica
- Village assembly: Borzyszkowy
- Time zone: UTC+1 (CET)
  - Summer (DST): UTC+2 (CEST)
- Postal code: 77-130
- Area code: +48 59
- Vehicle registration: GBY
- Climate: Cfb

Brzósk (Polish: [bʐusk], Kashubian: [ˈbr̝osk]) is a hamlet in the Pomeranian Voivodeship, Poland, within the municipality of Lipnica in Bytów County. It is a part of the village assembly of Borzyszkowy.
