= Klewiska =

- Hamlet
- Location within Pomeranian Voivodeship Location within Poland
- Coordinates: 53°58′42″N 17°21′51″E
- Country: Poland
- Voivodeship: Pomeranian
- County: Bytów
- Gmina: Lipnica
- Sołectwo: Prądzona
- Time zone: UTC+1 (CET)
  - Summer (DST): UTC+2 (CEST)
- Postal code: 77-130
- Area code: +48 59
- Vehicle registration: GBY
- Climate: Cfb

Klewiska (Polish: [klɛˈvis.ka], Kashubian: [klɛˈvis.ka]) is a hamlet in the Pomeranian Voivodeship, Poland, within the Gmina Lipnica, Bytów County, in the sołectwo of Prądzona.
