= Hamer-Młyn =

- Village
- Location within Poland
- Coordinates: 54°2′5″N 17°30′23″E
- Country: Poland
- Voivodeship: Pomeranian
- County: Bytów
- Gmina: Lipnica
- Population: 12

Hamer-Młyn ([ˈxamɛr ˈmwɨn]) is a village in the administrative district of Gmina Lipnica, within Bytów County, Pomeranian Voivodeship, in northern Poland.
