= Mogiel =

- Village
- Location within Poland
- Coordinates: 53°55′45″N 17°29′13″E
- Country: Poland
- Voivodeship: Pomeranian
- County: Bytów
- Gmina: Lipnica
- Population: 18

Mogiel [ˈmɔɡʲɛl] is a village in the administrative district of Gmina Lipnica, within Bytów County, Pomeranian Voivodeship, in northern Poland.
