= Bydgoszcz, Pomeranian Voivodeship =

Bydgoszcz
- Settlement
- Location within Poland
- Coordinates: 53°58′26″N 17°15′42″E
- Country: Poland
- Voivodeship: Pomeranian
- County: Bytów
- Gmina: Lipnica
- Population: 4

Bydgoszcz (Polish pronunciation: [ˈbɨdɡɔʂt͡ʂ]) is a settlement in the administrative district of Gmina Lipnica, within Bytów County, Pomeranian Voivodeship, in northern Poland.

For details of the history of the region, see history of Pomerania.
