= Osusznica =

- Village
- Location within Poland
- Coordinates: 53°58′15″N 17°23′52″E
- Country: Poland
- Voivodeship: Pomeranian
- County: Bytów
- Gmina: Lipnica
- Population: 124
- Time zone: UTC+1 (CET)
  - Summer (DST): UTC+2 (CEST)
- Vehicle registration: GBY

Osusznica [ɔsuʂˈnit͡sa] is a village in Gmina Lipnica, Bytów County, Pomeranian Voivodeship, in northern Poland. It is located within the ethnocultural region of Kashubia in the historic region of Pomerania.

== History ==
Osusznica was a royal village of the Polish Crown, administratively located in the Człuchów County in the Pomeranian Voivodeship.

From 1975 to 1998 the village was in Słupsk Voivodeship.

== Notable people ==
- Henryk Mądrawski (1933–2009), Polish painter, born in the village
