= Wielgoszcz, Pomeranian Voivodeship =

Wielgoszcz
- Settlement
- Location within Poland
- Coordinates: 53°16′32″N 15°34′22″E
- Country: Poland
- Voivodeship: Pomeranian
- County: Bytów
- Gmina: Lipnica

Wielgoszcz [ˈvjɛlɡɔʂt͡ʂ] is a settlement in the administrative district of Gmina Lipnica, within Bytów County, Pomeranian Voivodeship, in northern Poland.

For details of the history of the region, see History of Pomerania.
