= Karcz =

- Settlement
- Location within Poland
- Coordinates: 54°0′23″N 17°27′21″E
- Country: Poland
- Voivodeship: Pomeranian
- County: Bytów
- Gmina: Lipnica

Karcz [kart͡ʂ] is a settlement in the administrative district of Gmina Lipnica, within Bytów County, Pomeranian Voivodeship, in northern Poland.

For details of the history of the region, see History of Pomerania.
