= Karl Schildener =

German legal historian (1777–1843)

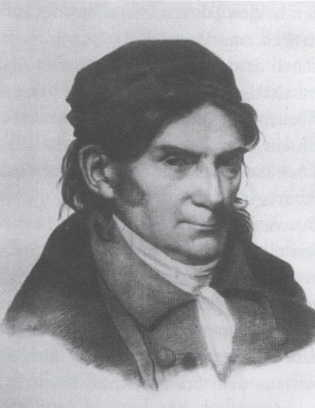
Karl Schildener

Karl Schildener (26 August 1777 – 28 December 1843) was a German lawyer, legal historian and university lecturer.

== Life and achievements ==
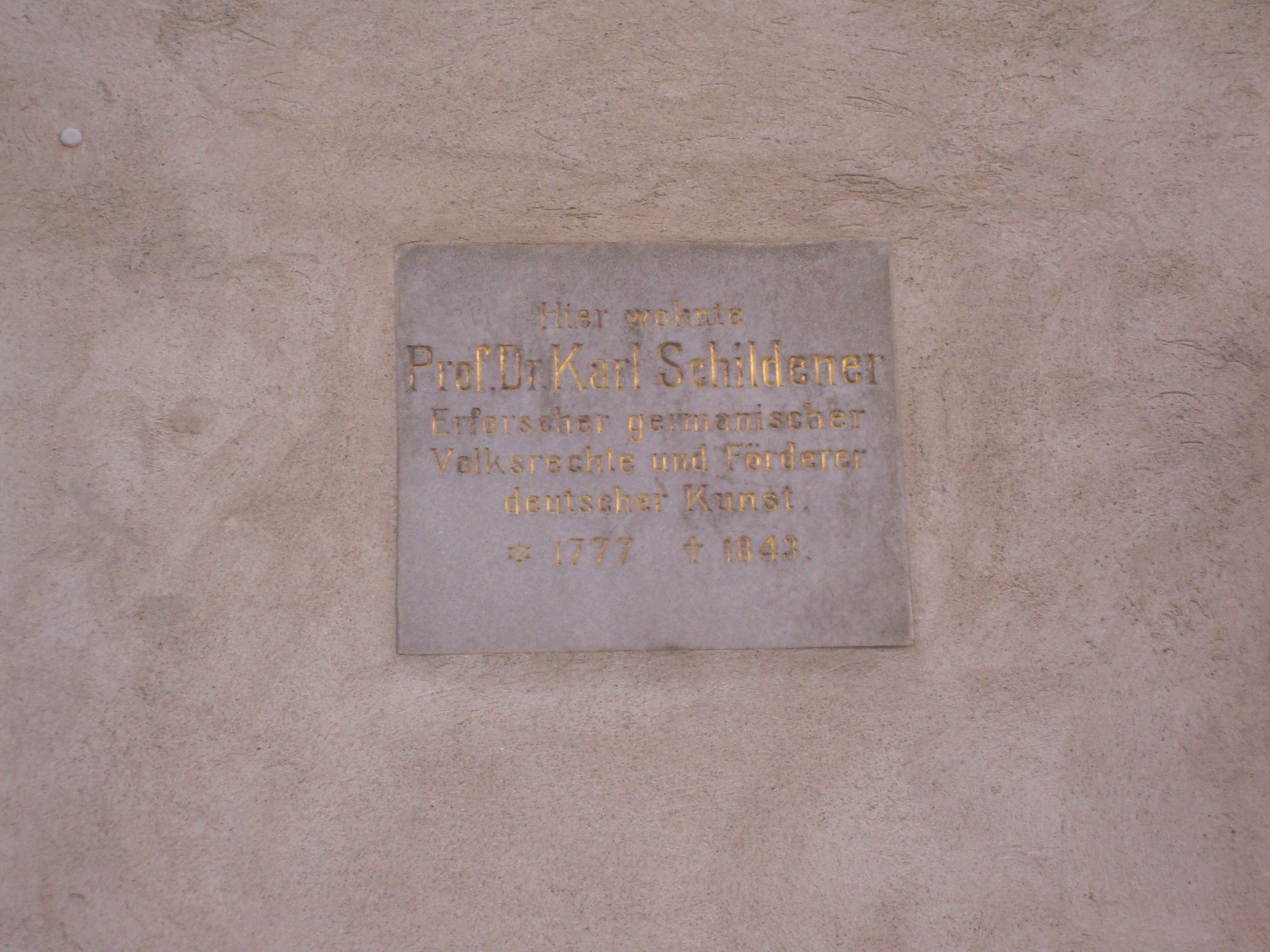
Commemorative plaque for Karl Schildener in Domstraße 10 in Greifswald

Schildener was born on 26 August 1777 in Greifswald in what was then Swedish Pomerania. His father was the council pharmacist Johann Karl Schildener (1739–1803), his mother Christina Liboria (1752–1824) a daughter of Balzer Peter Vahl, mayor of Greifswald from 1788 to 1792. Already in 1792 he was enrolled as a student of law at the University of Greifswald, from 1796 he studied at the University of Jena. There he received his doctorate in law in 1798. In 1800 he began studying Swedish law at Uppsala University. In 1802 he was appointed adjunct professor at the University of Greifswald, as teacher of Swedish Law.

In 1806 Schildener was appointed to a Swedish commission to translate Swedish legal texts into German so that they could be adopted for Swedish Pomerania. The commission, in which Schildener collaborated with Ernst Moritz Arndt, first worked in Lund and then in Stockholm until 1807. The main translation "The Swedish Reich's Law, Approved and Adopted at the Reichstag in 1734" was published in 1807 in Stockholm, but was no longer put into effect in Pomerania. When the work was completed, Swedish Pomerania was occupied by France, so that Schildener could not return to Greifswald until 1809.

In 1810 Schildener became associate professor and in 1814 full professor at the University of Greifswald, later also rector of the university. In 1818 he published for the first time in Germany the Swedish folk law of the island Gotland.

Since the 1820s his health has deteriorated. On 28 December 1843 he died in Greifswald at age 66.

== Family ==
From 1803 Schildener was married to Ingeborg Juliane Elisabeth Muhrbeck (1784–1824), a daughter of the philosophy professor Johann Christoph Muhrbeck. The two had twelve children, among them were:

- Juliana Karolina Schildener (born 1806), married to Georg Friedrich Schömann, classical philologist in Greifswald
- Peter Christian Hermann Schildener (1817–1860), professor of philosophy in Greifswald.

== Publications ==
- Ueber die schwedische Verfassung bei Gelegenheit der letzten Regierungsreform vom 6. Juni 1809. 1811.
- Guta-Lagh. Das ist: Der Insel Gothland altes Rechtsbuch. In der Ursprache und einer wiederaufgefundenen altdeutschen Übersetzung herausgegeben. Mit einer neudeutschen Übersetzung nebst Anmerkungen versehen. Ernst Mauritius, Greifswald 1818 (E-Kopie).
