= Gliśno Wielkie =

- Village
- Location within Poland
- Coordinates: 54°04′11″N 17°21′29″E
- Country: Poland
- Voivodeship: Pomeranian
- County: Bytów
- Gmina: Lipnica
- Population: 179

Gliśno Wielkie [ˈɡliɕnɔ ˈvjɛlkʲɛ] is a village in Gmina Lipnica, Bytów County, Pomeranian Voivodeship, in northern Poland.

From 1975 to 1998 the village was in Słupsk Voivodeship.
