= Stoltmany =

- Village
- Location within Poland
- Coordinates: 54°0′10″N 17°31′33″E
- Country: Poland
- Voivodeship: Pomeranian
- County: Bytów
- Gmina: Lipnica
- Population: 55

Stoltmany [stɔltˈmanɨ] is a village in the administrative district of Gmina Lipnica, within Bytów County, Pomeranian Voivodeship, in northern Poland.

For details of the history of the region, see History of Pomerania.
