= Wojsk =

- Village
- Location within Poland
- Coordinates: 54°3′20″N 17°26′8″E
- Country: Poland
- Voivodeship: Pomeranian
- County: Bytów
- Gmina: Lipnica
- Population: 173

Wojsk [vɔi̯sk] is a village in Gmina Lipnica, Bytów County, Pomeranian Voivodeship, in northern Poland.

From 1975 to 1998 the village was in Słupsk Voivodeship.

== Transport ==
Wojsk lies along the voivodeship road.
