= Rucowe Lasy =

- Village
- Location within Poland
- Coordinates: 53°57′9″N 17°22′18″E
- Country: Poland
- Voivodeship: Pomeranian
- County: Bytów
- Gmina: Lipnica
- Population: 108

Rucowe Lasy [ruˈt͡sɔvɛ ˈlasɨ] is a village in the administrative district of Gmina Lipnica, within Bytów County, Pomeranian Voivodeship, in northern Poland.

For details of the history of the region, see History of Pomerania.
