= Biedolewo =

- Settlement
- Location within Poland
- Coordinates: 54°2′17″N 17°22′50″E
- Country: Poland
- Voivodeship: Pomeranian
- County: Bytów
- Gmina: Lipnica

Biedolewo [bjɛdɔˈlɛvɔ] is a settlement in the administrative district of Gmina Lipnica, within Bytów County, Pomeranian Voivodeship, in northern Poland.
