= Lipnica, Pomeranian Voivodeship =

Lipnica
- Village
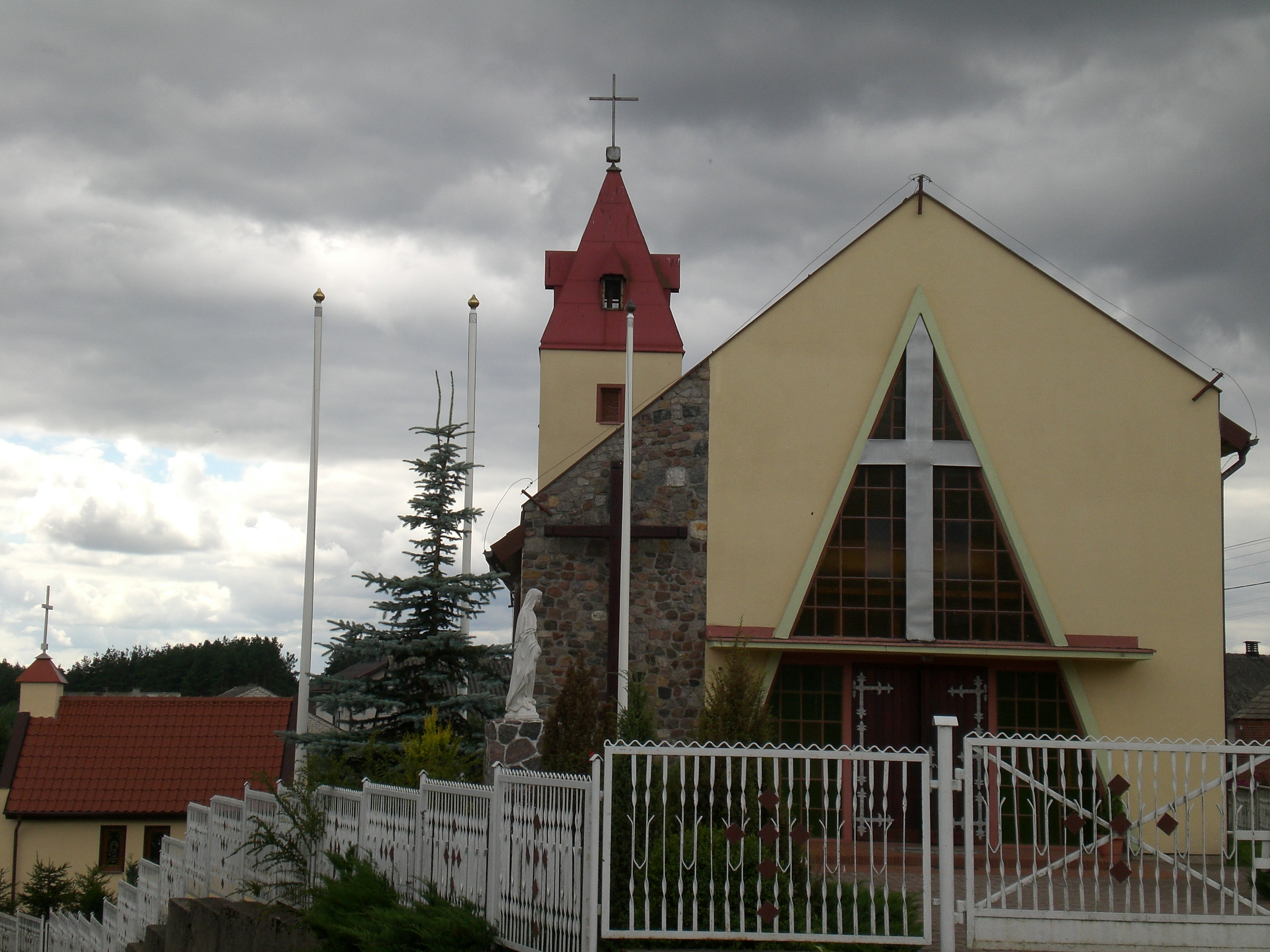
- Church in Lipnica

- Location within Poland
- Coordinates: 53°59′46″N 17°24′24″E
- Country: Poland
- Voivodeship: Pomeranian
- County: Bytów
- Gmina: Lipnica

Population
  - Total: 747
- Time zone: UTC+1 (CET)
  - Summer (DST): UTC+2 (CEST)
- Vehicle registration: GBY

Lipnica (Polish pronunciation: [lipˈɲit͡sa]) is a village in Gmina Lipnica, Bytów County, Pomeranian Voivodeship, in northern Poland. Lipnica is the seat of the Gmina Lipnica. It is located in the region of Gochy in Kashubia in Pomerania.

== History ==
Lipnica was a private village of Polish nobility, administratively located in the Człuchów County in the Pomeranian Voivodeship of the Kingdom of Poland.

From 1975 to 1998 the village was in Słupsk Voivodeship.

== Transport ==
Lipnica lies on voivodeship road 212.
