= Modziel =

- Village
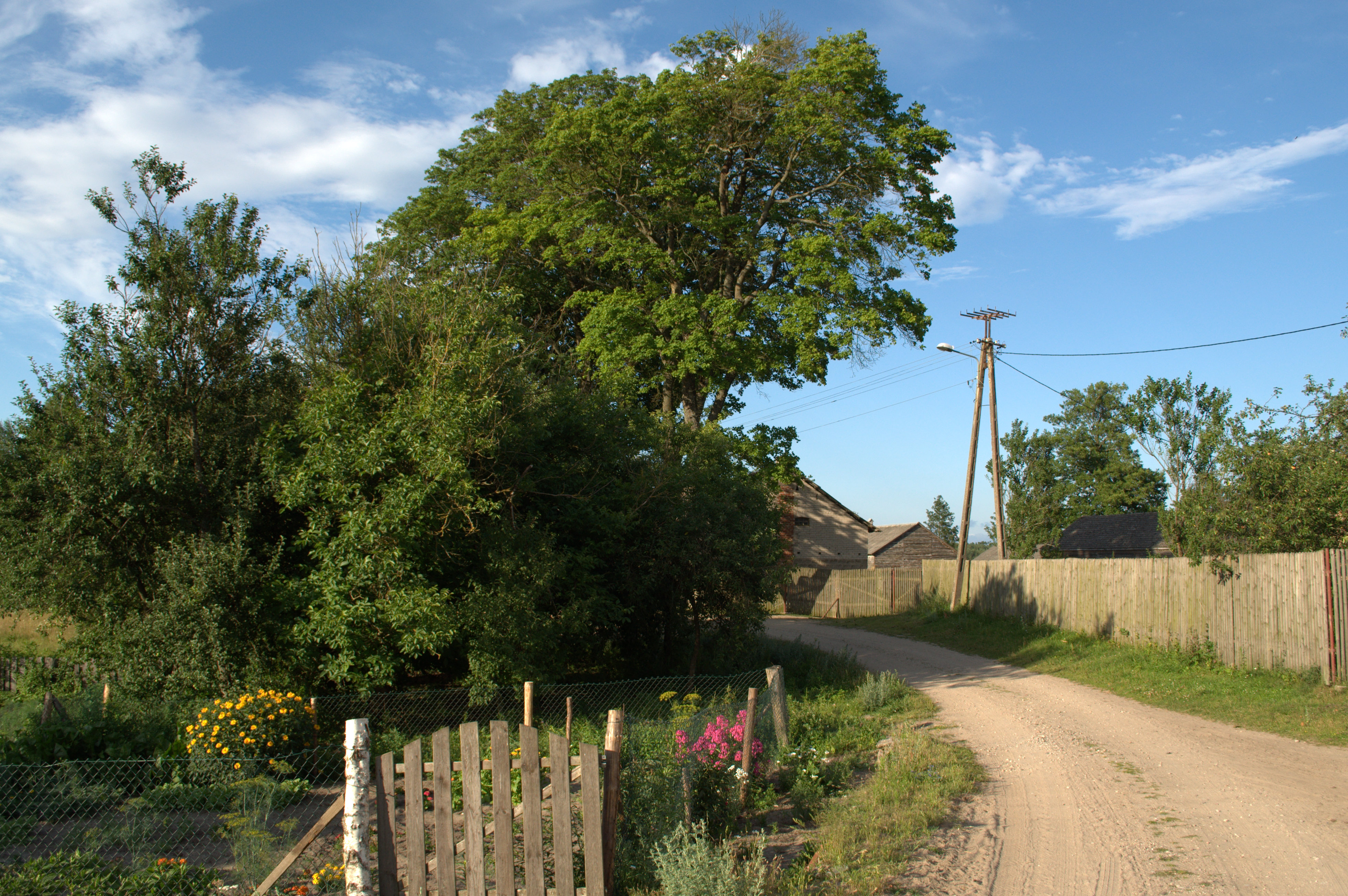

- Location within Poland
- Coordinates: 53°55′57″N 17°27′38″E
- Country: Poland
- Voivodeship: Pomeranian
- County: Bytów
- Gmina: Lipnica
- Population: 19

Modziel [ˈmɔd͡ʑɛl] is a village in the administrative district of Gmina Lipnica, within Bytów County, Pomeranian Voivodeship, in northern Poland.

For details of the history of the region, see History of Pomerania.
