= Trzebielsk =

- Settlement
- Location within Poland
- Coordinates: 53°59′51″N 17°22′29″E
- Country: Poland
- Voivodeship: Pomeranian
- County: Bytów
- Gmina: Lipnica
- Population: 21

Trzebielsk [ˈtʂɛbjɛlsk] is a settlement in the administrative district of Gmina Lipnica, within Bytów County, Pomeranian Voivodeship, in northern Poland.

For details of the history of the region, see History of Pomerania.
