= Nowa Osusznica =

- Settlement
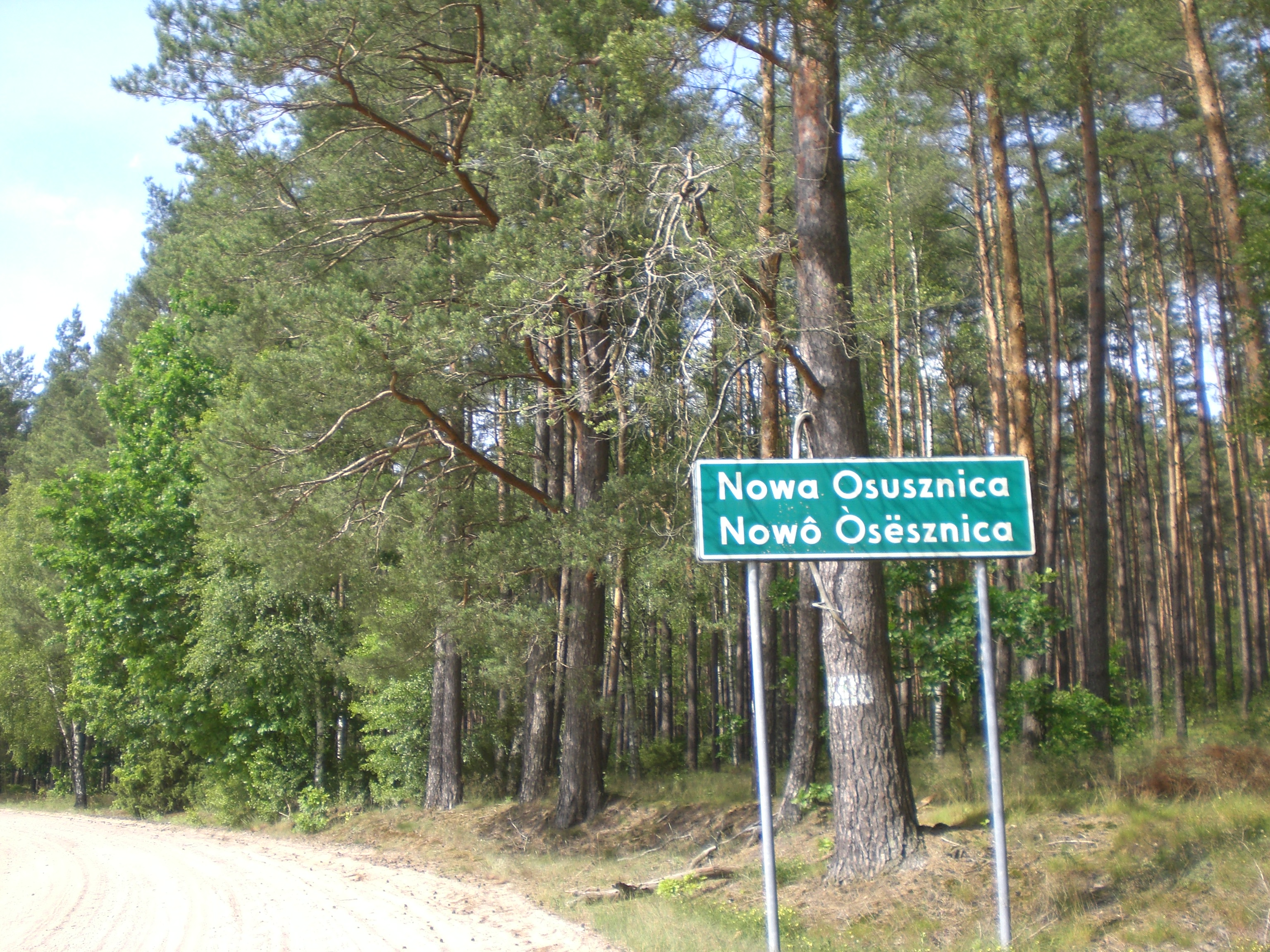

- Location within Poland
- Coordinates: 53°56′58″N 17°23′45″E
- Country: Poland
- Voivodeship: Pomeranian
- County: Bytów
- Gmina: Lipnica
- Population: 7

Nowa Osusznica [ˈnɔva ɔsuʂˈnit͡sa] is a settlement in the administrative district of Gmina Lipnica, within Bytów County, Pomeranian Voivodeship, in northern Poland.

For details of the history of the region, see History of Pomerania.
