= Alfred Roloff =

German illustrator and painter (1879–1951)

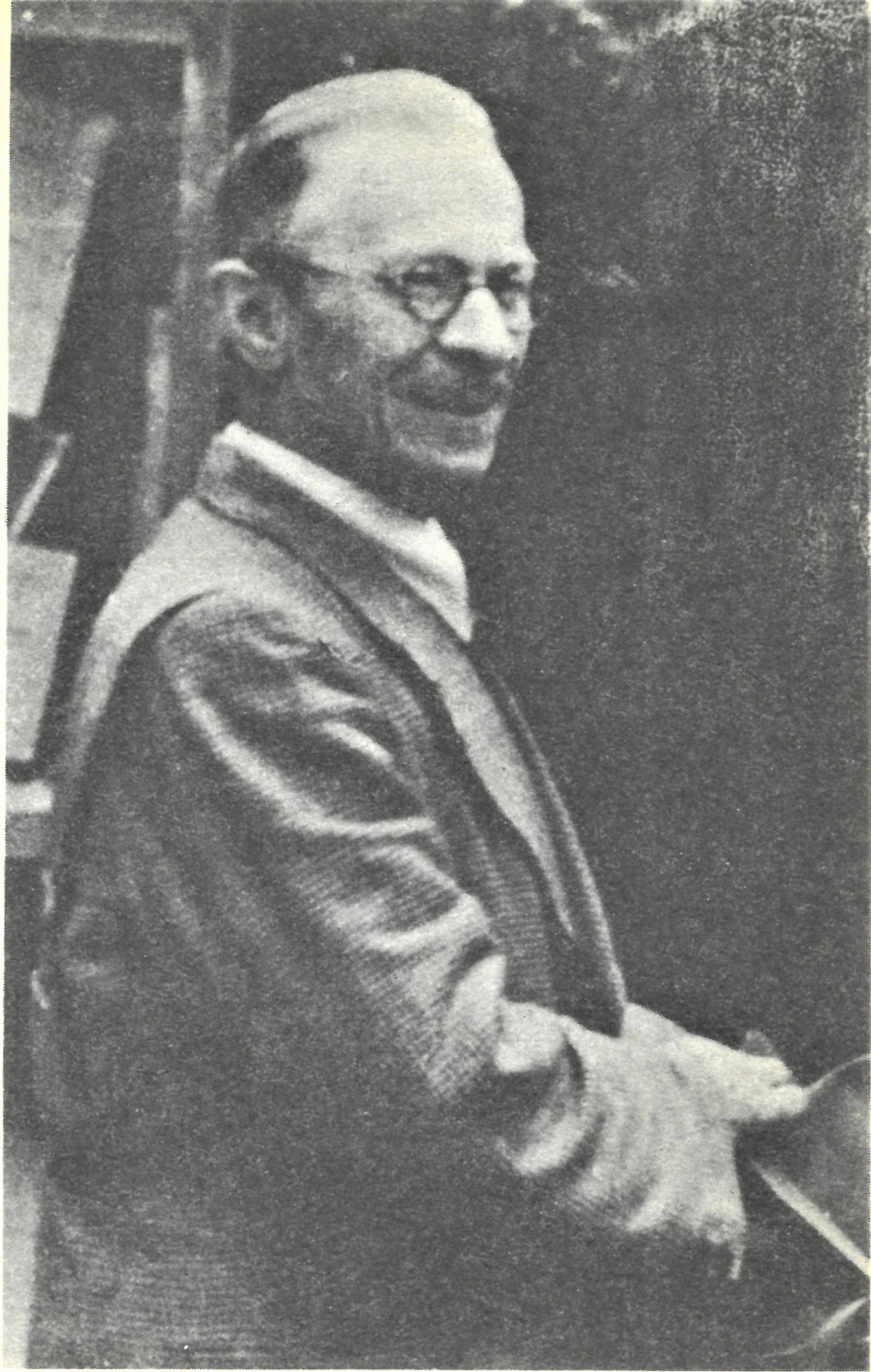
Alfred Roloff (date unknown)

Alfred Gustav Christian Roloff (19 March 1879, Lassan - 7 December 1951, Rade bei Rendsburg) was a German artist and illustrator; best known for his dime novel covers and paintings of horses.

== Life and work ==
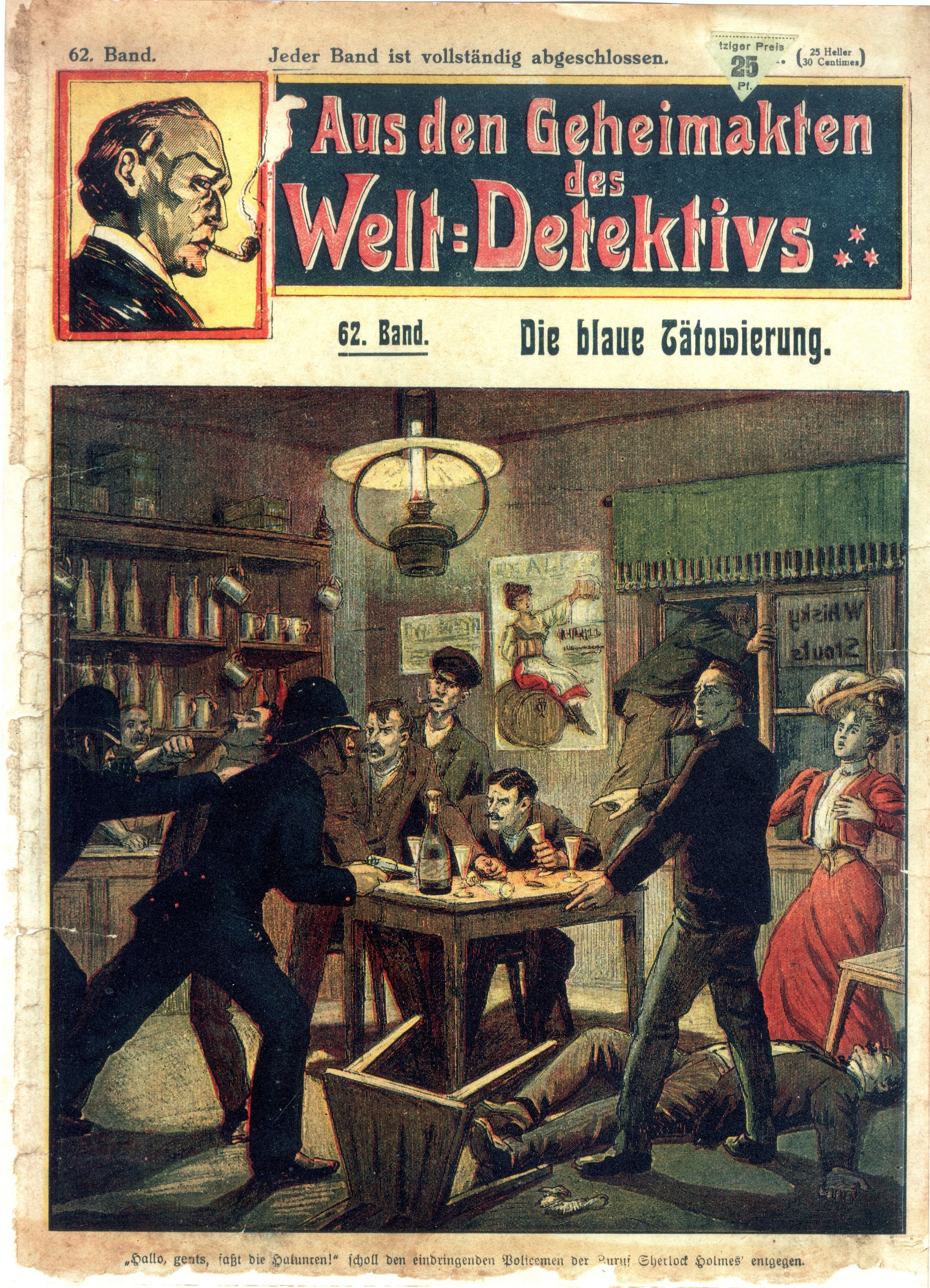
An example of his cover art

He was born to Wilhelm Roloff (1850–1936), a naval officer, and his wife Caroline née Sadewasser (1855–1924). His younger brother, Otto (1882–1972), also became a painter and art professor. In 1886, the family moved to Hamburg. From 1896 to 1901, he attended the Academy of Arts, Berlin.

Upon graduating, he went to work as an illustrator for the publishers, Verlagshaus für Volksliteratur und Kunst, also in Berlin. They were a very prolific organization, flooding the European market with light entertainment and quickly produced works of fiction, known as "dime novels". Other publishers soon noticed his talent. In 1905, he took part in a competition for advertising designs, jointly sponsored by Henkell & Co. Sektkellerei and Stollwerck. His design was recommended for purchase by the judges, for the sum of 200 Marks. His success brought him further employment; designing book covers that were reproduced by the millions. In 1908, he was able to marry his fiancée, Auguste Schröder.

He was also an animal painter, primarily of horses, in dynamic scenes, featuring them in motion; often running from some danger. During World War I, he produced battle scenes with horses. These put his name before the general public, more than his covers, and what he is best remembered for today.

During the Nazi dictatorship, he was a member of the Reichskammer der bildenden Künste (Chamber of Fine Arts) and was able to continue working. From 1940 to 1944, he was represented at the Große Deutsche Kunstausstellung in the Haus der Kunst in Munich. For many years, his painting Flüchtende Pferde (Fleeing Horses), hung in Hitler's office at the Neue Reichskanzlei. Alfred Rosenberg was an admirer of his painting, Fohlenzwillinge (Foal Twins)“.

At the height of his recognition, in 1942, he had an affair with Elisabeth von Trotta, from Courland. Their union produced a daughter, the filmmaker and author, Margarethe von Trotta. As the war approached Berlin, he moved to Warthegau. In 1945, he settled in Rade bei Rendsburg, where he died six years later.

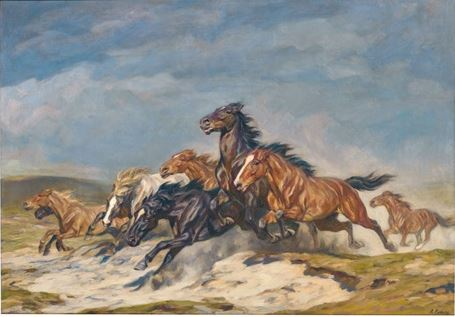
Eight Galloping Horses (one of several variations on "Fleeing Horses")
