= Johann Christoph Muhrbeck =

Johann Christoph Muhrbeck (7 January 1733 – 15 January 1805) was a Swedish Pomeranian philosopher.

== Early life and education ==
Born in Lund, the son of the theologian Lorenz Murbeck, superintendent in Karlskrona, Muhrbeck was first taught by a tutor and then attended school in Karlskrona. He later studied at the universities of Lund and Greifswald. After his return to Sweden he became a teacher at the cadet institute in Karlskrona.

== Career ==
In 1760 he was adjunct professor at the Faculty of Philosophy of Greifswald University and held lectures in philosophy and mathematics in this function. In 1767 he was appointed full professor of practical philosophy. After Peter Ahlwardt's death (1792), he also took over the theoretical philosophy. In the years 1778, 1793 and 1803 he was rector of the university.

Muhrbeck, who published numerous philosophical writings, was a staunch supporter of Christian Wolff and a staunch opponent of Immanuel Kant. His son Friedrich Philipp Albert Muhrbeck later also taught philosophy in Greifswald, but was a follower of Kant and Johann Gottlieb Fichte. The daughter Ingeborg Juliane Elisabeth Muhrbeck (1784-1824) married the lawyer and historian Karl Schildener in 1803.

Muhrbeck died in Greifswald at age 72.
