= Brzeźno Szlacheckie =

- Village
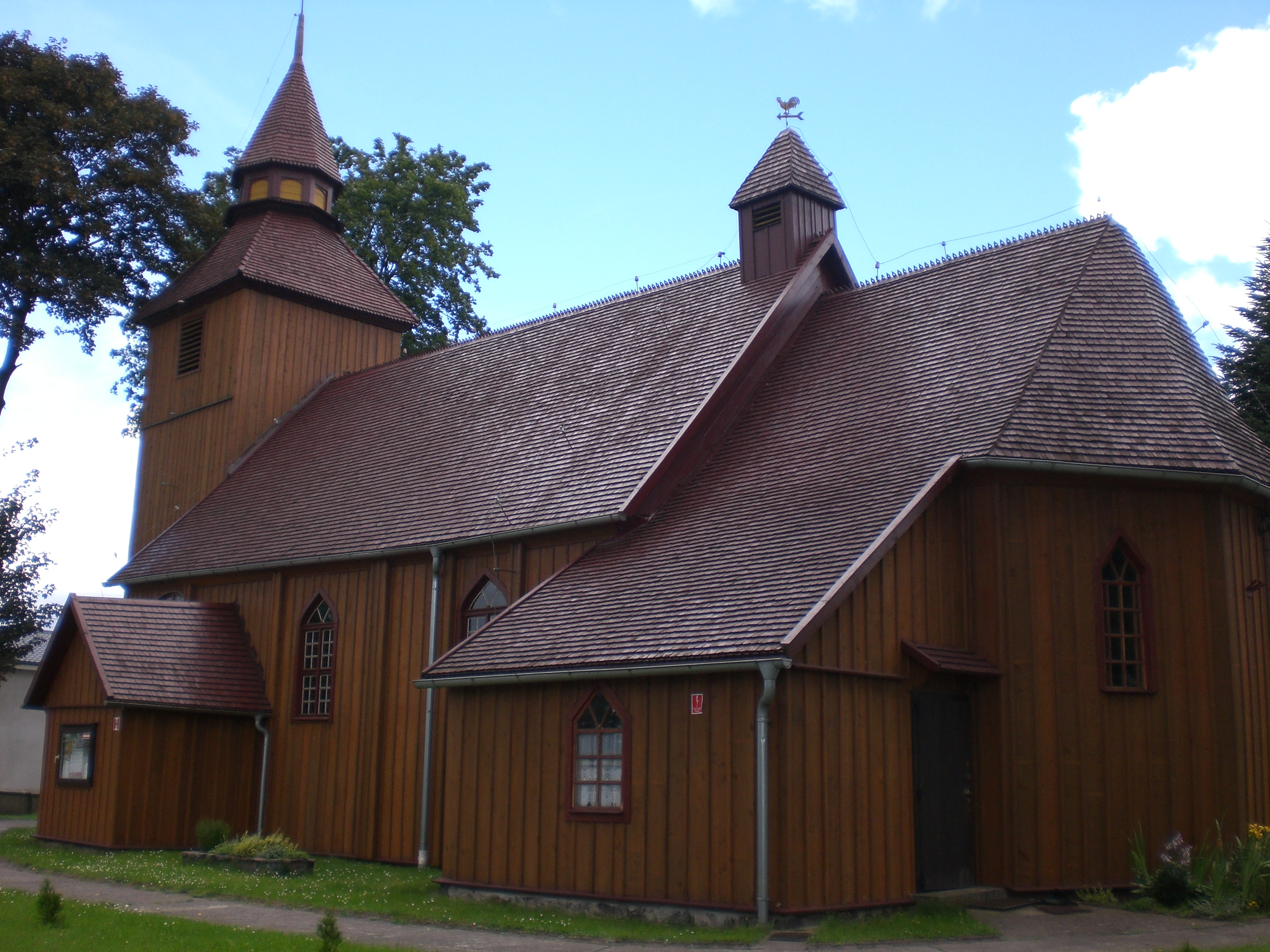
- Saint Catherine church in Brzeźno Szlacheckie

- Location within Poland
- Coordinates: 54°01′06″N 17°14′41″E
- Country: Poland
- Voivodeship: Pomeranian
- County: Bytów
- Gmina: Lipnica
- Elevation: 200 m (660 ft)

Population
  - Total: 505
- Time zone: UTC+1 (CET)
  - Summer (DST): UTC+2 (CEST)
- Vehicle registration: GBY

Brzeźno Szlacheckie [ˈbʐɛʑnɔ ʂlaˈxɛt͡skʲɛ] (Kashubian: Brzézno Szlachecczé) is a village in Gmina Lipnica, Bytów County, Pomeranian Voivodeship, in northern Poland. It is located in the region of Gochy in Kashubia in Pomerania.

== History ==
Brzeźno Szlacheckie was a private village of Polish nobility, including the Prądzyński, Lipiński, Borzyszkowski and Brzeziński families, administratively located in the Człuchów County in the Pomeranian Voivodeship of the Kingdom of Poland.

From 1975 to 1998 the village was in Słupsk Voivodeship.
