= Pulow =

- Ortsteil of Lassan
- Interactive map of Pulow
- Location within Germany Location within Mecklenburg-Vorpommern
- Coordinates: 53°57′N 13°48′E
- Country: Germany
- State: Mecklenburg-Vorpommern
- District: Vorpommern-Greifswald
- Town: Lassan
- Subdivisions: 4

Area
  - Total: 15.38 km^{2} (5.94 sq mi)
- Elevation: 24 m (79 ft)

Population (2006-12-31)
  - Total: 320
  - Density: 21/km^{2} (54/sq mi)
- Time zone: UTC+01:00 (CET)
  - Summer (DST): UTC+02:00 (CEST)
- Postal codes: 17440
- Dialling codes: 03 8 374
- Vehicle registration: OVP
- Website: www.amt-am-peenestrom.de

Pulow is a village and a former municipality in the Vorpommern-Greifswald district, in Mecklenburg-Vorpommern, Germany. Since 7 June 2009, it is part of the town Lassan.
