= Western Pomerania (disambiguation) =

Western Pomerania is an area on the Baltic coast of Poland and Germany.

Western Pomerania may also refer to:

- Duchy of Pomerania, ruled intermittently by the House of Griffin 1121–1637
- Swedish Pomerania, a dominion under the Swedish Crown from 1630 to 1815
- Province of Pomerania (1815–1945), a Prussian province
- West Pomeranian Voivodeship, a modern Polish province
- Mecklenburg-Vorpommern, a modern German state

== See also ==
- Pomerania
- Eastern Pomerania (disambiguation)
- West Pomeranian dialect
