= Borowy Młyn, Bytów County =

Borowy Młyn
- Village
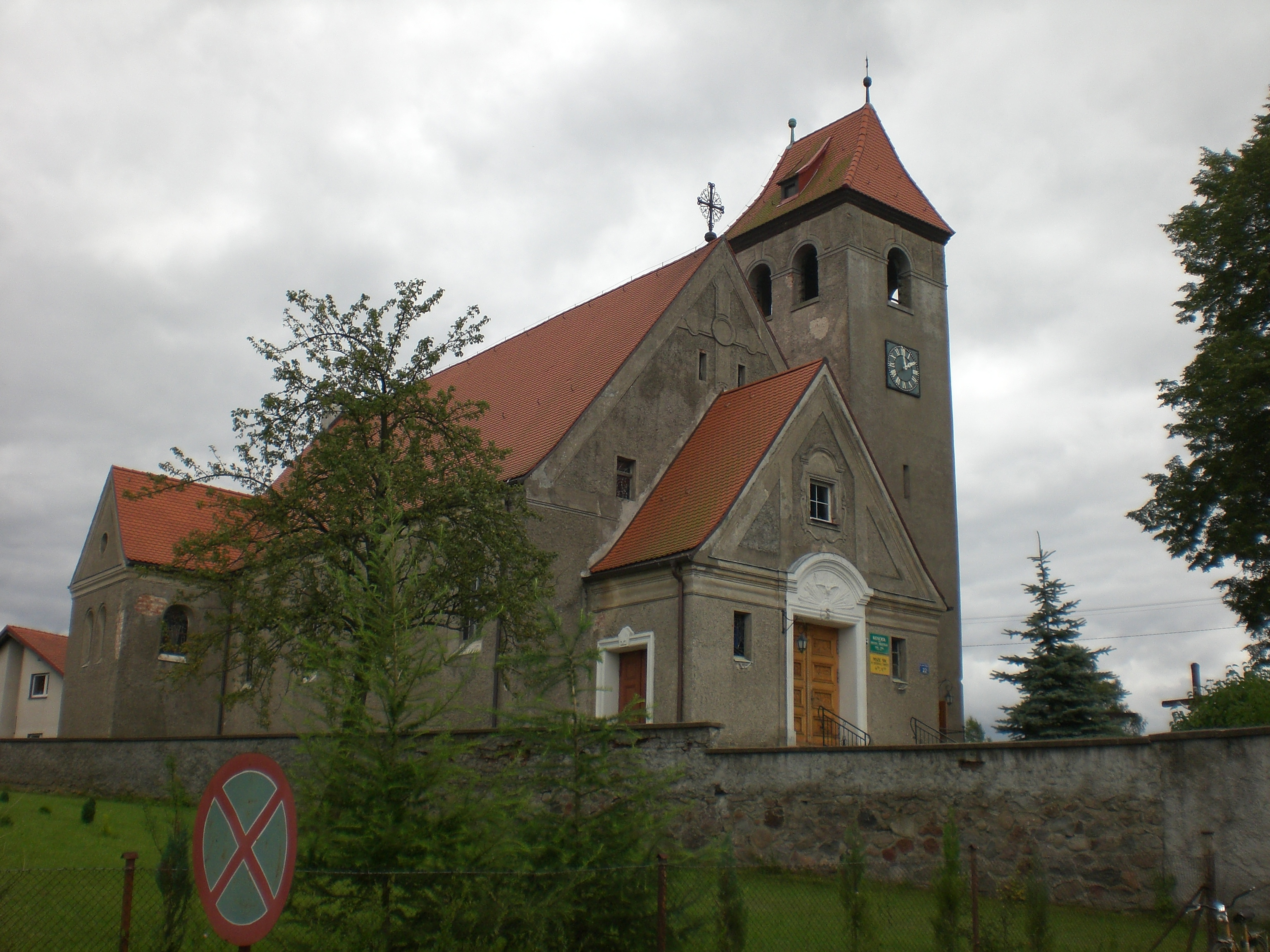
- Holy Spirit church in Borowy Młyn

- Location within Poland
- Coordinates: 53°57′56″N 17°18′53″E
- Country: Poland
- Voivodeship: Pomeranian
- County: Bytów
- Gmina: Lipnica
- Population: 621
- Time zone: UTC+1 (CET)
  - Summer (DST): UTC+2 (CEST)
- Vehicle registration: GBY

Borowy Młyn [bɔˈrɔvɨ ˈmwɨn] is a village in Gmina Lipnica, Bytów County, Pomeranian Voivodeship, in northern Poland. It is located within the ethnocultural region of Kashubia in the historic region of Pomerania.

== History ==
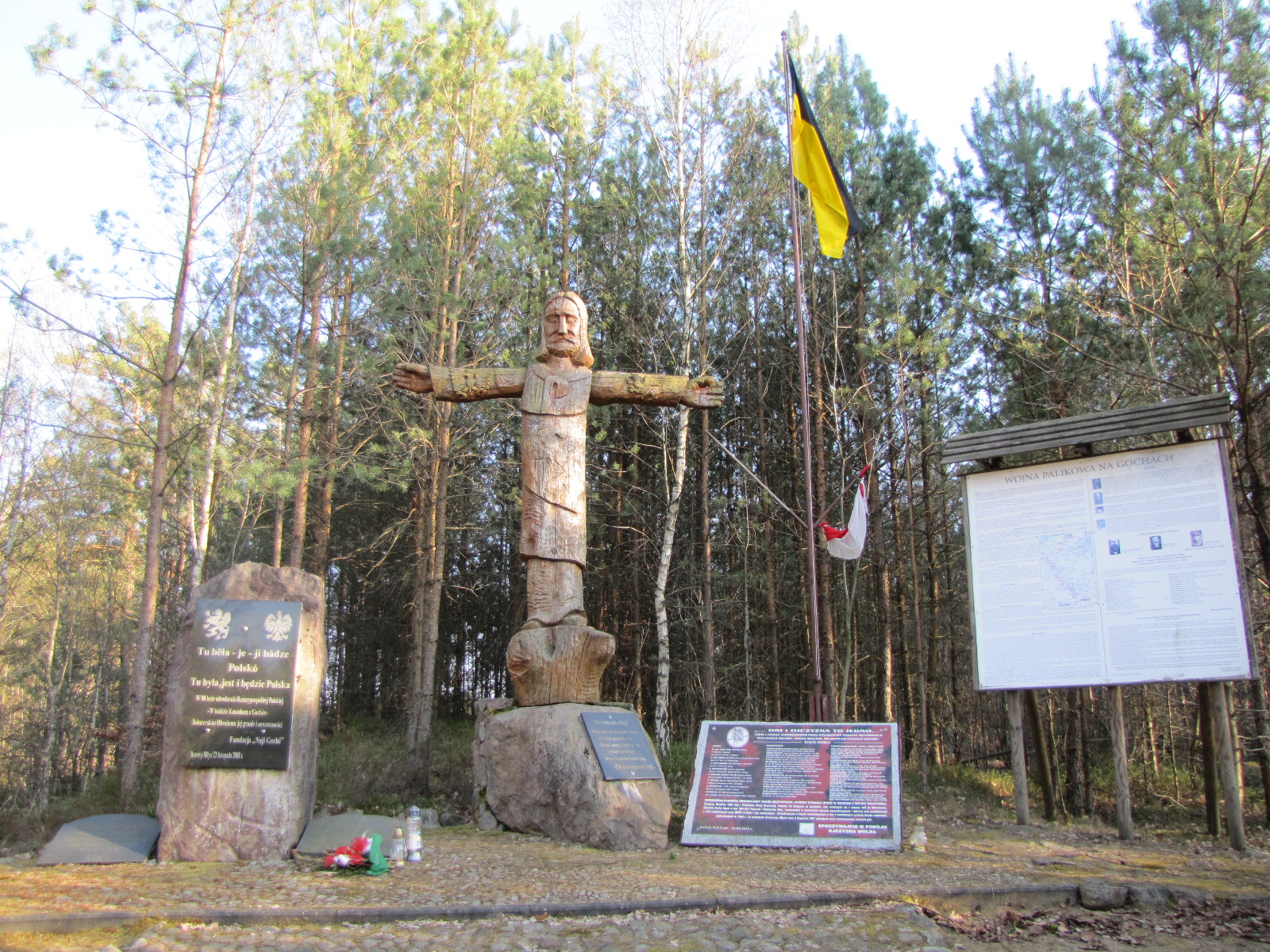
Monument to local fighters for Polish independence

Borowy Młyn was a royal village of the Polish Crown, administratively located in the Człuchów County in the Pomeranian Voivodeship.

During the German occupation of Poland (World War II), several inhabitants of the village were among over 450 Poles massacred by the Germans in the Igielska Valley near Chojnice in October and November 1939 (see Intelligenzaktion).

From 1975 to 1998 the village was in Słupsk Voivodeship.
