= Prądzona =

- Village
- Location within Poland
- Coordinates: 54°0′10″N 17°19′57″E
- Country: Poland
- Voivodeship: Pomeranian
- County: Bytów
- Gmina: Lipnica
- Population (2006): 159

Prądzona [prɔnˈd͡zɔna] is a village in Gmina Lipnica, Bytów County, Pomeranian Voivodeship, in northern Poland.

From 1975 to 1998 the village was in Słupsk Voivodeship.
