= Balzer Peter Vahl =

Balzer Peter Vahl (28 August 1718 in Lassan – 1792) was burgomaster of Greifswald. He founded the Greifswald merchant family Wahl.

He became a merchant on 18 April 1744 in the first estate citizens of Greifswald. The merchant belongs from 1747 to the fifty men and from 1751 to the Achtmänner of the city. In 1755 he became member of the town council and from 1762 the city's treasurer. From 1785 he was the third mayor and held this office until his death in 1792. He supervised the deconstruction decided by the city council in 1782 and the transformation of parts of the Greifswalder Stadtbefestigung into a green area (Wallpromenade).

He was married to Christine Elisabeth Venthien (1723–1782). Beside several daughters, das Ehepaar had two sons: Gottfried Michael (1748–1811) and Balzer Peter.
