= Borzyszkowy =

- Village
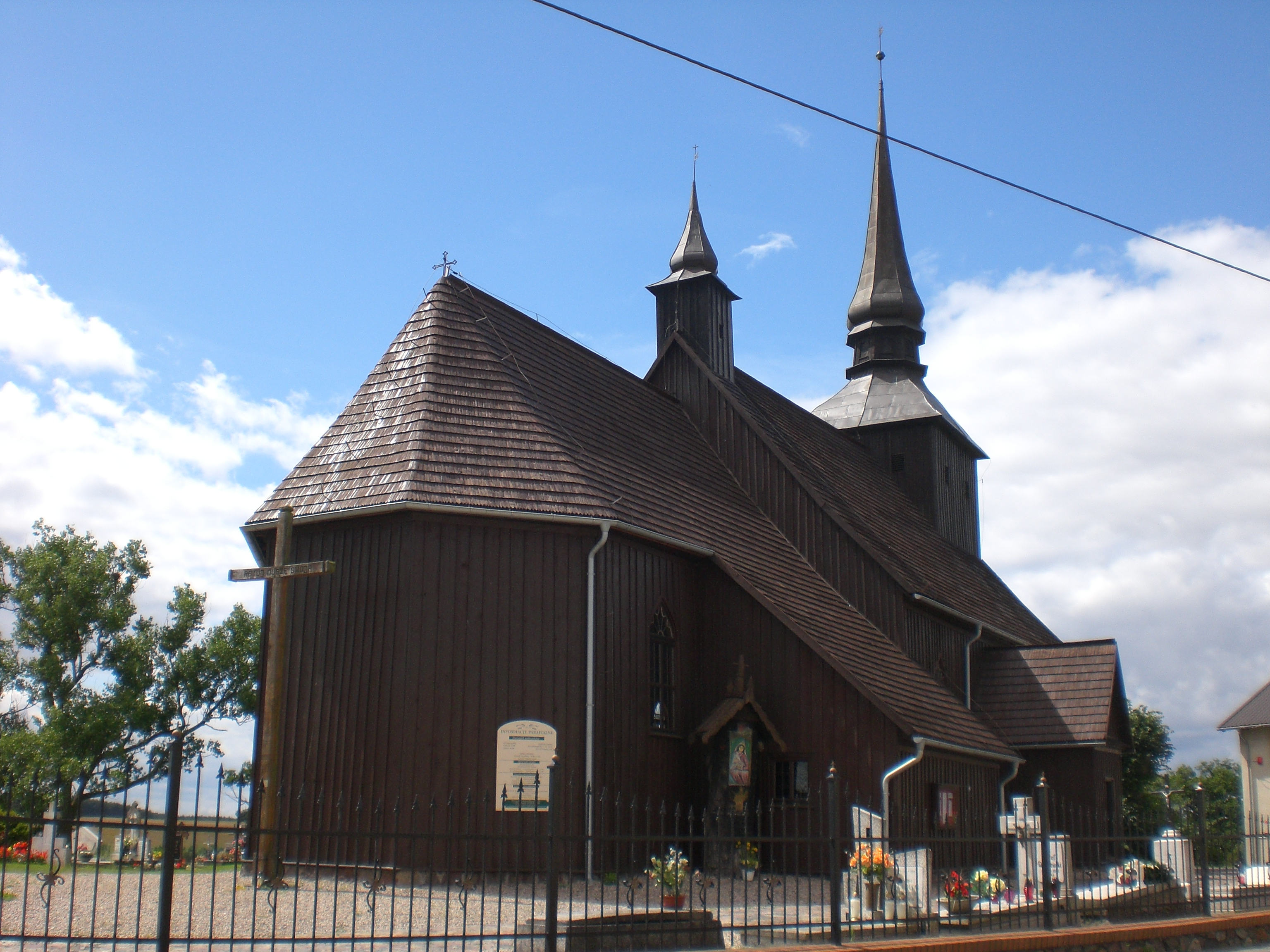
- Saint Martin church in Borzyszkowy

- Location within Poland
- Coordinates: 54°01′56″N 17°22′30″E
- Country: Poland
- Voivodeship: Pomeranian
- County: Bytów
- Gmina: Lipnica
- Elevation: 160 m (520 ft)
- Population: 243
- Time zone: UTC+1 (CET)
  - Summer (DST): UTC+2 (CEST)
- Vehicle registration: GBY

Borzyszkowy [bɔʐɨʂˈkɔvɨ] (Cashubian Bòrzëszkòwë,) is a village in Gmina Lipnica, Bytów County, Pomeranian Voivodeship, in northern Poland. It is located within the ethnocultural region of Kashubia in the historic region of Pomerania.

From 1975 to 1998 the village was in Słupsk Voivodeship.

Borzyszkowy was a royal village of the Polish Crown, administratively located in the Człuchów County in the Pomeranian Voivodeship.
