= Lassan, Germany =

Town in Mecklenburg-Vorpommern, Germany

Lassan
- Town
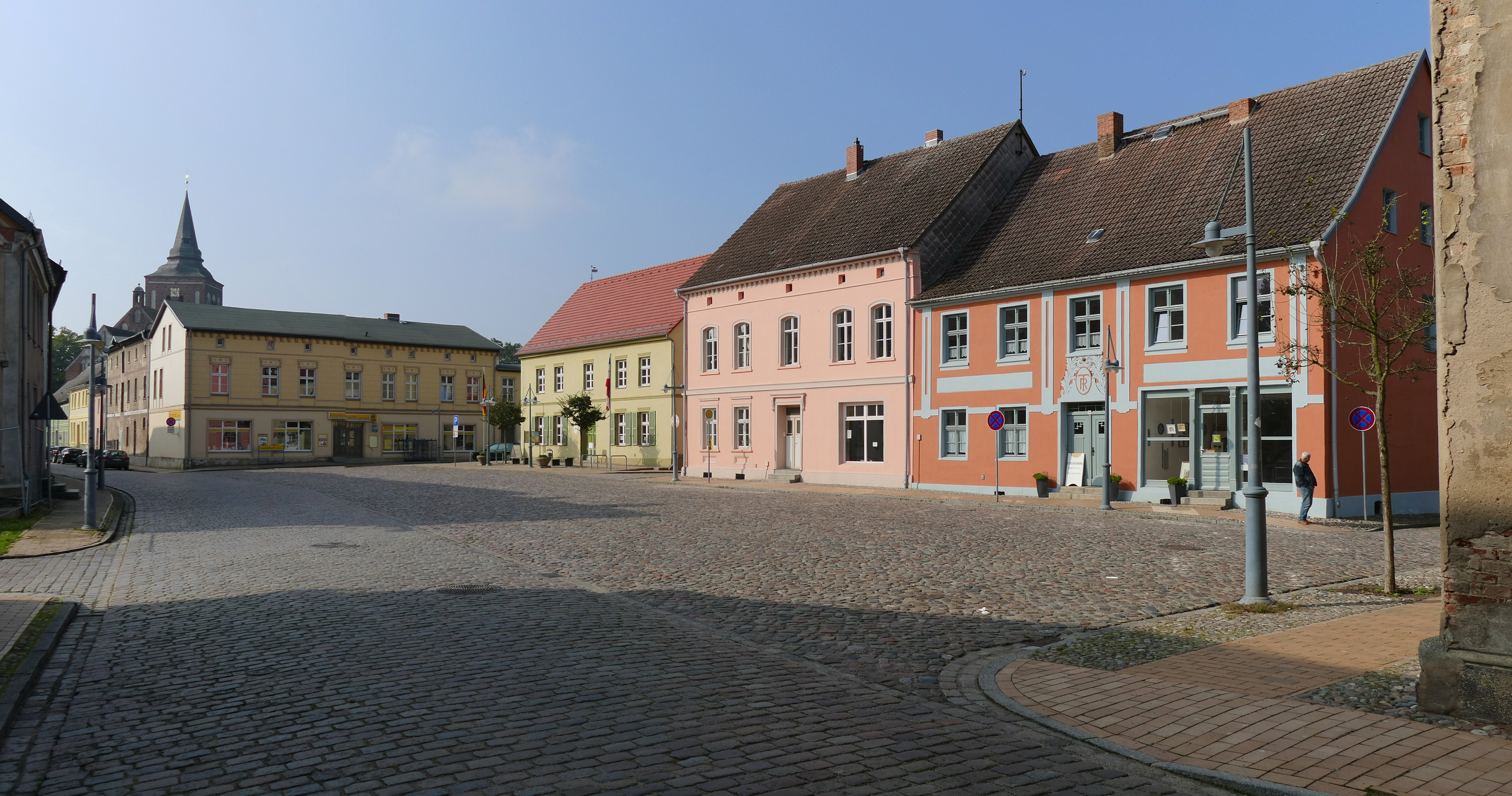
- Lassan Marketplace

- Coat of arms

- Location of Lassan within Vorpommern-Greifswald district
- Interactive map of Lassan
- Location within Germany Location within Mecklenburg-Vorpommern
- Coordinates: 53°56′N 13°50′E
- Country: Germany
- State: Mecklenburg-Vorpommern
- District: Vorpommern-Greifswald
- Municipal assoc.: Am Peenestrom

Government
  - Mayor: Fred Gransow

Area
  - Total: 28.21 km^{2} (10.89 sq mi)
- Elevation: 5 m (16 ft)

Population (2025-12-31)
  - Total: 1,226
  - Density: 43.46/km^{2} (112.6/sq mi)
- Time zone: UTC+01:00 (CET)
  - Summer (DST): UTC+02:00 (CEST)
- Postal codes: 17440
- Dialling codes: 038374
- Vehicle registration: VG
- Website: www.lassan.de

Lassan (German pronunciation: [laˈsan]) is a town in the Vorpommern-Greifswald district, in Mecklenburg-Western Pomerania, Germany.

== Etymology ==
The name possibly derives from an Old Polabian word, Lěšane, meaning "forest dweller" or "forest dwelling".

== Location ==
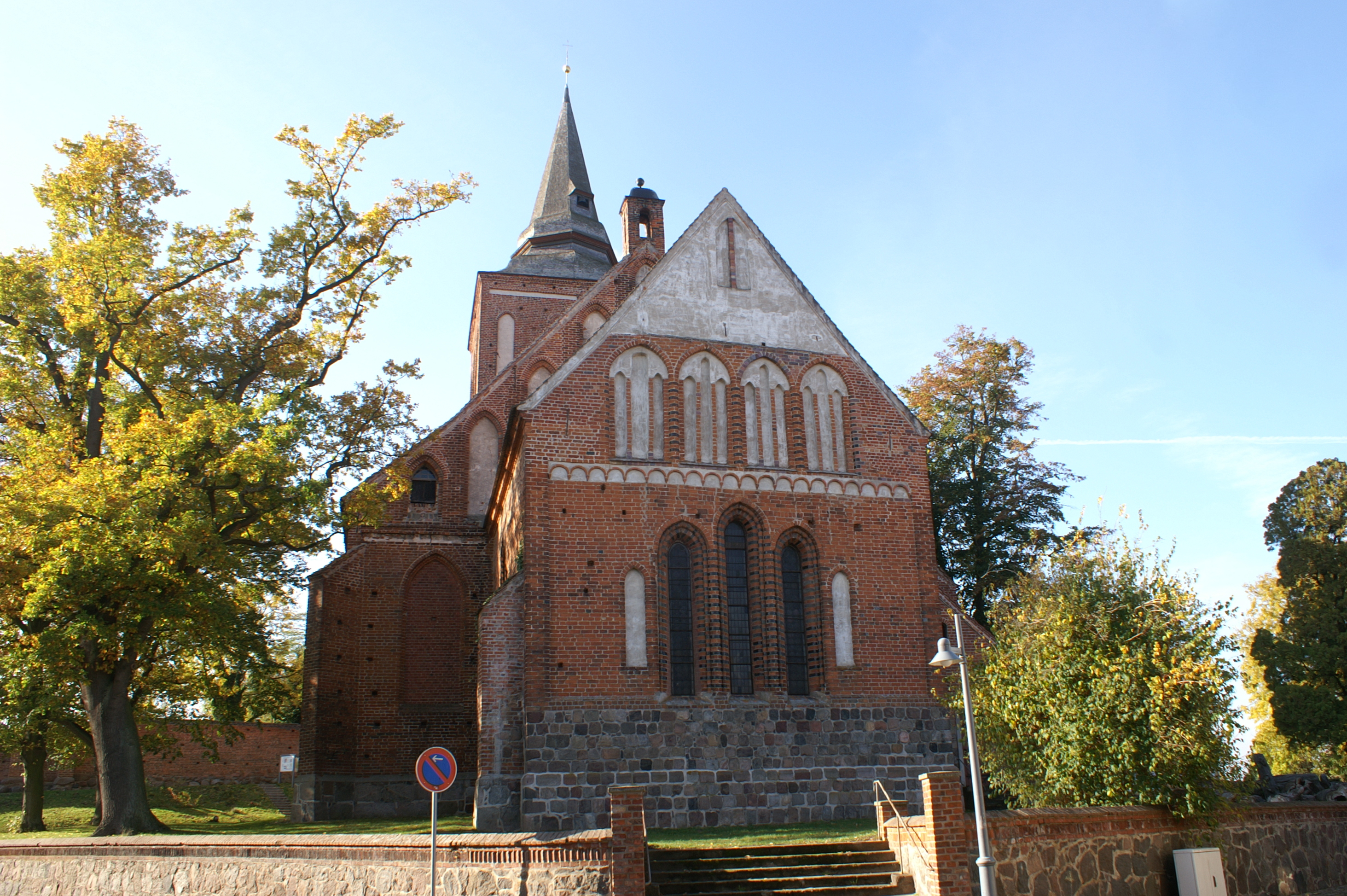
The medieval town church

The town is situated on the Peenestrom river, a branch of the Oder, between the larger towns of Anklam and Wolgast. Both Anklam in the southwest and Wolgast in the north are approximately 15 kilometres (9.3 mi) from Lassan. Part of the municipality are also the villages of Pulow, Papendorf, Klein Jasedow and Waschow.

Lassan has a small marina for sailboats and yachts. There is also a campsite for visitors in the town. A museum dedicated to the town is housed in a former watermill in the town.

== History ==
Lassan was mentioned in written sources for the first time in 1136, when it was a German settlement with a castle. However this settlement was predated by a Polabian fishing village with a fortification. The Dukes of Pomerania regulated the layout of the town around 1200. Lassan received town privileges in 1274. The town still retains much of its medieval character, with the old street grid and the remains of a town wall. The town church, St. Johannis zu Lassan, is also medieval. Construction started around 1300 and the oldest parts are in a transitional style between Romanesque and Gothic. With its spire, it is 57 metres (187 ft) tall, 37 metres (121 ft) long and 24 metres (79 ft) broad. The church was renovated during the 1990s.

== Notable people ==
- Bernt Notke (c. 1440 – c. 1509), late Gothic artist
- Johann Joachim Spalding (1714 – 1804), Protestant theologian and philosopher, living and working as pastor in Lassan from 1749 to 1757
- Balzer Peter Vahl (1718 – 1792), merchant and mayor of Greifswald
- Theodor Bartus (1858 – 1941), sailor, museum technician, and conservator
- Alfred Roloff (1879 – 1951), painter and illustrator of dime novels
