= Lauenburg and Bütow Land =

Historical region in modern-day Poland

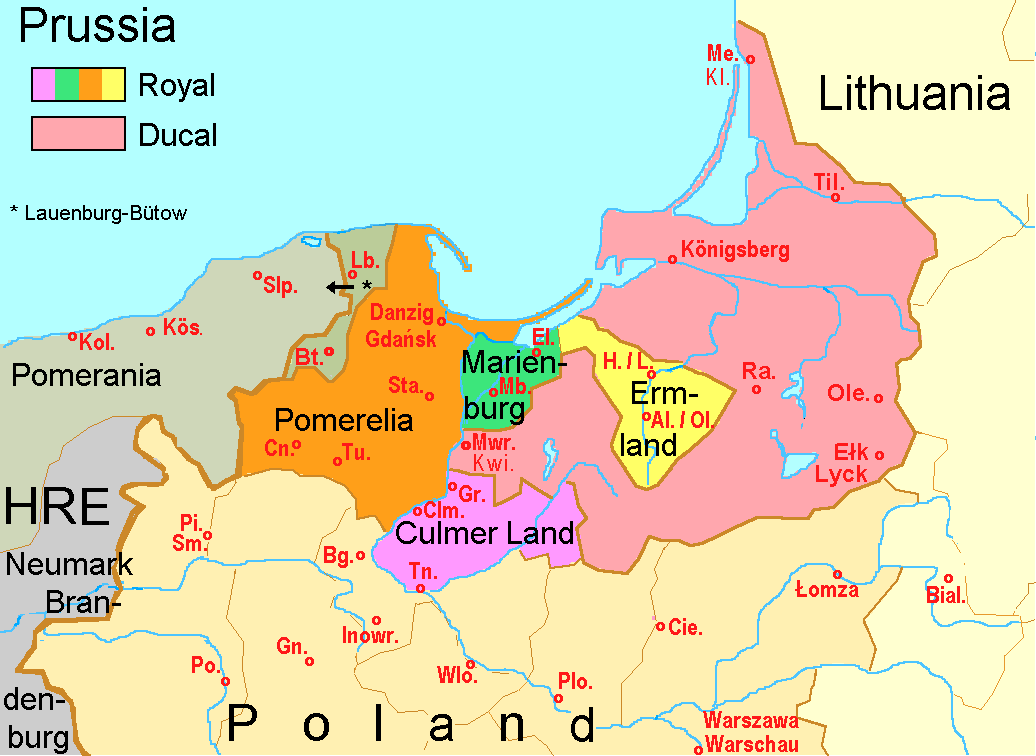
The Pomerelian districts of Lauenburg and Bütow, identified by Lb. and Bt, enfeoffed to the Dukes of Pomerania (as of 1526)

Lauenburg and Bütow Land (German: Länder or Lande Lauenburg und Bütow, Kashubian: Lãbòrskò-bëtowskô Zemia, Polish: Ziemia lęborsko-bytowska) formed a historical region in the western part of Pomerelia (Polish and papal historiography) or in the eastern part of Farther Pomerania (German historiography). It was composed of two districts centered on the towns of Lauenburg (Lębork) and Bütow (Bytów). The land is today part of the Polish Pomeranian Voivodeship.

== History ==
=== Polish Pomerelia ===
In the 12th and 13th centuries the area east of the Łeba river was on the western periphery of the Pomerelian duchies, ruled by the Samborides dynasty as vassals of the Polish Crown as distinct to the neighbouring Duchy of Pomerania, which in 1181 had become an Imperial State. After the Danish defeat at the 1227 Battle of Bornhöved, the Pomerelian duke Swietopelk II at Gdańsk acquired the adjacent Lands of Schlawe and Stolp, formerly a possession of the Pomeranian dukes, and declared himself an independent dux Pomeranorum in his enlarged territory (Pomorze Gdańskie). However, the line of the Samborides became extinct upon the death of Swietopelk's son Mestwin II in 1294, and after the Treaty of Kępno, the territory became part of Poland, under King Przemysław II. The Margraviate of Brandenburg also sought to control the area and in the following armed conflict, the Polish duke Władysław I the Elbow-high called for the support of the Teutonic Knights.

=== Seizure by the State of Teutonic Order ===
After expelling the Brandenburgians from Gdańsk, the Knights massacred the local population and took over Gdańsk and adjacent areas in 1308. Disregarding the Polish claims and subsequent papal rulings, the Order's State concluded the Treaty of Soldin with Brandenburg in the following year, where the Knights claimed all Pomerelian lands - including Lauenburg and Bütow - while the adjacent Lands of Schlawe and Stolp fell to the Ascanian margraves and were again acquired by the Duchy of Pomerania in 1316 (later Pomerania-Stolp). The Griffin dukes in 1317 also acquired the Bütow area, which was yet again sold to the Knights in 1329.

After paying off the Brandenburg margraves, the Teutonic knights integrated the Pomerelian lands into their monastic state, with the Lauenburg and Bütow Landmarking its western border with the Pomeranian duchy. The knights invited German settlers (see Ostsiedlung) and granted the towns of Lauenburg and Bütow Kulm law in 1341 and 1346 respectively. Lauenburg as well as Leba joined the 1454 uprising of the Prussian Confederation, which sparked the Thirteen Years' War between the Kingdom of Poland and the Order's State.

=== Polish fief held by dukes of Pomerania ===
In 1455 Poland promised the Lauenburg and Bütow Land to Duke Eric II of Pomerania in return for his support, yet the towns were still held by the Knights' troops. When the Order's defeat and 1466 Second Peace of Thorn ended the war, those troops were paid off and King Casimir IV Jagiellon of Poland again granted the towns to the Griffins, though it was disputed whether as his trustees or in pawn, while the rest of Pomerelia became part of Royal Prussia. The dispute was ended in 1526 when King Sigismund I the Old entrusted the area as a fief ("libere a servitio et a iuramento") to Duke Georg I of Pomerania.

=== Polish-Lithuanian Commonwealth ===
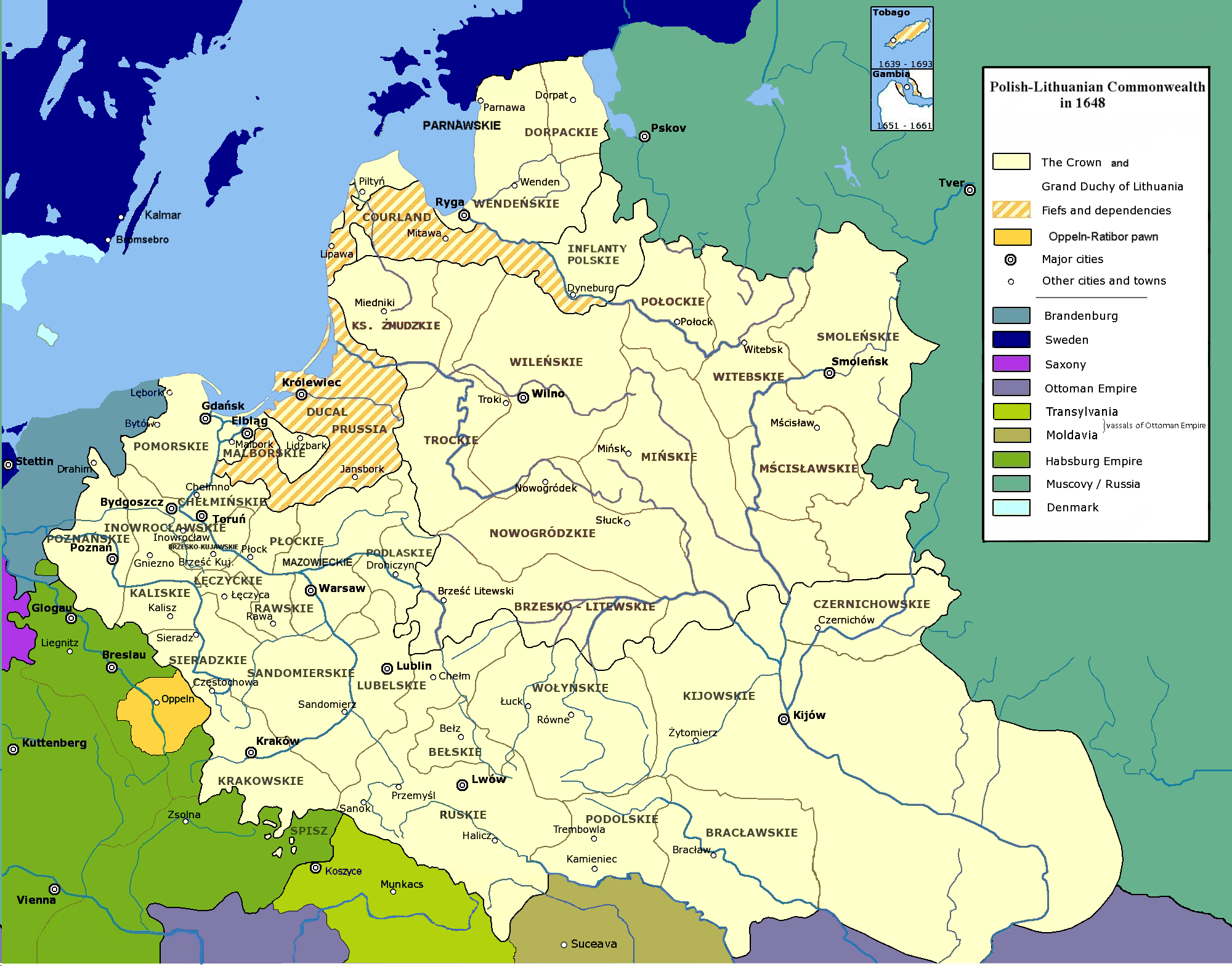
Polish–Lithuanian Commonwealth in 1648

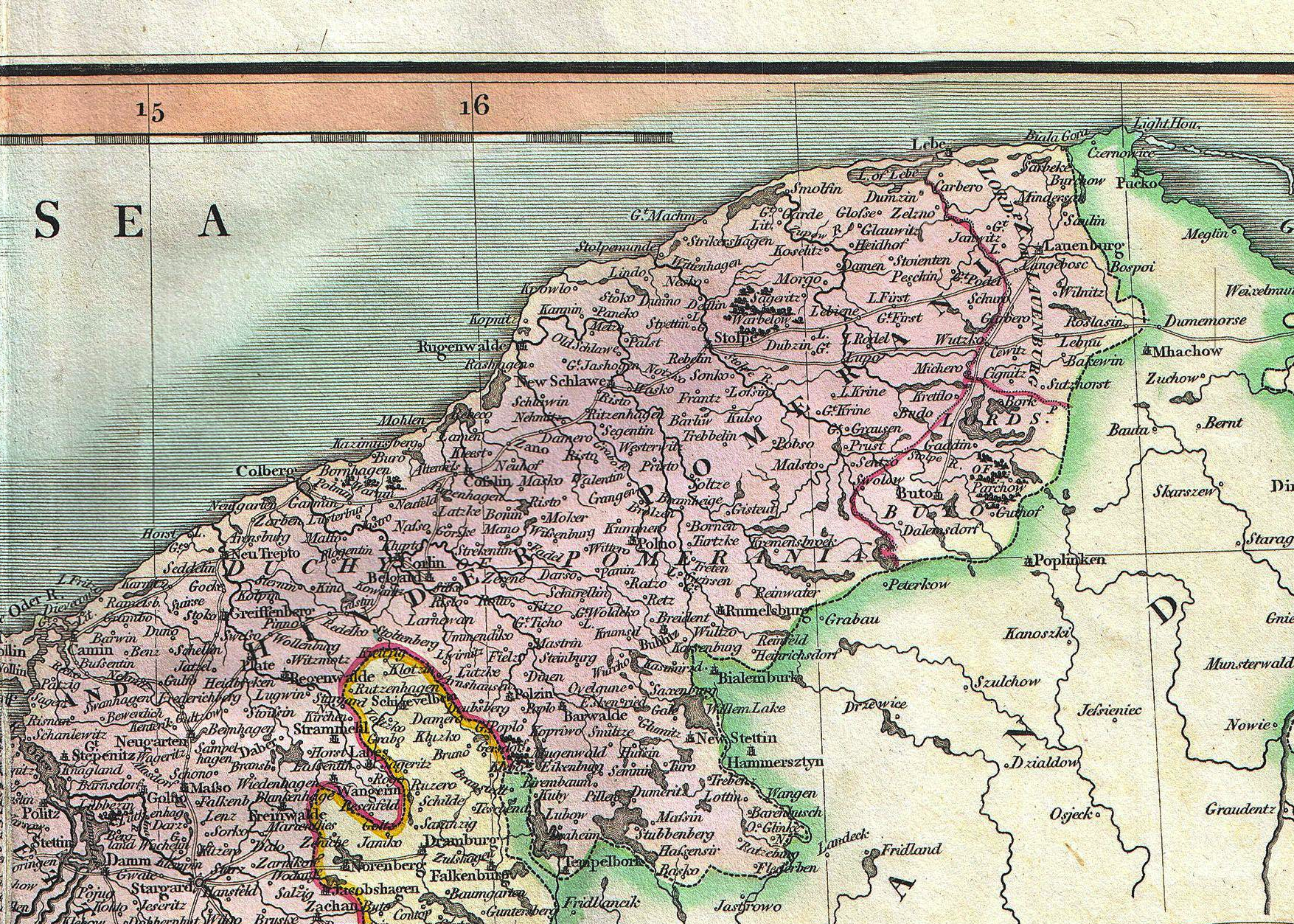
Lordships of Lauenburg and Bütow (identified as Buto) on a map of Farther Pomerania in the 18th century (on the r. h. s., western border marked in red)

After the childless death of the last Griffin duke, Bogislaw XIV in 1637, the land again became a terra (land, ziemia) of the Polish Crown and in 1641 became part of the Pomeranian Voivodeship of the Polish–Lithuanian Commonwealth. Whereas the Reformation had been enforced by the Pomeranian dukes, the Poles took action to regain the area for the Catholic Church.

=== Polish fief held by Brandenburg-Prussia ===
After the 1657 Treaty of Bydgoszcz (Bromberg) that amended the previous Treaty of Wehlau it was granted as a fief to the Hohenzollern dynasty of Brandenburg-Prussia in return for her help against Sweden in the Swedish-Polish War under the same favourable conditions the Griffins had enjoyed before. The Hohenzollern had also acquired the adjacent lands of Farther Pomerania upon the extinction of the line and since 1618 held the Duchy of Prussia in personal union.

=== Kingdom of Prussia ===
Lauenburg-Bütow was officially a Polish fiefdom until the First Partition of Poland in 1772. King Frederick II of Prussia had incorporated the territory the year before and the subsequent Treaty of Warsaw in 1773 made the former conditions obsolete. From 1772 on the area was still attached to the Pomerelian lands of part of West Prussia, but in 1777 Lauenburg and Bütow were finally integrated into the Prussian province of Farther Pomerania constituting along Draheim their only parts outside of Holy Roman Empire (thus Germany). After the Napoleonic Wars, Farther Pomerania was succeeded from 1815 onwards by the larger Province of Pomerania which became as a whole a part of the German Confederation. In 1846, the territory was partitioned into the two Landkreise Lauenburg and Bütow, both parts of the Regierungsbezirk of Köslin.

=== Free State of Prussia ===
While much of the Pomerelian lands annexed by Prussia were ceeded to the Second Polish Republic after World War I according to the 1919 Treaty of Versailles, Lauenburg and Bütow remained with the Prussian province of Pomerania until 1945.

=== Poland ===
Since the Potsdam Agreement after World War II, the region has been a part of Poland.

== Sources ==
Footnotes
