= Ostrowite, Gmina Chojnice =

Ostrowite
- Village
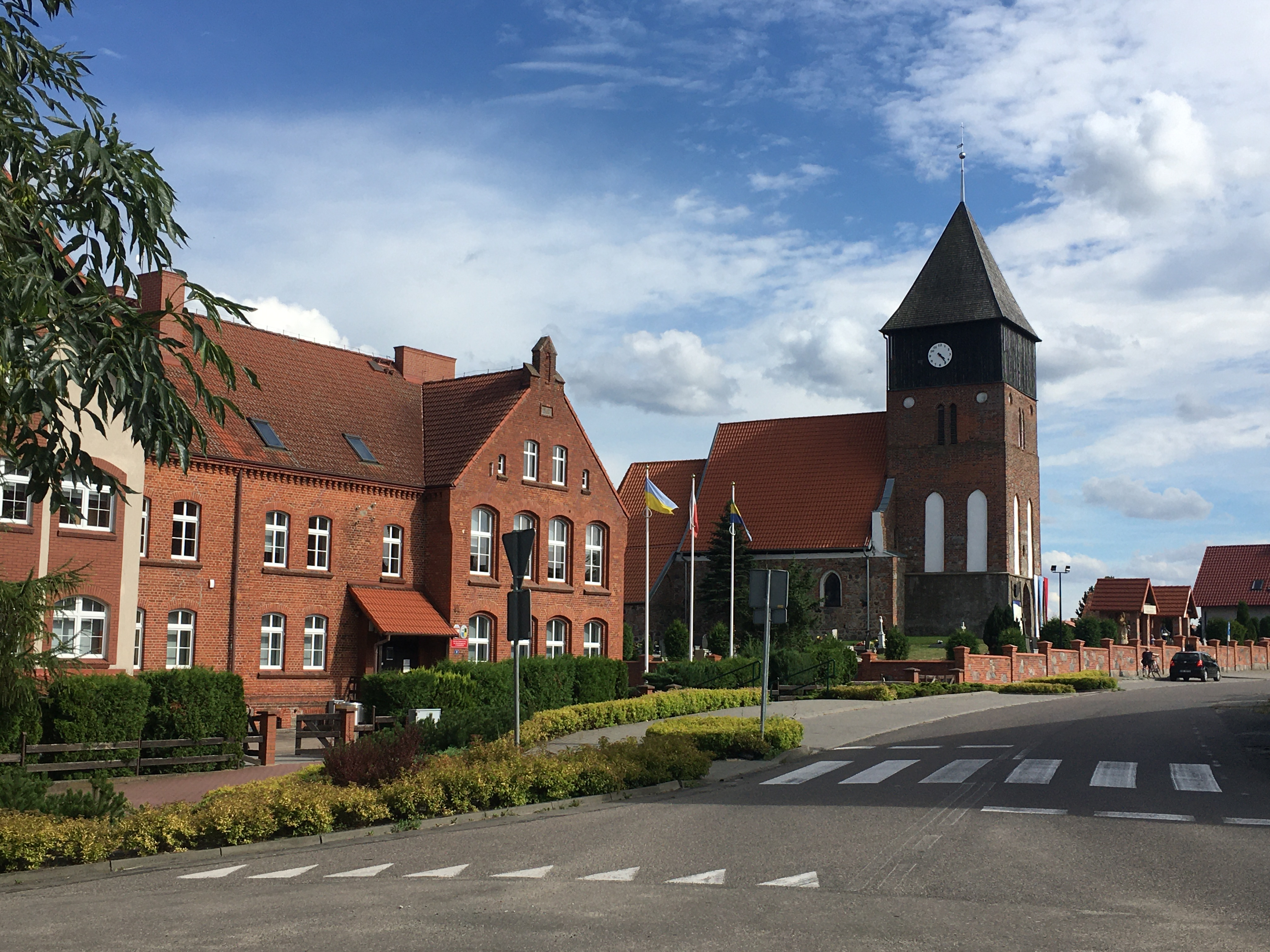
- Primary school and Saint James church in Ostrowite

- Location within Poland
- Coordinates: 53°38′0″N 17°40′4″E
- Country: Poland
- Voivodeship: Pomeranian
- County: Chojnice
- Gmina: Chojnice

Population
  - Total: 526
- Time zone: UTC+1 (CET)
  - Summer (DST): UTC+2 (CEST)
- Vehicle registration: GCH

Ostrowite [ɔstrɔˈvitɛ] is a village in the administrative district of Gmina Chojnice, within Chojnice County, Pomeranian Voivodeship, in northern Poland.

Ostrowite was a royal village of the Kingdom of Poland, administratively located in the Tuchola County in the Pomeranian Voivodeship.
