= Łąkie, Gmina Lipnica =

Łąkie
- Village
- Location within Poland
- Coordinates: 54°01′45″N 17°17′30″E
- Country: Poland
- Voivodeship: Pomeranian
- County: Bytów
- Gmina: Lipnica
- Population: 298

Łąkie [ˈwɔnkʲɛ] is a village in Gmina Lipnica, Bytów County, Pomeranian Voivodeship, in northern Poland.

From 1975 to 1998 the village was in Słupsk Voivodeship.

Łąkie is located in a rural area characterized by forests and lakes. The village is surrounded by several small settlements and belongs to Gmina Lipnica, whose administrative seat is the village of Lipnica, located about 17 km south of Bytów.
