= Gochy =

Cultural area in Kashubia, Poland

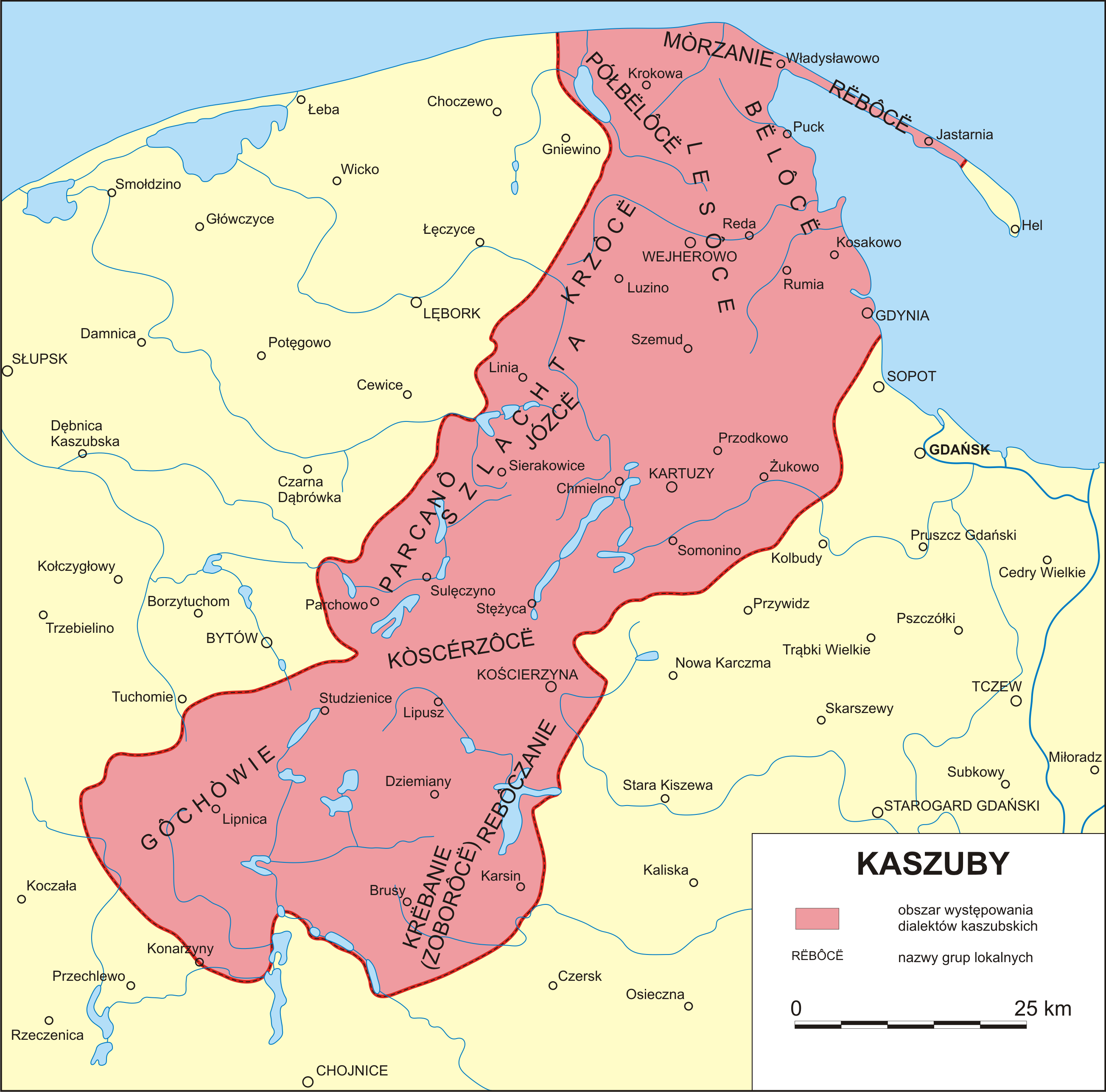
The map of Kashubian ethnic subgroups in the region of Kashubia, including the Gochy people.

Gochy (Note: Kashubian: Gòchë) is a cultural area in southwest Kashubia, located in Bytów County, Pomeranian Voivodeship, Poland. It borders Miastko to the west, Człuchów County to the south, Zabory to the east, and Bytowa Lake Region to the north. It is the homeland of the Gochan people, (Note: Polish: Gochowie, Gochy; Kashubian: Gòchòwie) a subgroup of Kashubian people. Historically, various families of Kashubian nobility originate from this area.
