= Gmina Lipnica =

Gmina Lipnica Lipnica Commune
- Gmina
- Flag Coat of arms
- Interactive map of Gmina Lipnica
- Coordinates (Lipnica): 53°59′46″N 17°24′24″E
- Country: Poland
- Voivodeship: Pomeranian
- County: Bytów
- Seat: Lipnica

Area
  - Total: 309.57 km^{2} (119.53 sq mi)

Population (2006)
  - Total: 4,796
  - Density: 15.49/km^{2} (40.13/sq mi)
- Website: http://www.lipnica.pl/

Gmina Lipnica (Kashubian: Gmina Lëpińce) is a rural gmina (administrative district) in Bytów County, Pomeranian Voivodeship, in northern Poland. Its seat is the village of Lipnica, which lies approximately 17 kilometres (11 mi) south of Bytów and 90 km (56 mi) south-west of the regional capital Gdańsk.

The gmina covers an area of 309.57 square kilometres (119.5 sq mi), and as of 2006 its total population is 4,796.

Mayor of the municipality is Andrzej Lemańczyk.

== Neighbouring gminas ==
Gmina Lipnica is bordered by the gminas of Brusy, Bytów, Chojnice, Koczała, Konarzyny, Miastko, Przechlewo, Studzienice and Tuchomie.
